= Shit Creek Review =

The Shit Creek Review is an online literary and art magazine (e-zine). Its content is mostly related to poetry. It draws on various online poetry forums, such as Eratosphere and The Gazebo.

== History ==
The Shit Creek Review was founded by Australian poet Paul Stevens in 2006. Stevens was joined by Nigel Holt and Angela France (who also edit the United Kingdom print magazine Iota) as its poetry editors, Don Zirilli as its art editor, and Patricia Wallace Jones as artist-in-residence. The journal is archived by the National Library of Australia.

The e-zine was originally started by Stevens as a joke; its name is an ironic allusion to the many literary magazines which use the title formula "X Creek (or River) Review," and a play on the Australian colloquialism "Up Shit Creek in a barbed wire canoe without a paddle" (to be in serious difficulties), famously said by Australian comedian Barry Humphries's ocker persona Barry McKenzie.

Stevens was editor-in-chief of the first ten issues until health problems caused him to step down in late 2009, at which time he was replaced by Rose Kelleher. Wallace Jones and Zirilli also left the editorial team at this time. Holt, Kelleher, and France co-edited issues 11 and 12, Holt subsequently leaving the team; Kelleher, France, and Stevens co-edited issue 13, and Kelleher and France were joined by Ann Drysdale and R. Nemo Hill as co-editors for issue 14. Kelleher relinquished the post of editor in July 2011, and Stevens resumed being editor-in-chief for issue 14 (December, 2011), rejoined by original editorial team members Zirilli and Jones, who, along with France and Drysdale, produced issue 14, themed "End of Days." It is uncertain whether there will be future issues of the journal.

== Style ==
The Shit Creek Review combines poetry with art that reflects the content or feel of the poem. The look and layout changes from issue to issue, so there is not much continuity of visual style; each new issue creates a new self-contained narrative appropriate to its theme. Much of the poetry is in the style of New Formalism, though there is also a strong representation of free verse.

The Shit Creek Review also occasionally publishes reviews and articles. Rose Kelleher wrote an essay called "Edgy vs. Nice" which was commented on by The Guardian's Tim Radford.

== Reception ==
Kelleher's book Bundle o' Tinder, published by Waywiser Press, includes several poems first published in The Shit Creek Review; the book was selected for the 2007 Anthony Hecht Poetry Prize by Richard Wilbur.

Poets who have published in The Shit Creek Review include Larry L. Fontenot, Rachel Bunting, Kirk Knesset, John Milbury-Steen, Janet Kenny, Tammy Ho Lai-Ming, Julie Carter, Eve Anthony Hanninen, Robert Clawson, and C.P. Stewart.

== The Chimaera ==
The Shit Creek Review spawned a sub-zine called II which was more text-based (less emphasis on the art). In October 2007, II separated from The Shit Creek Review and was renamed The Chimaera, edited by Paul Stevens and Peter Bloxsom of NetPublish. The Chimaera publishes verse, short stories, articles, essays, and interviews with prominent or rising poets, including Alison Brackenbury, John Whitworth, R. S. Gwynn, and Stephen Edgar.

== Notable Contributors ==
The Shit Creek Review has published poets from the U.K., United States, and Australia, including:

- Nicolette Bethel
- Alison Brackenbury
- Maryann Corbett
- Louie Crew
- Denise Duhamel
- Rhina Espaillat
- Andrew Frisardi
- M. A. Griffiths
- R. S. Gwynn
- Bill Knott
- J. Patrick Lewis
- Kei Miller
- Kevin Andrew Murphy
- Timothy Murphy
- Lee Passarella
- Craig Raine
- Charlotte Runcie
- A. E. Stallings
- Wendy Videlock
- Richard Wakefield
- John Whitworth
- Kirby Wright
- Peter Wyton

== Related E-zines ==
Paul Stevens also edited a "metaphysicalzine" called The Flea (after John Donne's poem), which publishes poetry loosely in the Metaphysical Poetry tradition. Peter Bloxsom publishes an online journal dedicated to sonnet form called 14 by 14.

Paul Stevens died in March 2013. The three online journal sites remain inactive since 2011, so they exist as archives. They are also accessible indefinitely in archives maintained by the National Library of Australia.

The online literary journal Angle publishes mainly poetry, annually in PDF format. Its founding editor, Philip Quinlan, was an admirer of Paul Stevens's journals.
