= Eratosphere =

Poetry workshop

Eratosphere is a free-to-join workshop for formal poetry. Additionally, it is a forum for free verse, for poetry and prose translation, fiction, art, literary criticism, and critical discussions on writing. It was founded in 1999 by Alexander Pepple as a workshop complement to Able Muse. Eratosphere moderators have included some of the best known formal poets, with the Poet Laureate of Wisconsin Marilyn Taylor, A. M. Juster, A. E. Stallings, and R. S. Gwynn among them.

The Distinguished Guest forum continues to host presentations and discussions with renowned writers and poets, such as former US Poet Laureate Richard Wilbur, the late Anthony Hecht, Timothy Steele, Charles Martin, and X. J. Kennedy. These discussions are permanently archived and accessible online. As such, it has been cited by academics and others as a reference (e.g., professor Susan Santovasi of Yale University on political poetry), whether to gauge poetic trends and beliefs or otherwise. Andrew Frisardi, the noted translator of Dante, acknowledges the help of members and moderators at Eratosphere’s Translation Board in the preparation of his translation of Dante’s Vita Nova

Poets who are members of Eratosphere and who have contributed content to the site at various times include Willis Barnstone, John Beaton, Geoffrey Brock, Terese Coe, Maryann Corbett, Dick Davis (translator), Gregory Dowling, Jehanne Dubrow, Rhina Espaillat, Mark Granier, M.A. Griffiths, R. S. Gwynn, Lee Gurga, A.M. Juster (the pen name of Michael J. Astrue), Julie Kane, Len Krisak, Paul Lake, David Mason, Mary Meriam, Susan McLean, Robert Mezey, Timothy Murphy, Jennifer Reeser, A. E. Stallings, Catherine Tufariello, Wendy Videlock, Richard Wakefield, John Whitworth, and Greg Williamson (poet).
