= Terese Coe =

American poet

Terese Coe is an American writer, translator, and dramatist. Her work has been published in over 100 journals in the United States, England, Scotland, Ireland, Canada, Australia, and India. She is the author of three collections of poetry, four published prose stories, and many translations from the French, German, and Spanish. She is a professor at the New York Institute of Technology.

== Background ==
Terese Coe (née Napolitano) was born in Manhattan and grew up in Brooklyn. She received a B.A. in English with a minor in comparative literature from the City College of New York and in 1967 an M.A. in dramatic literature from the University of Utah. Her M.A. thesis, “Paradigms of Ritualism,” examined ritualism in Euripides’ The Bacchae; Ulysses in Nighttown, a play based on the 15th episode of James Joyce's Ulysses; Garcia Lorca's Blood Wedding; Albee's Who’s Afraid of Virginia Woolf; Genet's The Maids; and Beckett's Happy Days.

Her poems, translations, and stories have appeared in US journals including 32 Poems, Able Muse, Alaska Quarterly Review, American Arts Quarterly, The Cincinnati Review, The Connecticut Review, The Evansville Review, High Times, The Hopkins Review, The Huffington Post, The Literary Review, Measure, Mezzo Cammin, New American Writing, The New York Times, Nimrod International, Ploughshares, Poetry, Smartish Pace, The Shakespeare Newsletter, Stone Canoe, Tar River Poetry, The Threepenny Review and Xavier Review; in the UK, in Agenda, Anon, Interlude, Interpreter’s House, Leviathan Quarterly, New Walk, New Writing Scotland, Poetry Review, the Times Literary Supplement, and Warwick Review; in Ireland, in Crannog, Cyphers, The Moth, and The Stinging Fly; and in Australia in Soapbox Media. The EBSCO research database lists numerous poems and translations by Coe.

Coe's poem "More" was among those chosen by Poetry Review Guest Editor George Szirtes to be heli-dropped across London as part of the 2012 London Olympics' Poetry Parnassus' Rain of Poems event.

Terese Coe's first collection of poems, The Everyday Uncommon, was published in 2005 by Wordtech. Her second collection, Shot Silk, was published in 2015 by Kelsay Books. Her third collection, Why You Can't Go Home Again, was published in 2018 by Kelsay Books. Her work appears in anthologies such as Anthology One (Alsop Review Press), Grace Notes: Poetry from the Pages of First Things, The Cento: A Collection of Collage Poems, Irresistible Sonnets,Jiggery Pokery Semicentennial (from Waywiser Press), Love Affairs at the Villa Nelle (from Kelsay Books), and Phoenix Rising from the Ashes (from Friesen Press, Canada).

Coe has worked as editor and writer for publications including The New York Free Press and Changes (NY, 1969); English teacher and director of poetry workshops in Kathmandu, Nepal; director of children's poetry workshops at the Sun Valley (ID) Center for the Arts; and as editorial consultant for numerous financial publications at investment banks in Manhattan. She worked for ten years as an adjunct professor of English writing and literature in New York.

== Awards and Scholarships ==
- Willis Barnstone Translation Prize, Finalist, 2009 and 2004 for her translations of Pierre de Ronsard's “Goodbye to the Green” (from the French) and Rainer Maria Rilke's “End of Autumn” (from the German), respectively. Evansville, Ohio.
- Giorno Poetry Systems: Two grants for poetry, 1999 and 2000; John Giorno, New York, NY.
- Helen Schaible Sonnet Award 2008: First Prize for poem, “Book of Changes.”
- The Nimrod/Hardman Prize 2005: Semifinalist for poem, “Letter to Anton Chekhov.” From Nimrod International Journal, Oklahoma.
- Nuyorican Poets Ball, 1992: First Prize in satire, Host Bob Holman.
- Orbis: “Lullaby” (translation from Rainer Maria Rilke) and “Saint John’s Bread” received the Orbis Readers’ Poll Honorable Mention for poems in Orbis 131, Spring 2005.
- The Orchards: nomination for a Pushcart Prize for the poem "Vanessa Stephen Bell" in 2019.
- Poet's Prize: Shot Silk was shortlisted for the 2017 Poet's Prize.
- Smartish Pace: nomination for a Pushcart Prize for her Ronsard translation, “Beset by War”; Dec. 1, 2006, MD.
- Triplopia: nominations for Pushcart Prize for “Minetta” in 2003; for “Spanish Dancer” in 2004, translated from the German of Rainer Maria Rilke.
- The West Chester Poetry Conference, West Chester University, PA: scholarships to attend in various years, including 2003 and 2005.
- Wordtech Communications: The Everyday Uncommon was a finalist in the Word Press Prize in 2004 and was published in 2005.
- The Lyric: "Home Free All" was a runner-up for the magazine's annual prize for best poem published there in 2005.

== Critical reception ==
Hayden Carruth wrote about The Everyday Uncommon: “It’s clear to me that she knows what she’s doing, she’s doing what she wants to do, and she does it well.” The book has also received critical praise from Rhina Espaillat, R. S. Gwynn, David Mason, and Deborah Warren, among others.

Terese Coe's work was discussed in depth by editors of the Cincinnati Review in 2012, and has been reviewed and discussed by Paul Hoover and other critics. Reviews of Shot Silk are by A.M. Juster, in Angle, Gregory Dowling, in Semicerchio, and D.A. Prince, in New Walk, reprinted at Eratosphere.

== Works ==
=== Sample poems, translations, and prose ===
- Agenda: Featured translations
- Christian Century: Rilke’s “The Angels”
- Cincinnati Review and Soapbox Media: “For I Will Consider”
- The Critical Flame: "Travels with My Daughter: The Himalayas"
- E-Verse Radio: translation of Heinrich Heine’s “Where?” (first appeared in Agenda, UK) and “Actors”
- Hopkins Review: "Daedal"
- Huffington Post: "In Spate"
- The Hypertexts: varying poems and translations
- New American Writing: Translations
- The New Verse News: "Reversals"
- Poetry Foundation: Translation of Pierre de Ronsard’s “Epitaph for François Rabelais”
- Potcake Poets: "Letter to Anton Chekov"
- Unsplendid: Translation of Pierre de Ronsard’s “Adieu Cruel Girl”
- Verse Daily: “In the Lee of the Disaster”

=== Collections ===
- Why You Can't Go Home Again, Kelsay Books (October, 2018), ISBN 978-1947465947
- Shot Silk, Kelsay Books (February, 2015), ISBN 978-0692376287
- The Everyday Uncommon, Wordtech (January, 2005), ISBN 1932339612

=== Essays ===
- Umbrella: Carmine Street Metrics: An Introduction, 2012.
