= The Flea (online poetry journal) =

The Flea was an online literary and art magazine (webzine or e-zine). Its content was mostly related to poetry, and included work belonging the differing styles of formalism and free verse by established authors and new writers. It focused partly on the authors and resources of a number of online poetry forums, such as Eratosphere and The Gazebo.

== History ==
The Flea was founded by Australian poet Paul Stevens in 2009 with the technical assistance of Peter Bloxsom, who also edits the online sonnet journal 14by14. It published many notable poets from the U.K., U.S. and Australia, including Les Murray, Robert Mezey, Alison Brackenbury, Stephen Edgar, Maryann Corbett, Rhina Espaillat, M. A. Griffiths, Rose Kelleher, Janet Kenny, Timothy Murphy, John Whitworth, Clive James, Alan Gould, Geoff Page, Peter Wyton and Ann Drysdale. The Flea is archived by The National Library of Australia's Pandora Archive, whose ‘Web sites are selected based on their cultural significance and research value in the long term’ (Pandora Archive). The final issue was dated 2011.

== Style ==
The Flea’s visual style and layout reflected that of an early 17th-century English broadsheet. It was named after John Donne's poem "The Flea", and published contemporary verse loosely in the metaphysical poetry tradition.

== Blog ==
Information about The Flea could be found on The Flea's blog, where serious and less serious discussions of literary and other matters took place, as well as links to poetry and art-related sites of interest.
