= Howard Nemerov Sonnet Award =

The Howard Nemerov Sonnet Award was established in 1994 by The Formalist. The award, honoring the poet Howard Nemerov (1920–1991), was an open competition for sonnets in English that drew about 3000 entries annually. The award was $1000, and from 1995–2004, the winning sonnet and the eleven finalists were published inFollowing the discontinuation of The Formalist in 2004, the winning sonnet and eleven finalist poems were published in the literary magazine Measure. The creation of this award is associated with the "New Formalism" movement.

In the announcement of the 2017 winner and finalists, the 2017 competition was described as the "24th & final" contest.

== List of winners ==
The winners, judges, and winning sonnets from 1994–2011 are posted on a webpage of The Formalist; the subsequent winners are also listed in the table below:

Past Winners
Year	Poet	Sonnet	Judge
2017	Carol Frith	Dying Firethorn	Dana Gioia
2016	Midge Goldberg	Tennis Practice Against the Garage Door	Rachel Hadas
2015	D. R. Goodman	All the Dropped Things	Gail White
2014	Marty Steyer	Caliban Is Not	R.S. Gwynn
2013	Gail White	Tourist in India	Dick Davis
2012	Gail White	Old Photographs	Rhina Espaillat
2011	Robert W. Crawford	Odds Are	A. M. Juster
2010	Catherine Chandler	Coming to Terms	A. E. Stallings
2009	Richard Wakefield	Petrarch	David Middleton
2008	Stephen Scaer	Sightseers	Timothy Steele
2007	A. M. Juster	No	Frederick Turner
2006	Robert W. Crawford	The Empty Chair	Andrew Hudgins
2005	Marion Shore	Petrarch on West 115th Street	Charles Martin
2004	A. E. Stallings	Hank Williams Blues	Rachel Hadas
2003	Rhina Espaillat	Discovery	Dana Gioia
2002	Marion Shore	Embarking	Wyatt Prunty
2001	Deborah Warren	Baggage	X. J. Kennedy
2000	A. M. Juster	Note from Echo	W. D. Snodgrass
1999	Bob McKenty	Chain Poem	Wendy Cope
1998	Rhina Espaillat	Contingencies	John Frederick Nims
1997	Madeleine Mysko	Incipient Fireworks	Donald Justice
1996	Timothy Murphy	The Track of the Storm	Anthony Hecht
1995	A. M. Juster	Moscow Zoo	Mona Van Duyn
1994	Sarah Birnbaum	Jo Painted	Richard Wilbur

== See also ==
- American poetry
- List of poetry awards
- List of literary awards
