= The Flea =

The Flea may refer to:

- The Flea (play), a 2023 play by James Fritz
- The Flea (poem) by the metaphysical poet John Donne
- The Flea (online poetry journal)
- The Flea (fairy tale), a fairy tale by Giambattista Basile
- The Flea (horse) (1846–1856), British thoroughbred racehorse
- The Flea (character), a character from the TV show ¡Mucha Lucha!
- The Flea 88.2, a radio station based in Devonport, Auckland, New Zealand
- The Flea Theater
- Bugaboo (The Flea), a 1983 video game by Paco Portalo and Paco Suarez
