= Subject to Change =

Subject to Change may refer to:

== Music ==
- Subject to Change (band), a 1991–1993 American rock band
- Subject to Change (Henry Threadgill album), 1985
- Subject to Change (Kelsea Ballerini album), 2022
- Subject to Change (Switched album), 2002
- Subject to Change (Vanessa-Mae album), 2001
- Subject to Change (EP), by the Faith, 1983
- Subject to Change, an album by Katelyn Tarver, 2021
- Subject to Change, an album by Xasthur, 2016

== Other uses ==
- Subject to Change, a 2010 stand-up DVD by Danny Bhoy
- Subject to Change, an upcoming Max original TV series
- Subject to Change, a 2004 poetry collection by Marilyn Taylor
- Subject to Change, a 2004 poetry collection by Matthew Thorburn

== See also ==
- Subject to Change Without Notice, a 2012 album by Jimmy Herring
