= Marilyn Taylor =

American poet (born 1939)

Marilyn L. Taylor (born October 2, 1939) is an American poet with eight published collections of poems. Taylor's poems have also appeared in a number of anthologies and journals, including The American Scholar, Able Muse, Measure, Smartish Pace, The Formalist, and Poetry magazine's 90th Anniversary Anthology. Her second full-length collection, Subject to Change (David Robert Books, 2004), was nominated for the Poets' Prize. She served as the city of Milwaukee's Poet Laureate in 2004 and 2005, and was appointed Poet Laureate of the state of Wisconsin for 2009 and 2010. She also served for five years as a contributing editor for The Writer Magazine. A retired adjunct assistant professor at the University of Wisconsin–Milwaukee, she taught poetry and poetics for the Department of English and later for the Honors College. She currently lives in Madison, Wisconsin, where she presents readings and facilitates workshops throughout Wisconsin and beyond.

== Books ==
- Outside the Frame: New and Selected Poems (Kelsay Books, 2021)
- Step on a Crack (Kelsay Books, 2016)
- Going Wrong (Parallel Press, 2009)
- Wisconsin Poets Laureate: Poems by Marilyn L. Taylor, Denise Sweet, Ellen Kort (Marsh River Editions, 2009)
- The Seven Very Liberal Arts (Aralia Press, 2006)
- Subject to Change (David Robert Books, 2004)
- Exit Only (Anamnesis Press, 2001)
- Marilyn L. Taylor: Greatest Hits, 2000 (Puddinghouse Press, 2001)
- Shadows Like These (Wm Caxton Ltd, 1994)
- Troika I: The Accident of Light (Thorntree Press, 1991)

== Anthologies (selected) ==
- Villanelles. 2012: Random House.
- Women Poets Anthology. Kelli Russell Agodon & Annette Spaulding-Convy, Eds. An eBook.
- Hot Sonnets: an Anthology. 2011: Entasis Press.
- Love and Lust: an Anthology. 2011: Parallel Press.
- An Endless Skyway: Poetry from the State Poets Laureate. 2011: Ice Cube Press.
- Filled With Breath: 30 Sonnets by 30 Poets. 2010: EXOT Books, New York.
- The Able Muse Anthology. 2010: Able Muse Press, San Jose, CA.
- Poetry.us.com. 2010: Today's Poetry for Today's World. http://poetry.us.com/.
- Fearsome Fascinations Anthology. 2009: Outrider Press, Chicago.
- Open Poetry Sonnet Anthology—Hand Luggage Only. 2008: Open Poetry, Leicestershire, UK
- Letters to the World: Poems from the Wom-Po Listserv. 2008: Red Hen Press, Pasadena, CA.
- A Walk in My Garden. 2007: Outrider Press, Chicago.
- Alhambra Press Poetry Calendar Anthology, 2006, 2007, 2008, 2009, 2010, 2011. Alhambra Press, Brussels, Belgium.
- Famous Poems and Poets. 2007: FamousPoemsandPoets.com.
- On Retirement: 75 Poems. 2007: U of Iowa Press.
- Discovering Genre: Poetry. 2006: Prestwick House. (Recipient of the 2007 Distinguished Achievement Award for Reading and Language Instruction from the Assn. of Educational Publishers)
- Thirty American Women Poets of the 20th Century: a Dual-Language Anthology. Stiftung Lyrik Kabinett, Munich, 2006.
- Rhymes for Adults. 2006: Virginia Reals Press.
- The Poem Tree: an Anthology of Formal Verse. 2004: www.poemtree.com.
- Emily Dickinson Awards Anthology. 2005: Universities West Press.
- Body Language: a Head-to-Toe Anthology. 2003: Black Moss Press.
- When I Was a Child. 2003: PoetWorks Press.
- The POETRY Anthology, 1912–2002. 2002: Ivan R. Dee, Publisher.
- Proposing on the Brooklyn Bridge: Poems About Marriage. 2003: Poetworks/Grayson Books.
- Smaller Than God: Words of Spiritual Longing. 2001: Black Moss Press.
- The Cancer Poetry Project: Poems by Cancer Patients and the People Who Love Them. 2001: Fairview Press.

== Journals (selected) ==
- Able Muse (Fall, 2008)

"Mixed Signals"

- The Alabama Literary Review (Spring, 2007)

"Studying the Menu" "Late November"

- American Life in Poetry, Ted Kooser, ed. (Feb. 28, 2011).

"Home Again, Home Again"

- Ars Poetica at www.logolalia.com (August 4–6, 2007)

"Cover Letter" "Trocha-spondaloopian Sonnet"

- The Atlanta Review (October 2007).

"The Seven Very Liberal Arts"

- BlackCatPoems.com (April, 2009).

"Rondeau: Old Woman With Cat" "Summer Sapphics" "Reading the Obituaries"

- The Cream City Review 27.2 (Spring 2003)

"After Twenty Years" "The Native"

- Dogwood (Spring 2003)

"Notes from the Good-Girl Chronicles, 1963"

- Ducts (Spring 2009)

"The Amazing Perseverance of the Sandhill Crane" "Reading the Dispatch"

- Echoes (Fall-Winter 2009)

"Stranger Things"

- Echoes (Fall-Winter 2011)

"Sonnet Against Form"

- Evansville Review (2006)

"Another Thing I Ought to Be Doing" "Rondeau: Old Woman with Cat"

- First Things (June/July 2009)

"Contingency"

- Free Verse (#84, 2006)

"Memo to a Late Baby" "Father Goose" "The Geniuses Among Us" "The Collector" "Cover Letter" "Three Lies: a Glose"

- Free Verse (#93, 2007)

"The Amazing Perseverance of the Sandhill Crane" "First Day in London"

- The Formalist 11.2 (2000) 106.

"Reading the Obituaries"

- GSU Review (Spring 2001), 7.

"On Learning, Late in Life, that Your Mother Was a Jew"

- Inkplots 1.3 (December 2010) "Piano Overture"

"To Lucy, Who Came First"

- Irish American Post (July 2001) Vol. 2, Issue 2

"Oh Lord, How I'd Love to Be Irish"

- The Ledge #25 (September 2001)

"Explication of a True Story" "Dispatch from the Cold War, 1951" "On Learning, Late in Life, that Your Mother Was a Jew" "Always Questions" "After the Countdown"

- MEASURE Vol III Issue 1 (2008)

"November in Verona, Wisconsin"

- MEASURE Vol III Issue 2 (2009)

"No Way"

- Mezzo Cammin, Vol. I, Issue 1 (2006)

"Nice Try" "Latter-day Letter to ESVM" "Again"

- Passager 32 (2000) 13 - 20

"The Aging Huntress Speaks to Her Reflection" "Agnostic's Villanelle" "I Miss You and I'm Drunk"

- Poemeleon (Summer, 2006)

"In Other News" "The Blue Water Buffalo" "Subject to Change"

- Poemeleon (Summer, 2007)

"To My Neighbor John Who Is Completely Happy" "Rondeau: Old Woman with Cat" "Reverie with Fries"

- Poemeleon, Humor Issue (Winter, 2008/2009)

"At the Cocktail Party" "Been Thinking"

- Poetry 180.5 (August 2002) 257–258

"The Geniuses Among Us" "Subject to Change"

- Primavera, Vol. 24 (2002)

"1949" "Chemotherapy"

- qarrtsiluni, (March 10, 2010)

"Sarcoma"

- Raintown Review (Spring 2006)

"Aunt Eudora's Harlequin Romance"

- Raintown Review (Spring 2007)

"Notice from the Sweet Chariot Funeral Parlor"

- Raintown Review (Spring 2010)

"Inventing the Love Poets"

- Sheeps Head Review (Fall 2009)

"The Geniuses Among Us"

- Shepherd Express/ExpressMilwaukee.com (June 25-July 1, 2009)

"Summer Saphhics"

- Smartish Pace (Spring/Summer 2000)

"Voice Mail for Wallace Stevens" "To a Cat Gone Blind in his Eighteenth Summer" "Ballade of the Open Mike"

- Smartish Pace Anniversary Issue 10 (April 2004)

"In Other News"

- Umbrella, 4, Winter 2007

"Aunt Eudora's Harlequin Romance"

- Umbrella, 7, Fall 2008

"Crickets: a Late Chorale"

- Valparaiso Poetry Review, Vol. II No. 2 (Spring/Summer 2001)

"Rondeau: Old Woman with Cat" "Poem for a 75th Birthday"

- Verse Daily (May 8, 2004)

"The Geniuses Among Us"

- Verse Wisconsin (Spring 2010)

"Any Constellation"

- Verse Wisconsin Online, Issue 102 (2010)

"Glass Under Glass"

- Wheelhouse (Spring 2007)

"To the Mother of a Dead Marine" "The Blue Water Buffalo"

- Wisconsin Academy Review 50.2 (Spring 2004)

"Sappho Under the Arches"

- Wisconsin People and Ideas, formerly Wisconsin Academy Review (Spring 2009)

"On Learning, Late in Life, that Your Mother was a Jew"

- Wisconsin Poets Calendar (2003)

"Surveying the Damage"

- Wisconsin Poets Calendar (2004)

"The Wilderness Has No Straight Lines"

- Wisconsin Poets Calendar (2005)

"Crickets: a late Chorale"

- Wisconsin Poets Calendar (2006)

"Valentine for a Bashful Boy"

- Wisconsin Poets Calendar (2008)

"Cover Letter"

- Wisconsin Poets Calendar (2009)

"Another Reason Never to Live North of 43 Degrees Latitude, Especially Near Lake Michigan"

- Wisconsin Poets Calendar (2010)

"To My Neighbor John, Who Is Completely Happy"

- Wisconsin Poets Calendar (2011)

"Star Wars"

- Wisconsin Poets Calendar (2012)

"St. Patrick's Day:a True Confession"

- YourDailyPoem.com (September 17, 2009)

"Subject to Change"

- YourDailyPoem.com (November 19, 2009)

"Home Again, Home Again"

- YourDailyPoem.com (April 17, 2010)

"Aunt Eudora's Harlequin Romance"

- ZinkZine: a Literary E-Zine of Fine Writing (Issue #3, Winter 2002)

"What They Don't Know" "The Showdown" "The Vow" "To My Neighbor John, Who is Completely Happy" "The Lovers at Eighty"

- ZinkZine: a Literary E-Zine of Fine Writing (Issue #9, Spring 2006)

"What Lips" (a collaboration)

== Awards and prizes (selected) ==
- Winner, Eratosphere Sonnet Bake-off Competition, 2010
- Associate Artist, Atlantic Center for the Arts, October, 2008
- Finalist, Open Poetry Sonnet Competition (U.K.), February, 2008
- International Publication Prize, The Atlanta Review International Poetry Competition, 2007
- Honorable Mentions (two), Dancing Galliard Sonnet Contest, 2007
- Finalist, Erskine J. Poetry Prize, 2006
- Finalist, Frost Foundation Poetry Awards, 2005
- Nomination, THE POETS PRIZE, 2005
- Two Pushcart Prize nominations, 2005
- Honorable Mention, Posner Poetry Book Award. Council for Wisconsin Writers, 2005
- Second Place, Emily Dickinson Award, Universities West Press, 2004
- POET LAUREATE appointment, CITY OF MILWAUKEE, 2004–2005
- First Prize, The Ledge 2000 Poetry Awards Competition
- First Prize, Dogwood Poetry Competition, 2003
- First Prize, GSU Review Poetry Contest, 2001
- First Prize, Anamnesis Press Poetry 2000 Chapbook Competition
- First Place Award, Passager Poetry Contest, 1999
