= A. E. Stallings =

American poet, translator, and essayist (born 1968)

- Born: July 2, 1968 (age 58); Decatur, Georgia, U.S.
- Education: University of Georgia (AB); Lady Margaret Hall, Oxford (MSt)
- Occupation: Poet
- Writing career
- Movement: New Formalism

Alicia Elsbeth Stallings (born July 2, 1968) is an American poet, translator, and essayist.

Stallings has published five books of original verse: Archaic Smile (1999), Hapax (2006), Olives (2012), Like (2018), and This Afterlife (2022). She has published verse translations of Lucretius's De Rerum Natura (The Nature of Things) and Hesiod's Works and Days, both with Penguin Classics, and a translation of Batrachomyomachia (The Battle of the Frogs and the Mice).

She has been awarded the Willis Barnstone Translation Prize, a Guggenheim Fellowship, a MacArthur Foundation Fellowship and has been a finalist for the Pulitzer Prize for Poetry and the National Book Critics Circle Award. Stallings is a Fellow of the American Academy of Arts & Sciences. On June 16, 2023, she was named the University of Oxford's 47th Professor of Poetry.

== Background ==
Stallings was born and raised in Decatur, Georgia and studied classics at the University of Georgia (A.B., 1990) and Lady Margaret Hall, Oxford (MSt in Latin Literature, 1991). She is an editor with the Atlanta Review. In 1999, Stallings moved to Athens, Greece. She is the Poetry Program Director of the Athens Centre and teaches regularly at the Sewanee Summer Writers' Workshop and the West Chester University Poetry Conference. She is married to the journalist John Psaropoulos.

== Writing ==
=== Works ===
==== Poetry ====
Stallings's poems have been published in The New Yorker, The Atlantic, The New York Review of Books, The Times Literary Supplement, The Sewanee Review, Beloit Poetry Journal, The Dark Horse, The New Criterion, Poetry, and Poetry Review. She also contributes essays and reviews to the American Scholar, The Hudson Review, the London Review of Books, Parnassus, Poetry Magazine, Poetry Review, the TLS, the Wall Street Journal, and the Yale Review. Stallings's work is widely anthologized, and has been included in the Best American Poetry in 1994, 2000, and 2015, and in the Best of the Best American Poetry (edited by Robert Pinsky). Stallings's poetry uses traditional form and has been associated with New Formalism.

Her first book-length collection of poetry, Archaic Smile, was published in 1999 by Northwestern University Press and in 2022 by Farrar, Straus, & Giroux; it won the 1999 Richard Wilbur Award. In 2006, she published her second book-length collection of poetry, Hapax, also with Northwestern; it was awarded the 2008 Poets' Prize, awarded annually to the best book of verse published by an American during the preceding year, and the American Academy of Arts and Letters' Benjamin H. Danks Award. Her third book-length collection, Olives, was published in 2012 with Northwestern; it was a finalist for that year's National Book Critics Circle Award. She published her fourth book-length collection, Like, in 2018, with Farrar, Straus, and Giroux. It was a finalist for that year's Pulitzer Prize in Poetry. In 2022, Stallings published a selection of published poems, This Afterlife, also with Farrar, Straus, and Giroux in the United States and Carcanet in the United Kingdom.

==== Translations and essays ====
Stallings is also a translator, and has translated works written in Ancient Greek, Modern Greek, and Latin. In 2007, she published a translation of Lucretius' De Rerum Natura into rhyming fourteeners. The translation was introduced by distinguished classicist Richard Jenkyns and was published by Penguin; reviewing the book in the TLS, classicist and critic Peter Stothard called it "one of the most extraordinary classical translations of recent times."

In 2017, Stallings published a verse translation of Hesiod's Works and Days, including an introductory essay and endnotes, also with Penguin. Classicist, critic, and poet Peter MacDonald characterized it as a "superb creation" and praised Stallings's "mastery of a characteristic voice" for Hesiod, while also noting the virtues of her "persuasively argued and brilliant Introduction".

Stallings has also translated the Battle between the Frogs and the Mice, a parody of Homer widely regarded to be a Hellenistic epyllion, into rhyming iambic pentameters; accompanied by illustrations from Grant Silverstein, it was published by Paul Dry in 2019. In her review of the translation, poet Ange Mlinko wrote: "It shouldn’t be so rare for a poet to be serious and to sparkle at the same time, but Stallings is one of the few."

=== Reception ===
In nominating Stallings for the position of Oxford Professor of Poetry in 2015, British literary critic and scholar Sir Christopher Ricks wrote: "The poems of A. E. Stallings are never less than the true voice of feeling, and always more ... she is able to realize in her poems the myriad minds of Europe." The MacArthur Fellowship committee praised her "mastery" of poetic form, declaring that: "[t]hrough her technical dexterity and graceful fusion of content and form, Stallings is revealing the timelessness of poetic expression and antiquity's relevance for today."

Poet Dana Gioia described Archaic Smile as "a debut of genuine distinction...Stallings displays extraordinary powers of invention and delight." Able Muse, a formalist online poetry journal, noted that, "For all of Stallings' formal virtuosity, few of her poems are strictly metrically regular. Indeed, one of the pleasant surprises of Archaic Smile is the number of superb poems in the gray zone between free and blank verse." Her work has been favorably compared to the poetry of Richard Wilbur and Edna St. Vincent Millay.

In a review of her collection Olives, Publishers Weekly stated that they were most impressed with those poems that were not responses to ancient mythology, noting, "When she unleashes her technical gifts upon poems in which she builds a new narrative instead of building upon an old one, Stallings achieves a restrained, stark poise that is threatening even by New Formalism standards."

Reviewing This Afterlife for the New York Times, poet and critic David Orr observed: "The main thing Stallings has going for her is that she’s good at writing poems. In particular, she’s good at writing the sort of poetry that evokes the word 'good,' rather than, for instance, 'brave' or 'disorienting.'" In its review of This Afterlife, The New Yorker wrote: "Stallings’s formal ingenuity lends a music to her philosophically and narratively compelling verse. She draws inspiration from daily domestic life and from the mythology and history of Greece...crafting clever yet profound meditations on love, motherhood, language, and time."

== Awards ==
Stallings has received extensive recognition for her original poetry. Her debut poetry collection, Archaic Smile, was awarded the 1999 Richard Wilbur Award and was a finalist for both the Yale Younger Poets Series and the Walt Whitman Award. Her poems have appeared in The Best American Poetry anthologies of 1994, 2000, 2015, 2016, and 2017. She has been awarded a Pushcart Prize, the Eunice Tietjens Prize, the 2004 Howard Nemerov Sonnet Award, and the James Dickey Prize.

Her second collection, Hapax (2006), was awarded the 2008 Poets' Prize. In 2012, her third collection, Olives, was a finalist for the National Book Critics Circle Award. Her fourth collection, Like, was a finalist for the 2019 Pulitzer Prize for Poetry. In April 2023, a volume of her selected works, This Afterlife, was shortlisted for the 2023 Runciman Award.

Stallings has also won acclaim for her translations. In 2010, she was awarded the Willis Barnstone Translation Prize. Her translation of Hesiod's Works and Days was shortlisted for the 2019 Runciman Award.

In 2011, she won a Guggenheim Fellowship, received a MacArthur Foundation Fellowship and was named a Fellow of United States Artists. Stallings is also a Fellow of the American Academy of Arts & Sciences.

In 2023, Stallings was elected as the 47th Oxford Professor of Poetry.

On February 4, 2025, Stallings was awarded a Lord Byron Philhellenism Medal by the Society for Hellenism and Philhellenism in recognition of her promotion of Hellenistic studies and Greek culture.

== Books ==
- Archaic Smile. University of Evansville Press. 1999. ISBN 0-930982-52-5.
- Hapax. TriQuarterly. 2006. ISBN 0-8101-5171-5.
- The Nature of Things. Penguin. 2007. ISBN 978-0-14-044796-5. Verse translation of Lucretius's De Rerum Natura.
- Delanty, Greg; Matto, Michael, eds. (2010). The Word Exchange: Anglo-Saxon Poems in Translation. W. W. Norton & Company. ISBN 978-0-393-07901-2.
- Olives. TriQuarterly. 2012. ISBN 978-0-81015-226-7.
- Works and Days. Penguin. 2018. ISBN 978-0141197524. Verse translation of Hesiod's Works and Days.
- Like. Farrar Straus Giroux. 2018. ISBN 9780374187323.
- 'The Battle Between the Frogs and the Mice': A Tiny Homeric Epic. Paul Dry. 2019. ISBN 978-1589881426. Verse translation of the Batrachomyomachia.
- This Afterlife: Selected Poems. Farrar Straus Giroux. 2022. ISBN 9780374600693. This Afterlife: Selected Poems. United Kingdom: Carcanet. ISBN 9781800172678.
- Frieze Frame: How Poets, Painters, and their Friends Framed the Debate Around Elgin and the Marbles of the Parthenon. Philadelphia: Paul Dry Books. 2025. ISBN 9781589882003.
