= M. A. Griffiths =

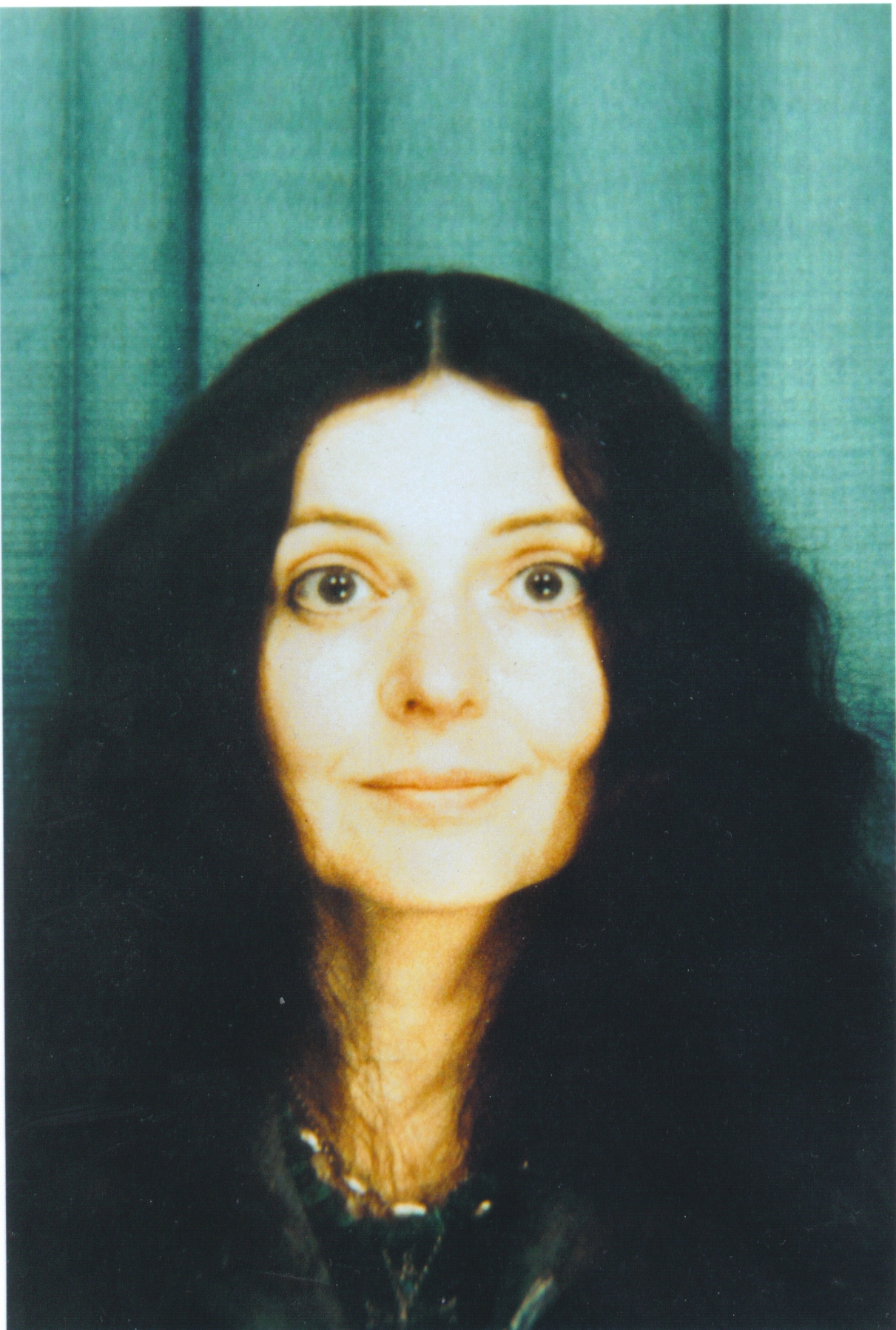
- Born: Margaret Ann Griffiths; 23 May 1947; Paddington, London, England
- Died: 13 July 2009 (aged 62); Poole, Dorset, England
- Writing career
- Notable work: Grasshopper: The Poetry of M. A. Griffiths
- Website: ramblingrose.com/grasshopper

M. A. Griffiths (1947–2009) was a British poet who developed an international following on the Internet.

== Life ==
Margaret Ann Griffiths, who was of English and Welsh parentage, was born and raised in London and studied archaeology at Cardiff University. She lived for some time in Bracknell and later moved to Poole, where she cared for her ailing parents until their deaths in 1993.

Griffiths, also known by the Internet pseudonyms "grasshopper" and "Maz", began posting her poetry online in 2001. Rather than seek publication through traditional channels, she was content to share her work with fellow poets on various Internet forums, including Sonnet Central, where she volunteered as a moderator. On the rare occasions she submitted work for publication, it was typically to online venues such as Snakeskin, miller's pond, and the Shit Creek Review. During the mid-2000s she worked from home, running a small Internet-based business, and edited the Poetry Worm, a monthly periodical distributed by email.

Griffiths suffered for years from a stomach ailment which eventually proved fatal. She died in July 2009.

== Poetry ==
Griffiths wrote on a wide array of subjects, in both free verse and traditional forms. Although she often posted at poetry forums popular with formalists, she eschewed such categories, writing, "The division between free and formal verse, as if one is better than the other, bewilders me." Largely ignoring contemporary trends and schools, she was more likely to make imaginative use of voice and setting than to experiment radically with language, and often wrote narrative poems and dramatic monologues in the voices of historical figures and fictional characters. Key themes included pets and animals in the wild; poets and scholars; illness and aging; war; spirituality; and women and sexuality. Her many influences included Andrew Marvell and Philip Larkin.

Although little known to academic critics, M. A. Griffiths acquired a significant international readership over the years, many of her admirers notable poets themselves. Canadian poet Colin Ward wrote in Rattle, "Ask who the best contemporary print poet is and you’re bound to get a wide variety of responses: Walcott, Heaney, Laux, Hill, Cohen, etc. Ask about the best online poet and you’ll get one answer: the late Margaret A. Griffiths." In a 2005 poll, Internet poetry readers declared her the poet they'd most want to see in an anthology. She was also known for her astute critique in online poetry workshops.

In 2008, her "Opening a Jar of Dead Sea Mud" won Eratosphere's annual Sonnet Bake-off, and was praised by Richard Wilbur. Later that year she was a Guest Poet on the Academy of American Poets website, where she was hailed as "one of the up-and-coming poets of our time". After her death, the American poet Timothy Murphy wrote, "It is a shame that Margaret Griffiths never took the TLS, PN Review, and Faber by storm. They would have been the better for it. But that wouldn't have been her style. Instead she frequented little 'zines and won our hearts pseudonymously. She was a masterful poet, and she is deeply missed."

== Posthumous publication ==
Almost immediately after her death was announced on Eratosphere, poets from all over the English-speaking world began collecting her work for posthumous publication. Roger Collett of Arrowhead Press (a not-for-profit in County Durham, England), who had requested a manuscript from Griffiths while she was alive, offered to publish a collection. David Anthony of Stoke Poges, Buckingham, England, took the lead in securing legal permission. Poets and editors formed a grassroots task force to help produce and promote the book, with members from London, Derbyshire, Scotland, Wales, Queensland, New South Wales, Massachusetts, New York, Minnesota, Missouri, Maryland, California and Texas.

A collection of her poems, Grasshopper: The Poetry of M. A. Griffiths was published in the U.K. by Arrowhead Press in January 2011 with an introduction by the British poet Alan Wickes. Within a month, orders for the book had come in from Australia, Canada, the US, the Philippines, and Israel. Another edition for the U.S. and Canada was published by Able Muse Press in April 2011.

== Books ==
- Grasshopper: The Poetry of M. A. Griffiths (Arrowhead Press, 2011) ISBN 978-1-904852-28-5
