= Jennifer Reeser =

Jennifer Reeser (born 1968 in Lake Charles, Louisiana) is an American New Formalist poet of Native American descent. She is the author of several poetry collections, including An Alabaster Flask (2003), Winterproof (2005), Sonnets from the Dark Lady and Other Poems (2012), The Lalaurie Horror (2013), Indigenous (2019), and Strong Feather (2022). Similarly to Richard Wilbur, Dana Gioia, and Rhina Espaillat, she has also served as a teacher and mentor at the annual West Chester University Poetry Conference. Poet X.J. Kennedy praised Reeser's first poetry collection, which he said, "ought to have been a candidate for a Pulitzer."

In addition to her translations of French poetry, Reeser has also translated the Russian poetry of Anna Akhmatova into English, with the approval of the poet's heirs. Reeser's poetry has been translated into Persian, Czech, and Hindi, and has been set to music by composer Lori Laitman.

== Personal life ==
Jennifer Reeser is married to Jason Phillip Reeser, a fiction writer. They have five children.
