= Iris N. Spencer Poetry Awards =

Annual awards given by the West Chester University Poetry Center

The Iris N. Spencer Poetry Awards are three awards administered by the West Chester University Poetry Center and are given annually during the West Chester University Poetry Conference "to recognize the important role of arts and letters in American life." The Iris N. Spencer Poetry Awards were named by Kean W. Spencer, who provided the initial endowment, after his mother.

== History ==
In 2005, the creation of the Iris N. Spencer Poetry Awards was announced at the WCU Poetry Conference. Kean W. Spencer provided the initial endowment of $250,000. Though not a poet himself, Spencer did win the prestigious Hopwood Award for poetry from the University of Michigan as a young man. The following year, the original two awards—the Donald Justice Poetry Prize and the Iris N. Spencer Undergraduate Poetry Award—were given for the first time.

Later on, the Myong Cha Son Haiku Award was added and presented for the first time in 2007.

== Donald Justice Poetry Prize ==
Books that have won the Donald Justice Poetry Prize display this logo on the cover

Given annually since 2006 to one poet for an unpublished book-length manuscript of poetry, the award includes $1500, publication, and a scholarship to the West Chester University Poetry Conference. The prize is named after poet Donald Justice.

== Undergraduate awards ==
These awards are open to all undergraduates who are enrolled in either a college or university. In 2012, both prizes went national. (Previously, the competition was only open to students in the Philadelphia metropolitan area of Pennsylvania.)

=== Iris N. Spencer Undergraduate Poetry Award ===
Given annually since 2006 for an original poem composed in the traditional modes of meter, rhyme and form to one winner and one runner-up, the Iris N. Spencer Undergraduate Poetry Award includes $1500 and $500 respectively as well as an opportunity for publication for both.

The first place award was increased to $1500 from $1000 in 2012.

The following are the winners of the Iris N. Spencer Undergraduate Award:

- 2006 — William Welsh
- 2007 — Luke Stromberg
- 2008 — Robert Whitehead
- 2009 — Molly O'Neill
- 2010 — Emily Yoon
- 2011 — Jule Coppa
- 2012 — Miranda Stinson
- 2013 — Stephen Rodriguez
- 2014 —
- 2015 —
- 2016 — Rachel Ann Girty
- 2017 —
- 2018 — Morgan Ome
- 2019 — Alecc C. Costanzi
- 2020 — Julián David Bañuelos
- 2021 — Alejandro Lucero
- 2022 — Elise Forslund
- 2023 — Emma Bailey
- 2024 — Madelyn Dietz
- 2025 — Brianna Virabouth

The runners-up were:

- 2006 —
- 2007 —
- 2008 —
- 2009 — Frances Wright
- 2010 — Julie Price
- 2011 —
- 2012 — Erin Jones
- 2013 — Laura Grothaus
- 2014 —
- 2015 —
- 2016 —
- 2017 —
- 2018 — Emily Stepp
- 2019 — Eliza Browning
- 2020 — Latif Askia Ba
- 2021 — Carmen Perez
- 2022 — Tesia Wieprecht
- 2023 — Victoria Dell’Elmo
- 2024 — Natalie Fraser
- 2025 — Charlotte Decker

=== Myong Cha Son Haiku Award ===
Given annually since 2007 for an original unpublished haiku, the Myong Cha Son Haiku Award includes $1500 prize for one winner and a $500 prize for a runner-up and an opportunity for publication in a national literary journal for both. This award was created by Kyle R. Spencer (in contrast to the two older Iris N. Spencer Poetry Awards by Kean W. Spencer), and is named after his mother-in-law.

The following are the winners of the Myong Cha Son Haiku Award:

- 2007 — Luke Bauerlein
- 2008 — Giaco Furino
- 2009 — David J. Doyle
- 2010 — Stephen Krewson
- 2011 — Talia Lev
- 2012 — Billy Lockhart
- 2013 — Kasey Erin Phifer
- 2014 — Yoon Hyuk Park

The runners-up were:

- 2007 —
- 2008 —
- 2009 —
- 2010 —
- 2011 —
- 2012 — Kasey Erin Phifer
- 2013 — Therese O'Shaughnessy
- 2014 —
