= Maryann Corbett =

American poet

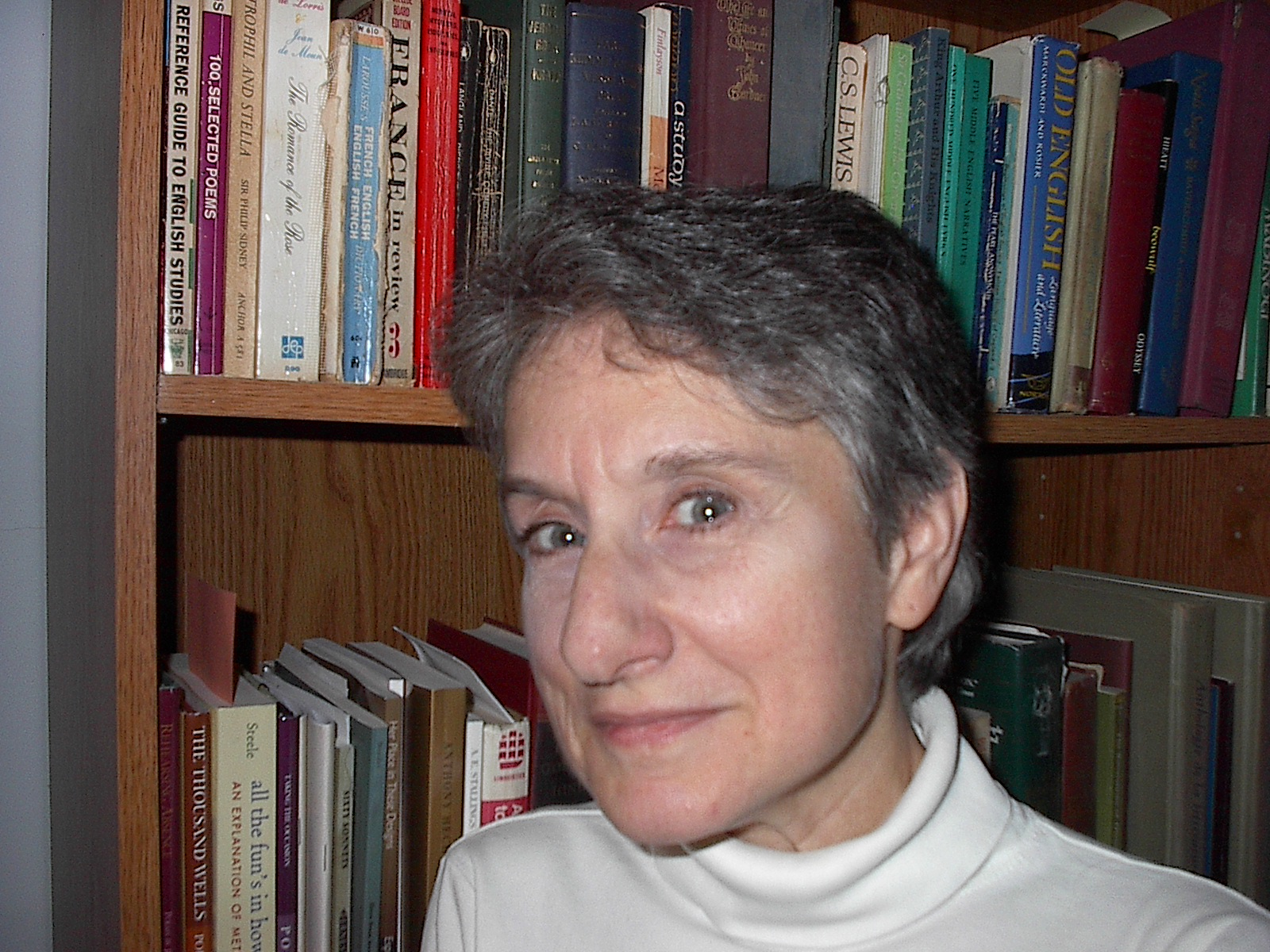
- Born: Maryann Zillotti; Washington, D.C., U.S.
- Education: College of William & Mary
- Occupations: Poet; medievalist; linguist
- Writing career
- Notable awards: Willis Barnstone Translation Prize (2009); Richard Wilbur Award (2014)

Maryann Corbett (née Zillotti, Washington, D.C.) is an American poet, medievalist, and linguist.

She grew up in northern Virginia. She did her undergraduate work at the College of William & Mary in Williamsburg, Virginia, and graduated with a doctorate in English from the University of Minnesota.

Her work has appeared in Southwest Review, Barrow Street, Rattle, River Styx, Atlanta Review, The Evansville Review, Measure, Literary Imagination, The Dark Horse, Italian Americana, Mezzo Cammin, Linebreak, Subtropics, Verse Daily, American Life in Poetry, The Poetry Foundation, The Writer's Almanac, and many other venues in print and online, as well as an assortment of anthologies, including The Best American Poetry 2018. She has been a several-time Pushcart and Best of the Net nominee; a finalist for the 2009 Morton Marr Prize, the 2010 Best of the Net anthology, and the 2011 and 2016 Able Muse Book Prize; and a winner of the Lyric Memorial Award, the Willis Barnstone Translation Prize, and the Richard Wilbur Award. Her third book, Mid Evil, is the Wilbur Award winner and has been published by the University of Evansville Press.

She has worked as a writing teacher and master indexer for the Minnesota Legislature, where she has served in the state Office of the Revisor of Statutes for 35 years. She lives in Saint Paul, Minnesota.

== Awards ==
Year	Sponsor / Prize	Result
2016	Able Muse Book Prize	Finalist
2014	Richard Wilbur Award	Won
2011	Able Muse Book Prize	Finalist
2011	Best of the Net	Finalist
2009	Morton Marr Prize	Finalist
2009	Willis Barnstone Translation Prize	Won
2008	Lyric Memorial Award	Won

== Works ==
=== Sample poems ===
- "A Song for the Putting Away of Childish Things", J Journal, Fall 2024
- "Heliopause", New Statesman, July 12, 2023
- "Concourse", 32 Poems, Fall/Winter 2016
- "Prayer Concerning the New, More 'Accurate' Translation of Certain Prayers", Rattle, April 26, 2017; The Best American Poetry 2018
- "Apophatic", Rattle, January 16, 2015
- "Before"; "Variorum", Umbrella Journal, 2008
- "Hand", Strong Verse, 10/30/2008
- "Sacred Harp Convention", Poetry Porch
- "A Meditation on Dactylic Hexameter", The Barefoot Muse

=== Collections ===
- The O in the Air, Franciscan University Press (July 7, 2023) ISBN 9781736656167
- In Code, Able Muse Press (November 27, 2020), ISBN 9781773490533
- Street View, Able Muse Press (September 11, 2017), ISBN 978-1927409909
- Mid Evil, University of Evansville Press; (January, 2015), ISBN 978-0930982744
- Credo for the Checkout Line in Winter, Able Muse Press; (September, 2013), ISBN 978-1-927409-14-5
- Breath Control, David Robert Books; (February 1, 2012), ISBN 9781936370627
- Dissonance, Scienter Press; (December 1, 2009), ISBN 978-0-9776960-8-6
- Gardening in a Time of War (Pudding House, 2007). ISBN 978-1-58998-611-4

=== Essays ===
- "The Monsters and the Translators: Grappling with Beowulf in the Third Millenium." Literary Matters, Issue 14.2
- "Capital Improvements: The Initial Caps Wars." Literary Matters, Issue 16.1
- "Hildegard of Bingen: Singer of the Secrets of God." The Mezzo Cammin Women Poets Timeline.

=== Reviews ===
- "Putting Things Back Together: On Alexis Sears's Out of Order" Los Angeles Review of Books, March 31, 2022
- "On Joyful Perseverance in Three Midcareer Poets: New Books by Brian Brodeur, Ernest Hilbert, and Amy Glynn" The Hopkins Review, September 25, 2023
