= Gregory Dowling =

Gregory Dowling is an author, translator, literary critic and Professor of Anglo-American Literature at the Università Ca’ Foscari in Venice.

== Early life ==
Gregory Dowling was born and raised in Bristol, England. He read English Literature at Christ Church, Oxford, graduating with a 1st Class Honours in 1978. In 1979 he travelled to Italy to teach English; he first arrived in Naples, where he lived in a small pensione for three months. He then moved to Siena, and in 1979 to Verona and found an English teaching job at the Oxford School, where he met his future wife Patrizia who was studying English at the time. While living in Verona, he visited Venice very often until he decided to move there, and began teaching English at the Oxford School-based there.

== Work ==
=== Academic career ===
In 1983 he began as Lettore (equivalent to Reader) in English Language at the Istituto Universitario di Lingue Moderne of Feltre before becoming lettore at the Università Ca’ Foscari of Venice in 1985. He kept this job until 1999 when he was appointed Ricercatore (equivalent to assistant professor) of Anglo-American Language and Literature at the Università Ca’ Foscari, and became associate professor in 2006. Throughout his academic career Dowling's main areas of interest have been Second World War poetry, Contemporary American Poetry, English Novelists of the 19th century, the Romantic Poets, English and American writers and Italy, and Venice in the 18th century. He has published several works of criticism, anthologies, and translations, as well as many articles, essays and reviews on such subjects. Specifically, his book-length publications include David Mason: A Critical Introduction (a monography on the author of the verse-novel Ludlow); In Venice and in the Veneto with Lord Byron (a guidebook which traces Byron's three-year experience in Venice); Someone’s Road Home: Questions of Home and Exile in American Narrative Poetry, which focuses on the works of H.W. Longfellow, Herman Melville, Wallace Stevens, Robert Frost, Anthony Hecht and Vikram Seth; and A Study of the English Verb. He has also co-edited a number of poetry anthologies, including Gondola signore gondola. Venice in 20th Century American Poetry, which explores American poetry on Venice, co-edited with Rosella Mamoli Zorzi, and Giovane Poesia Inglese, an anthology of contemporary British poetry, with Alessandro Scarsella.

=== Novels ===
Dowling is the author of six novels, often described as a blend of the thriller and detective genres. His first four novels came out between the mid-1980s and early 1990s: Double Take, an international intrigue type thriller; See Naples and Kill, which draws on Dowling's experience living in Naples; Every Picture Tells a Story, a crime story set in Venice; and A Nice Steady Job, set in and around Verona, which came out in 1994. He then took a break from writing fiction to focus on his academic career, and returned in 2015 with the novel Ascension, a historical thriller set in 18th-century Venice, the first in the Alvise Marangon Mysteries series, centred on the protagonist Alvise Marangon, a half-Venetian, half-English tour guide who turns spy to help the Venetian intelligence services thwart imminent threats to the city; Ascension was named “Historical Novel of the Month" in The Times, which described it as blending “a laconic, amused style informed by American detective literature with a profound knowledge of Venetian geography and history. Stylish, clever and gripping.” The Four Horsemen, the sequel in the series, came out in the summer of 2017. Dowling is currently writing a third, although no publication date has been set yet.

=== Translations and editing ===
Dowling has translated various books from Italian into English, most notably the novel Veritas by Italian novelists Monaldi & Sorti, Enigma by the Sea (Enigma in luogo di mare) and The D Case (La verità sul caso D) by Carlo Fruttero and Franco Lucentini, and Francesco Da Mosto's travel books Francesco’s Italy and Francesco’s Venice.

He has also worked as non-fiction editor for the poetry magazine Able Muse and is currently responsible for the British section of the Italian poetry magazine Semicerchio.

== Personal life ==
Dowling lives in Venice with his wife Patrizia. They have two sons, Christopher and Alessandro.

== Bibliography ==
=== Novels ===
- The Four Horsemen, Edinburgh: Polygon 2017; St Martin's Press 201
- Ascension, Edinburgh: Polygon 2015; St Martin's Press 2016
- A Nice Steady Job, New York: St. Martin's Press 1994
- Every Picture Tells a Story, New York: St. Martin's Press 1991
- See Naples and Kill, New York: St. Martin's Press 1988; [under the title Neapolitan Reel] London: Severn House 1988
- Double Take, London: Severn House 1985; St Martin's Press 1985

=== Criticism ===
==== Books ====
- David Mason: A Critical Introduction, Story Line Press, West Chester, USA 2013
- In Venice and in the Veneto with Lord Byron, Venice: Supernova 2008
- Someone's Road Home: Questions of Home and Exile in American Narrative Poetry, Udine: Campanotto Editore 2003
- A Study of the English Verb, Venezia: Supernova 1994

==== Essays, reviews and articles ====
- “‘Introduzione a Impressioni Irlandesi di G.K. Chesterton”, in G.K. Chesterton, Impressioni Irlandesi, Milano, Medusa, pp. 5–21.
- “‘Cold Music’: Browning's Reconsideration of the Venetian Settecento in ‘A Toccata of Galuppi's’”, in Francesca Bisutti, Pia Masiero (eds.), A Rosella: saggi in onore di Rosella Mamoli Zorzi, Venezia, Supernova, pp. 115-131.
- “‘The Fascination of What's Difficult': Narrative Poetry in Strict Forms”, in Stephen Schneider (ed)., The Contemporary Narrative Poem: Critical Crosscurrents, Iowa City, University of Iowa Press, pp. 27-55.
- “Anthony Hecht; James Merrill; Edwin Arlington Robinson; W.D. Snodgrass; James Wright” in Luca Briasco, Mattia Carratello (eds.), La letteratura Americana dal 1900 a oggi, Torino, Einaudi, vol. 1 (Encyclopedia entries)
- “Venezia osservata, Venezia salvata: lo sguardo duplice di Mary McCarthy” in Adriana Arban, Paola Mildonian (eds.), Personaggi stravaganti a Venezia tra '800 e '900. Le storie del FAI/2, in Le storie del FAI. Venezia: Antiga Edizioni, vol. 2, 2011, pp. 105–127.
- “‘Immortal Passion’: sull'eredità di Ruskin” in Raoul Bruni (ed.), Venezia e le altre. Padova: Ed. ilnotes magico, 2009, pp. 73–88.
- “‘Raking it up’: John Drury's ‘Burning the Aspern Papers’” in Melanie H. Ross, Greg W. Zacharias (eds.), Tracing Henry James. Newcastle: Cambridge Scholars Press, 2008, pp. 237-251.
- “Utopies Ecologiques” in V. Fortunati, R. Trousson, P. Spinozzi (eds.), Histoire transnationale de l'utopie littéraire e de l'utopisme. Paris: Honoré Champion, 2008, pp. 1073–1078.
- "‘Beyond Confusion’: Robert Frost's American Dream” in F. Bisutti (ed.), Il sogno delle Americhe. Padova: Studio Editoriale Gordini, 2007, pp. 213–226.
- Andy Croft, N.S. Thompson (Eds.), A Modern Don Juan, (review) in Semicerchio, volume LII, Spring 2015
- “Tilting the World: Seamus Heaney's Poem ‘Miracle’”, in Semicerchio, Vol. LI, pp. 6-9 (ISSN 1123-4075).
- “John Whitworth: Girlie Gangs”, in Semicerchio, Vol. L, pp. 77–79 (ISSN 1123-4075).
- “G. K. Chesterton's Father Brown Stories: the Debt to Sherlock Holmes”, in The Chesterton Review, vol. XXXIX, Nos. 3 & 4, pp. 81–91 (ISSN 0317-0500)
- “‘A Window Fiery-Mild’: The Role of Venice in ‘The Book of Ephraim’ by James Merrill”, in Contemporary Poetry Review, vol. November 2013
- “‘Play for Mortal Stakes’: Work and Play in the Poetry of Robert Frost”, in Semicerchio, vol. XLVIII-XLIX, pp. 216–220.
- “‘Don't Let Me Tell Me Who I Think You Are.’ Quincy Lehr: A Career Review”, in ANGLE, Vol. 2, pp. 47–58.
- “Reading William Butler Yeats's ‘Coole Park, 1929’”, in Able Muse, vol. 14, pp. 7-13, 2012.
- “The Light of Loss: Thomas Hardy's ‘The Last Signal’”, in Contemporary Poetry Review, vol. October 2012.
- “‘Queer Light’: Hecht, Bishop and Bosch”, in Per Contra, vol. 23 (web-publication), 2012.
- “Aidan Wasley, The Age of Auden: Postwar Poetry and the American Scene” (review) in Semicerchio, volume XLV, Spring 2011
- “‘A Free Mind within a Disciplined Form": L'impegno del disimpegno di Tom Stoppard”, in Annali di Ca' Foscari, vol. XLVIII, 2010, pp. 61–77.
- “‘A Way of Arriving’ – Paying Tribute to Rachel Wetzsteon” in Able Muse, Summer 2010.
- “Grace-Notes: the Poetry of Andrew Waterman” in Able Muse, Summer 2010.
- “Masters of the Airy Manner: Auden and Byron” in Contemporary Poetry Review, June 2010.
- “CPR Classic Readings: Philip Larkin’s ‘Here’” in Contemporary Poetry Review, June 2010.
- “Geoffrey Hill, Per chi non è caduto: Poesie scelte 1959-2006” in Semicerchio, XL, 2009, pp. 79–82.
- “New Formalism: Dangerous Nostalgia or Angelic Rebellion?” in Letteratura e Letterature, volume 3, 2009, pp. 133–152.
- “Simon Armitage: Out of the Blue” (review) in Semicerchio, volume XXXIX, 2009, pp. 77–79.
- “Tony Harrison: Collected Poems and Collected Film Poetry” (review) in Semicerchio, volume XXXIX, 2009, pp. 79–84.
- “‘The Whole World’s Wild’: Richard Wilbur's War Poetry” in Camboni, M; De Angelis, V.M.; Fiorentino, D.; Petrovich Njegosh, T., USA: Identities, Cultures and Politics in National, Transnational and Global Perspectives, Macerata, EUM edizioni università di Macerata, 2009, pp. 305–315.
- “‘Equivocations in the Plainest Sign’: Greg Williamson's A Most Marvelous Piece of Luck” (review) in Able Muse, 2008.
- “The Dinky Toys of Retrospect’: the Poetry of John Whitworth” in The Chimaera, vol. 4, Sept. 2008. (www.the-chimaera.com).
- “Storia della letteratura inglese. Dal 1870 al 1921 by Franco Marucci” (review) in European English Messenger; p. 77-81, 2007.
- ‘‘‘Trust her for Teaching!’: The Role of Venice in Arthur Hugh Clough's Dipsychus” in Annali di Ca' Foscari, volume XLV, 1, 2006, pp. 39-50.
- “Eudora Welty: Mississippi from a Female Perspective” in Eudora Welty Newsletter, volume XXX No. 2, 2006, pp. 22–25.
- “Rhina P. Espaillat: Playing at Stillness” (review) in Semicerchio, volume XXXIV, 2006, pp. 95.
- “Living outside the Blast: Andrew Hudgins's After the Lost War” in RSA Journal, volume 14, 2005, pp. 139–157.

=== Edited ===
- Gondola signore gondola. Venice in 20th Century American Poetry, Venice: Supernova 2007
- Giovane poesia inglese, Treviso: Edizioni del Leone 1996

=== Translations ===
- Rita Monaldi and Francesco Sorti, Veritas, Edinburgh: Polygon 2013
- Francesco Da Mosto, Francesco's Italy, London: BBC Books 2006
- Francesco Da Mosto, Francesco's Venice, London: BBC Books 2004 [translated with David Graham]
- Massimo Gemin and Filippo Pedrocco, Giambattista Tiepolo, Venezia: Arsenale Editrice 1995
- Gian Franco Svideroschi, Letter to a Jewish Friend (Lettera ad un amico ebreo), London: Hodder and Stoughton 1994
- Carlo Fruttero and Franco Lucentini, Enigma by the Sea (Enigma in luogo di mare), London: Chatto & Windus 1994
- Carlo Fruttero and Franco Lucentini, The D Case (La verità sul caso D), New York: Harcourt Brace Jovanovich 1992; London: Chatto & Windus 1993
- Cristina Comencini, The Missing Pages (Le pagine strappate), London: Chatto & Windus 1993

=== Guidebooks ===
- Contributions to the Time Out Guide to Venice, Verona, Treviso and the Veneto, Lee Marshall and Anne Hansley (eds.), Harmondsworth: Penguin 1999
- Contributions to the Time Out Guide to Milan and Lombardy.
