= Wendy Videlock =

American poet

- Born: 1961 (age 64–65); Dayton, Ohio
- Education: University of Arizona
- Writing career
- Movement: New Formalism

Wendy Videlock (born 1961) is a poet and artist. She is the author of the chapbook What’s That Supposed to Mean (2010) and collections Wise to the West (2022), Slingshots and Love Plums (2015), The Dark Gnu and Other Poems (2013), and Nevertheless (2011). She also published a collection of essays, The Poetic Imaginarium: A Worthy Difficulty, in 2022.

== Personal life ==
Since 1997, Videlock and her husband have been living on the western slope of the Colorado Rockies, where they raised their two children.

== Career ==
Videlock is a regular contributor to Poetry, known for engaging with themes of myth, fairy tale, and the natural world and for “deft command of meter.” Under the editorship of Christian Wiman, Poetry Magazine has published dozens of her poems. Her work has appeared twice in Best American Poetry, and she is a regular contributor to The Hudson Review, Hopkins Review, and Rattle Magazine. She has also appeared in Oprah Quarterly and the New York Times.

Videlock also occasionally teaches poetry workshops and has worked with the Western Colorado Writers' Forum to develop workshops that integrate different art practices into one setting.

She published her first chapbook, What’s That Supposed to Mean in 2010, and four poetry collections: Wise to the West (2022), Slingshots and Love Plums (2015), The Dark Gnu and Other Poems (2013), and Nevertheless (2011).

=== Art ===
Videlock is also a visual artist, specializing in alcohol ink paintings, whose works appear in galleries throughout the Western Slope. She has an art Instagram under the username wendyvidelock.inklings and a website.

== Awards and honors ==
Videlock has received numerous awards.

- Western Slope Poet Laureate, Telluride Institute, 2023 - 2025
- "Ode to the Slow": Cantor Poetry Prize, Telluride Institute, 2022
- "North of Mist": Keats Soul Making Award, Janice Farrell Poetry First Prize, 2020
- "The Nature of it All:" Keats Soul Making Award, Kathleen McClung “Beloved” Sonnet Third Prize, 2020
- Finalist, Colorado Poet Laureate, 2019
- Nevertheless: finalist Colorado Book Award, 2012
- "The Various Ways Oh My Can be Said": Mark Fischer Poetry Prize, 2007

== Bibliography ==
=== Anthologies ===
Best American Poetry, ed. Sherman Alexie, David Lehman (Simon & Schuster, 2015). ISBN 9781476708195 OCLC 894746852

Best American Poetry, ed. Natasha Tretheway, David Lehman (Simon & Schuster, 2017). ISBN 9781501127632 OCLC 1015685314

HERE, Poems for the Planet, ed. Elizabeth J. Coleman, with an introduction by His Holiness the Dali Lama (Copper Canyon Press, 2019). ISBN 9781556595417 OCLC 1050964228

Hot Sonnets, ed. Moira Eagan (Entasis Press, 2011). ISBN 9780980099997 OCLC 733042107

Irresistible Sonnets, ed. Mary Meriam (Headmistress Press, 2014). ISBN 9780615931517 OCLC 885199103

Literature, an Introduction to Poetry, Fiction, and Drama, ed. Dana Gioia and XJ Kennedy (Pearson, 2020). ISBN 9780134668468 OCLC 1040228058

Love Affairs at the Villa Nelle, ed. Julie Kane (Kelsay Books).

Manifest West, ed. Caleb Seeling (Western Press Books, 2017). ISBN 9781607327271 OCLC: 990506442

Nasty Women Poets, Subversive Verse, ed. Grace Bauer, Jule Kane (Lost Horse Press, 2016). ISBN 9780998196336 OCLC 985071573

The Quadrant Book of Poetry, Australia, ed. Les Murray (Quadrant Books, 2012). ISBN 9780980677867 OCLC 859577509

Western Weird, ed. Mark Todd (Western Press Books, #4 2015). ISBN 9781607324416 OCLC 921888503

Writing Motherhood, ed. Carolyn Jess-Cooke (Seren Books, 2017). ISBN 9781781723760 OCLC: 993289324

=== Poetry ===
What's That Supposed to Mean? (EXOT Books, 2010). ISBN 9780984424900 OCLC: 779996912

Nevertheless (Able Muse Press, 2011). ISBN 9780986533846 OCLC 809772835

The Dark Gnu and Other Poems (Able Muse Press, 2013). ISBN 9781927409138 OCLC 829388310

Slingshots and Love Plums (Able Muse Press, 2015). ISBN 9781927409527 OCLC 911135262

Wise to the West (Able Muse Press, 2022). ISBN 9781773491134 OCLC 1289617397
