= West Chester University Poetry Conference =

Poetry conference held in the U.S.

- Genre: Formalist poetic craft conference
- Frequency: Defunct
- Locations: West Chester University, West Chester, PA 19383, United States
- Participants: 300 poets and poetry scholars
- Website: WCU Poetry Conference
- Founders; Michael Peich Dana Gioia

The West Chester University Poetry Conference was an international poetry conference that was held annually from 1995 to 2019 at West Chester University, Pennsylvania, United States. It hosted various panel discussions and poetry craft workshops, which focused primarily on formal poetry, narrative poetry, New Formalism and Expansive Poetry. It was the largest poetry-only conference in America and possibly the world as well as the only conference which focused on traditional craft.

== History ==
The conference was founded in 1995 by West Chester professor Michael Peich and poet Dana Gioia with 85 poets and scholars in attendance. The original core faculty members included Annie Finch, R. S. Gwynn, Mark Jarman, Robert McDowell, and Timothy Steele. While some of these faculty still return regularly to teach, the faculty has expanded in recent years to include Kim Addonizio, Rhina Espaillat, B. H. Fairchild, Rachel Hadas, Molly Peacock, Mary Jo Salter, A. E. Stallings, and many other widely published New Formalists.

Starting in 1999, the conference's program began including an art song concert.

In 2003, Gioia stepped down as co-director of the conference in order to become chairman of the National Endowment for the Arts.

The 2010 conference was the 16th and last year with Peich as director before he retired and passed the position to Kim Bridgford. By this time, the conference attendance had increased to 300 poets and poetry scholars. That year's concert of art song featured Natalie Merchant, who sung the poetry of various poets of the past. On June 12, the last day of the conference, the Queen's Birthday Honours 2010 were announced, including British comic poet Wendy Cope's appointment as an Officer of the Order of the British Empire.

R. S. Gwynn was named Program Director in September, 2015. His innovations included the initiation of a "Great Debates" series, the first of which, "Poetry or Verse?" was conducted by the poets James Matthew Wilson and Robert Archambeau.

2019 was the last year the conference was held.

== Awards given ==
Books that have won the Donald Justice Poetry Prize display this logo on the cover

Every year, the WCU Poetry Conference gives out three Iris N. Spencer Poetry Awards, the most notable one being the nationally-competitive Donald Justice Poetry Prize. The other two were given to recognize local regional undergraduate work in the Philadelphia metropolitan area of Pennsylvania until 2012, when they were expanded to become nationally-competitive prizes.

== Keynote speakers ==
- 1995 — Richard Wilbur
- 1996 — Donald Justice
- 1997 — Anthony Hecht
- 1998 — Wendy Cope
- 1999 — X. J. Kennedy
- 2000 — Louis Simpson
- 2001 — Marilyn Nelson
- 2002 — Nina Cassian
- 2003 — William Jay Smith
- 2004 — Dana Gioia
- 2005 — Anne Stevenson
- 2006 — James Fenton
- 2007 — Kay Ryan
- 2008 — Richard Wilbur
- 2009 — Donald Hall
- 2010 — Rhina Espaillat
- 2011 — Robert Pinsky
- 2012 — Christian Wiman
- 2013 — Julia Alvarez
- 2014 — Natasha Trethewey
- 2016 — Sir Andrew Motion
- 2017 — A.E. Stallings
- 2018 — Timothy Steele
- 2019 — David Yezzi
- 2020 — NONE

== See also ==
- Mezzo Cammin, a journal of formalist poetry by women, associated with the WCU Poetry Conference
- Poetry
- American poetry
- List of years in poetry
