= The Dark Horse (magazine) =

Literary magazine based in Scotland

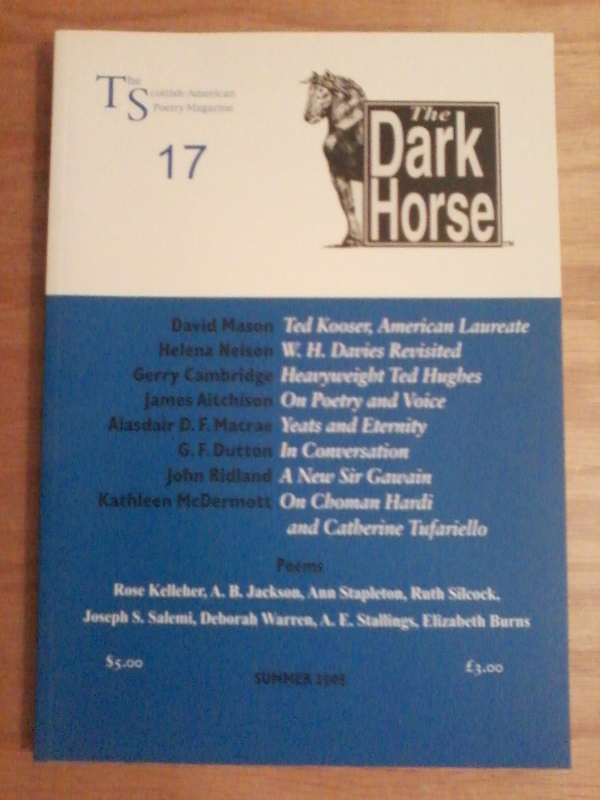
- Issue 17, Summer 2005
- Editor: Gerry Cambridge
- U.S. Assistant Editor: Jennifer Goodrich
- U.S. Contributing Editor: Marcia Menter
- Categories: Poetry
- Frequency: Semiannual
- Format: Print
- Founder: Gerry Cambridge
- Founded: 1995
- Country: Scotland
- Based in: South Lanarkshire
- Language: English
- Website: thedarkhorsemagazine.com
- ISSN: 1357-6720

The Dark Horse is an international literary magazine based in Scotland. Founded in 1995 by Scottish poet Gerry Cambridge, it publishes British, Irish, and American poetry as well as literary criticism and interviews. Past contributors include Wendy Cope, Douglas Dunn, Vicki Feaver, Anthony Hecht, Kathleen Raine, Kay Ryan, Matthew Sweeney, Robert Nye, and Richard Wilbur.

According to Malcolm Ballin of Cardiff University, The Dark Horse is Scotland's "best-established little magazine." In 2015, the magazine celebrated its twentieth anniversary with launch events in Edinburgh, London, and New York. On its twentieth anniversary, Alan Taylor wrote that the longevity of the magazine is "no small achievement."

They require postal submissions, but have a poor reputation for responding. Some poets cite years of waiting with no response, despite multiple polite follow-up emails. This has caused some split feelings within the poetry world, with poets feeling that the magazine is really worth reading, but their treatment of submitters leaves something to be desired.
