= David Mason (writer) =

American poet

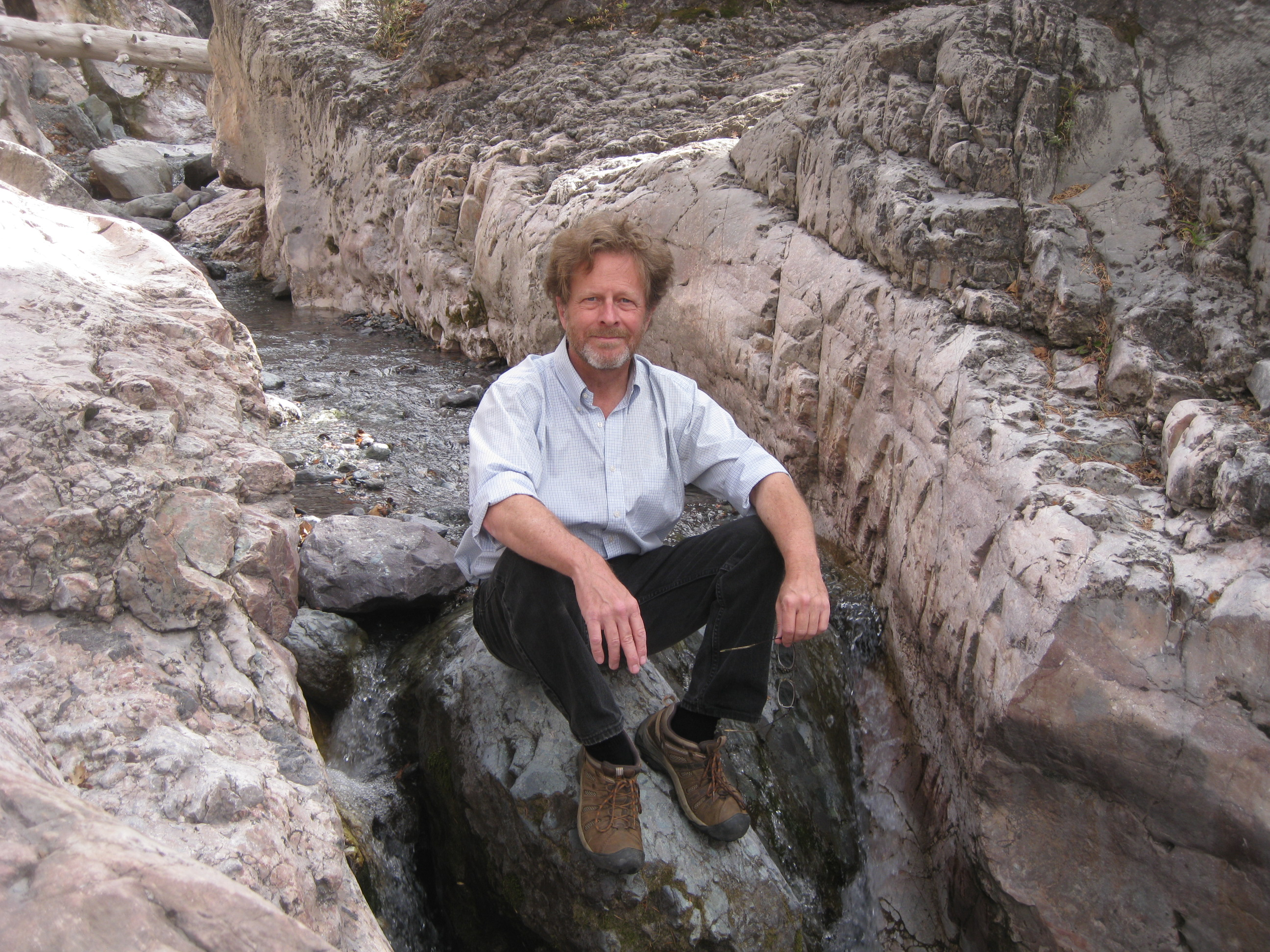
- David Mason Outdoors in 2012, taken by Christine Mason
- Born: December 11, 1954 (age 71); Bellingham, Washington, U.S.
- Occupations: Professor; writer; poet
- Spouse: Christine Mason (a.k.a. Cally Conan-Davies)

David Mason (born December 11, 1954) is an American writer and the former Poet Laureate of Colorado.

== Life ==
David Mason was born and raised in Bellingham, Washington. He studied briefly at the Colorado College, but left after one year to work as a fisherman in Alaska. He returned to the college to earn his B.A. in 1978. Mason and then-wife, Jonna Heinrich, moved to Rochester, New York, where he worked as a gardener. In 1980 they went to Greece, where they lived for just over a year in Kardamyli, Greece, in the Mani district of southernmost part of the Peloponnesus. While living there he became a friend of the British travel author and war hero, Patrick Leigh Fermor. Mason returned to the United States when he was hired to write the screenplay for a film based on a novel he had written. In the end the film was canceled when the production company closed its film division.

After a part-time teaching stint at Colorado College, he began studying at the University of Rochester under Anthony Hecht. His first marriage ended, and in 1988 he married Scottish photojournalist Anne Lennox. He received his doctorate from The University of Rochester and moved to Moorhead, Minnesota, where he taught at Minnesota State University Moorhead for ten years. In 1994, Mason was named the Minnesota Outstanding Professor of the Year. Mason spent the academic year of 1996–97 in Greece on a Fulbright fellowship, where he continued to perfect his Greek, meet Greek intellectuals and writers, translate and write, and visit old places from 16 years earlier. In 1998, Mason returned to his alma mater, Colorado College, where he now co-directs the Creative Writing program. In 2010 Mason was named Colorado Poet Laureate, for a four-year term ending in the summer of 2014. He and wife Anne Lennox lived in Colorado Springs, Colorado until the marriage ended in 2012. Currently he lives in Manitou Springs, Colorado with his wife, Australian poet Cally Conan-Davies. The post of Colorado Poet Laureate comes with a small stipend and an expectation of ten public appearances in the state each of the four years in the term, but Mason chose to greatly expand on those expectations, attempting to visit all 64 counties of the state during his term in order to share poetry in public appearances. Mason and Conan-Davies moved to Australia in 2018.

== Work ==
David Mason's collections of poems include The Buried Houses (winner of the Nicholas Roerich Poetry Prize) and The Country I Remember (winner of the Alice Fay Di Castagnola Award). He is coeditor of four major anthologies and has authored dozens of poems, essays, reviews, translations, stories and memoirs. An advisory editor at the Hudson Review, the Sewanee Review and Divide, Mason's work can be found in such periodicals as The New Yorker, Harper's, The Nation, The New Republic, The New York Times, The Times Literary Supplement, Poetry, Agenda, Modern Poetry in Translation, The New Criterion, Yale Review, The Hudson Review, The American Scholar, The Irish Times, and The Southern Review.

A collection of his work "Sea Salt: Poems of a Decade, 2004–2014" was published in 2014 by Red Hen Press, followed in 2018 by "The Sound: new and Selected Poems" and in 2022 by "Pacific Light."

=== Ludlow ===
David Mason is especially noted for his historical novel in verse, Ludlow, about the Ludlow Massacre in Ludlow, Colorado, on April 20, 1914. Mason's personal connections to the event include a great-grandfather, George Mason, settled in Huerfano County in the late 19th century and ran, in Mason's words, "one of the notorious 'company stores' that cheated the miners near Ludlow." An additional connection to a different part of Colorado is that Mason's maternal grandfather, a coal miner turned physician, is remembered in Grand Junction as the "last of the horse-and-buggy-doctors." Mason adapted Ludlow into an opera in partnership with composer, Lori Laitman.

== Bibliography ==
=== Books ===
- "Incarnation and Metamorphosis: Can Literature Change Us?" Paul Dry Books, 2023.
- "Pacific Light". Red Hen Press 2022.
- "The Sound: New and Selected Poems". Red HenPress, 2018.
- Voices, Places: Essays. Philadelphia, PA: Paul Dry Books, 2018.
- Davey McGravy: Tales to be Read Aloud to Children and Adult Children. Illustrated by Grant Silverstein. Philadelphia, PA: Paul Dry Books, 2015.
- Sea Salt: Poems of a Decade, 2004–2014, 2014.
- "The Scarlet Libretto." Red Hen Press, 2012.
- Essays by David Mason: Two Minds of a Western Poet. University of Michigan Press, 2011.
- News from the Village. Los Angeles, CA: Red Hen Press, 2010.
- Ludlow. Los Angeles, CA: Red Hen Press, 2007. Second edition 2010.
- Arrivals. Ashland, OR: Story Line Press, 2004.
- The Poetry of Life and the Life of Poetry. Story Line Press, 2000.
- The Country I Remember. Ashland, OR: Story Line Press, 1996.

=== Edited ===
- Twentieth Century American Poetry. With Dana Gioia and Meg Schoerke. New York: McGraw-Hill, 2004.
- Twentieth Century American Poetics: Poets on the Art of Poetry. With Dana Gioia and Meg Schoerke. New York: McGraw-Hill, 2004.
- Western Wind: An Introduction to Poetry. With John Frederick Nims. New York: McGraw-Hill. 5th ed. 2005.
- Rebel Angels: 25 Poets of the New Formalism. With Mark Jarman. Ashland, OR: Story Line Press, 1996. Second printing 1998.

== Criticism About ==
- “David Mason and the Human Place.” by Andrew Frisardi. Contemporary Poetry Review. March 6, 2008.
- David Mason: A Critical Introduction. by Gregory Dowling. Story Line Press, 2013. Expanded edition published in 2023.
