= John Whitworth (poet) =

British poet (1945–2019)

- Born: 11 December 1945; Nashik, India
- Died: 20 April 2019 (aged 73); Canterbury, Kent, England
- Education: James Gillespie's High School; Royal High School, Edinburgh
- Alma mater: Merton College, Oxford
- Occupation: Poet
- Spouse: Doreen Roberts
- Children: Ellie and Katie
- Writing career
- Language: English
- Notable awards: Cholmondeley Award; 1988

John Whitworth (11 December 1945 - 20 April 2019) was a British poet. Born in India in 1945, he began writing poetry at Merton College, Oxford. He went on to win numerous prizes and publish in many highly regarded venues. He published twelve books: ten collections of his own work, an anthology of which he was the editor, and a textbook on writing poetry.

== Life ==
Whitworth was born in India in 1945. He graduated from Merton College, Oxford. His work appeared in Poetry Review, The Times Literary Supplement, London Magazine, The Spectator, Quadrant, New Poetry, The Flea, Chimaera, HyperTexts, Light, Qualm, and Shit Creek Review. He taught a master class at University of Kent. He was a judge for the 9th Poetry on the Lake Competition, 2009. He read at Lamar University. He read at the 9th annual Sarah Lawrence College Poetry Festival 2012.

He was married to Doreen Roberts, who taught at the University of Kent; they had two daughters, Ellie and Katie.

== Awards ==
- 1988 Cholmondeley Award
- 2004 The Silver Wyvern, Poetry on the Lake
- 2009 Eleanor Room Poetry Award Lamar University
- 2011 Literary Review £5000 Poetry Prize

== Bibliography ==
=== Poetry ===
Collections

- Whitworth, John (1980). Unhistorical fragments. London: Secker & Warburg.
- — (1982). Poor butterflies. London: Secker & Warburg.
- — (1985). Lovely day for a wedding. Secker & Warburg.
- — (1989). Tennis and sex and death. Peterloo.
- — (1993). Landscape with small humans. Peterloo.
- — (1998). From the sonnet history of modern poetry. Illustrated by Gerald Mangan. Peterloo.
- — (2002). The Whitworth gun. Peterloo.
- — (2007). Being the bad guy. Peterloo.
- — (2011). Girlie gangs. Enitharmon.
- — (2016). Joy in the morning. Kelsay.

Anthologies

- Whitworth, John, ed. (1997). The Faber book of blue verse. Faber.
- —, ed. (2006). Making love to Marilyn Monroe : the Faber book of blue verse. Faber and Faber.

List of poems

Title	Year	First published	Reprinted/collected
Orriblerevelationsinighlife	2016	Whitworth, John (January–February 2016). "Orriblerevelationsinighlife". Quadrant. 60 (1–2): 142.	
Twelve don'ts for the aged	2016	Whitworth, John (January–February 2016). "Twelve don'ts for the aged". Quadrant. 60 (1–2): 4.	
Variation on a forgotten theme of James Fenton	2016	Whitworth, John (January–February 2016). "Variation on a forgotten theme of James Fenton". Quadrant. 60 (1–2): 111.	

=== Non-fiction ===
- Whitworth, John (1989). "Poetry into print". Writers' and Artists' Yearbook. A & C Black.
- — (2001). Writing poetry. A & C Black.
- — (2006). Writing poetry (Revised 2nd ed.). A & C Black.
