= Richard Wakefield =

American poet, and literary critic

- Born: July 1, 1952
- Education: Fullerton College (AA), Cal State Fullerton (BA), University of Washington (MA, PhD)
- Occupations: Poet, Literary Critic, Professor
- Spouse(s): Catherine Wakefield, 1973-present

Richard Wakefield is an American poet, literary critic, and a Professor of Humanities. He is the author of three collections of poetry (see below), as well as hundreds of articles published both in print and online. He has taught at the University of Washington Tacoma, and The Evergreen State College. He currently teaches at Tacoma Community College.

== Early life ==
Richard Wakefield was born on July 1, 1952, to Edward Henry Wakefield (1917-1994) a sporting goods salesman and Louise Renee Wakefield, née Herzberg, (1918-2000) a homemaker and landscape painter. He is the youngest of three sons. Richard spent the majority of his childhood living in the Pacific Northwest, living in the Wallingford neighborhood of Seattle, Portland, OR, and five years in southern California. His interest in literature took root at a young age, with a fond childhood memory of working through a bilingual copy of Chaucer’s Canterbury Tales. Poetry also became a part of Richard’s life at a young age, with his first poem published at the age of 15 in Medford, OR. Much like his poetry, Richard is deeply rooted in the Pacific Northwest, with prominent figures who helped build and showcase the region in his family tree. He is a great-great grandson of Robert Wakefield, a structural engineer and contractor who helped build major bridges, rail lines, and water systems throughout Washington and Oregon spanning the nineteenth and twentieth centuries. He is also a grandson of Paul Herzberg, a noted Pacific Northwest landscape painter of the early twentieth century.

== Education ==
Richard graduated from Sorona High School in 1970 and began college courses in the fall of 1970. After completing his AA at Fullerton College, Wakefield enrolled at Cal State Fullerton where he majored in English. It was during his time at Cal State Fullerton that he met his future wife, Catherine Wakefield (née Taylor) through mutual friends and family. Richard and Catherine, who earned a degree in Sociology at the University of California Riverside, married in the summer of 1973 and moved north to the Seattle metropolitan area, where Richard enrolled at the University of Washington for his Master of Arts degree in English and Creative Writing. His Master’s thesis remains the unpublished novel titled The Goat Woman. He continued on to the PhD program at UW, earning his doctorate in English with a concentration in American Literature under the direction of Jack Brenner and Roger Sale in 1983.

His dissertation focused on the life, work, and philosophy of Robert Frost, a writer whose work was under-appreciated at that time. His dissertation, Robert Frost and the Opposing Lights of the Hour, received wide-praise for originality, and is recognized as a cornerstone of scholarship on Frost. The later publication of his dissertation with Peter Lang Publishing in 1984 was cited for Outstanding Scholarship in American Literature.

== Professional life ==
Wakefield was offered a position in the English department at the University of Washington as a full-time instructor upon completing his PhD. While doing so, he also worked part-time teaching composition at Central Washington University. Richard took a departure from academia when he was offered and accepted a position at Boeing Aerospace, working on NASA projects–including the Space Shuttle and what would become the International Space Station–in 1984. He continued to teach American Literature part-time at Central Washington University.

He left Boeing in 1985 to return to full-time teaching. He was hired as a full-time, tenure-track position at Tacoma Community College, where he continues to teach as a tenured Professor of Humanities. After taking the job at TCC, Wakefield and his wife relocated to Federal Way, WA. Even while teaching full-time and engaging in scholarship, poetry, and serving as a literary critic for the Seattle times, he continued to teach part-time at Central Washington University until 1991. In that same year he took a position as an adjunct Professor at the University of Washington Tacoma until 2011. He taught for two years in a faculty exchange program with The Evergreen State College, and two years as visiting faculty at The Bridge, a college outreach program in Tacoma’s Hilltop neighborhood. In 2000, Wakefield was selected for the Outstanding Faculty Award at Tacoma Community College.

In addition to teaching a double-load, Wakefield started working for the Seattle Times as a literary and poetry critic from 1984 to 2012, publishing hundreds of reviews over his thirty-two years with the publisher. He also served as a contributing editor to Publishing Northwest throughout the 1980s. Over his career he has published hundreds of articles and contributing chapters in American Literature, Art, and Philosophy published in American Literature, Midwest Quarterly, Sewanee Review, The Robert Frost Review, the Journal of the Williams James Society, among many others. He was poetry editor of Able Muse in the early 2020s. Alongside his academic publications, he has published over 300 poems in various print and online journals. His work has appeared in American Literature, Sewanee Review, Midwest Quarterly, Light, Seattle Review, Atlanta Review, Tampa Review, Neovictorian, Bellowing Ark, and Edge City Review.

== Poetry ==
Wakefield published his first standalone collection of poems in 2006 titled East of Early Winters, which was awarded the Richard Wilbur Award. His next collection, A Vertical Mile, was published in 2012 and was short-listed for the Poet’s Prize. His third, and most recent collection, was published in April 2022 titled Terminal Park.

== Personal life ==
Richard Wakefield was a long-distance runner who completed ten marathons and several ultra-marathons. He is a hiker in the Pacific Northwest, and the region is the subject of his poetry. He travels with his wife, Catherine, to landmarks in the region.

He has played guitar and piano since childhood. Wakefield has shifted to American folk music and has expanded his arsenal of stringed instruments to include the Ukulele, banjo, and 12-string acoustic guitar. For several years in the 1990s he was co-owner of Rosewood Guitar, a dealer of fine instruments and accessories.

In addition to hiking and music, Wakefield also loves old cars, planes, trains, and farming equipment. He is a member and a frequent visitor to the LeMay Car Museum in Tacoma, WA, as well as the extended LeMay family collection in Parkland, WA. He is a keen Model-T enthusiast and multiple time participant in the LeMay Museum’s Model-T driving course.

Richard has been happily married to Catherine Wakefield since 1973. They have two daughters: Eleanor Wakefield, a fellow academic who teaches at the University of Oregon and is married to David Nyland; and Mary Wakefield, a Senior Oncology Clinical Research Manager at the Knight Cancer Institute at the Oregon Health and Science University in Portland, OR. He has two grandchildren.

== Awards ==
- 2006 Richard Wilbur Award (For his East of Early Winters: poems, poetry anthology)
- 2009 Howard Nemerov Sonnet Award

== Publications ==
- Robert Frost and the Opposing Lights of the Hour, Peter Lang Publishing, 1985
- East of Early Winters: poems, University of Evansville Press, 2006, ISBN 978-0-930982-63-8
- A Vertical Mile: poems, Able Muse Press, 2012
- Terminal Park. Able Muse Press, 2022
