= Peter Wyton =

Peter Wyton is a 'poet of page and performance' who has published a number of books and who has appeared on BBC Radio. He is a widely published and prize-winning poet who has appeared at venues as diverse as Cheltenham Literature Festival, Glastonbury Festival, Ledbury Poetry Festival, Oxford TV, Lewes Prison and arts centres and theatres throughout the United Kingdom. His work has appeared on BBC Radio 4's Poetry Please and Something Understood, and has been nominated for the Forward Poetry Prize. He also reached the final of Radio 4's first Poetry Slam.

== Early life ==
At 12, Peter Wyton was financing his collection of Arthur Ransome books on Children's Hour, which paid seven shillings and sixpence in book-tokens per broadcast.

== Later life ==
He is published by Tempus Publishing, Stroud, Gloucestershire and has been twice nominated for the Forward Poetry Prize. He was Gloucestershire 1000 Poet Laureate. In 2008 he published Not All Men Are From Mars (A Poetry Book for Women's Aid), a collection of 55 poems centred on women, including a range of themes from violence and discrimination, to individual women of historical importance.

== Works ==
- Future Dances (1997)
- Last of the late developers: The performance poetry of Peter Wyton (1999)
- Even the Beggars have Pearls (2001)
- Dad's Taxi Service: And Other Poems (2004)
- The Ship in the City (2006)
- Not All Men Are From Mars (2008)
