= Alison Brackenbury =

British poet

- Born: 1953 (age 72–73); Gainsborough, Lincolnshire, England, UK
- Awards: Eric Gregory Award, Cholmondeley Award

Alison Brackenbury (born 1953) is a British poet. She has published ten full-length collections of poetry and two selected volumes, as well as reviews, articles, and radio broadcasts. She has won the Eric Gregory Award and the Cholmondeley Award.

== Life ==
Brackenbury was born in Gainsborough, Lincolnshire and attended the local village school and then Brigg High School. She studied English at St Hugh's College, Oxford. Since leaving Oxford, she has lived in Gloucestershire.

In the late 1970s and the 1980s, Brackenbury worked as a librarian in a technical college and as a clerical assistant. From 1990 to 2012, when she retired, she was a director, bookkeeper, and manual worker in her family's metal finishing firm.

== Career ==
Brackenbury's first collection, Dreams of Power, was published by Carcanet Press in 1981. It was selected as a Poetry Book Society Recommendation. In 1982, it won an Eric Gregory Award, given for collections by poets under the age of thirty.

Between 1985 and 1995, Carcanet published three new collections by Brackenbury, plus a Selected Poems in 1991. In 1997, Brackenbury won a Cholmondeley Award, given each year to four distinguished poets.

Brackenbury published four further collections with Carcanet between 2000 and 2016. In 2019, Carcanet published a second volume of selected poems, Gallop.

Brackenbury's most recent collection was Thorpeness, in 2022.

Brackenbury's work has appeared in many journals, including the Kenyon Review, Ploughshares, Stand, and PN Review, where she has been published multiple times since her first appearance in 1980. Her poetry has also been broadcast on BBC radio.

Brackenbury's other published and broadcast work includes articles and reviews on poetry, the arts, and English and British folk song, and a memoir of her grandmother, Aunt Margaret's Pudding, which includes recipes and poems.

In 2019, Brackenbury selected poems for and introduced the Candlestick Press anthology Ten Poems about Horses.

== Awards ==
- 1981 Poetry Book Society Recommendation
- 1982 Eric Gregory Award
- 1997 Cholmondeley Award

== Works ==
=== Books ===
- Dreams of Power. Carcanet New Press. 1981. ISBN 978-0-85635-352-9.
- Breaking Ground. Carcanet. 1985. ISBN 978-0-85635-503-5.
- Christmas Roses. Carcanet. 1988. ISBN 978-0-85635-750-3.
- Selected Poems. Carcanet. 1991. ISBN 978-0-85635-924-8.
- 1829. Carcanet. 1995. ISBN 978-1-85754-122-9.
- After Beethoven. Carcanet. 2000. ISBN 978-1-85754-454-1.
- The Story of Sigurd. The Gruffyground Press. 2003. ISBN 0905572262.
- Bricks and Ballads. Carcanet. 2004. ISBN 978-1-85754-751-1.
- Singing in the Dark. Carcanet. 2008. ISBN 978-1-85754-914-0.
- Shadow. HappenStance. 2009. ISBN 978-1-905939-35-0.
- Then. Carcanet. 2013. ISBN 978-1847771186.
- Skies. Carcanet. 2016. ISBN 978-1784101800.
- Aunt Margaret's Pudding. HappenStance. 2018. ISBN 978-1910131435.
- Gallop: Selected Poems. Carcanet. 2019. ISBN 978-1784106959.
- Thorpeness. Carcanet. 2022. ISBN 978-1800172258.

=== Select journal publications ===
- "In the gap"; "Affairs"; "Plucked from", The Chimera, October 2007
- "When"; "Mud"; "March ending"; "Passing", nthposition, March 2008
- "6.25", The Guardian, 2 February 2008
- "Obit". Magma 39. November 2007.
- "Autumn Street". Magma 19.
