= Timothy Steele =

American poet (born 1948)

- Born: January 22, 1948 (age 78) Burlington, Vermont, U.S.
- Education: Stanford University; Brandeis University
- Spouse: Victoria Lee Steele

Timothy Steele (born January 22, 1948) is an American poet, who generally writes in meter and rhyme. His early poems, which began appearing in the 1970s in such magazines as Poetry, The Southern Review, and X. J. Kennedy's Counter/Measures, are said to have anticipated and contributed to the revival of traditional verse associated with the New Formalism. He, however, has objected to being called a New Formalist, saying that he doesn't claim to be doing anything technically novel and that Formalism "suggests, among other things, an interest in style rather than substance, whereas I believe that the two are mutually vital in any successful poem." Notwithstanding his reservations about the term, Steele's poetry is more strictly "formal" than the work of most New Formalists in that he rarely uses inexact rhymes or metrical substitutions, and is sparing in his use of enjambment.

In addition to four collections of poems, Steele is the author of two books on prosody: Missing Measures, a study of the literary and historical background of modern free verse; and All the Fun's in How You Say a Thing, an introduction to English versification. Steele was an original faculty member of the West Chester University Poetry Conference, and received its Robert Fitzgerald Prosody Award in 2004.

== Education ==
Born in Burlington, Vermont in 1948, Steele attended the city's public schools. At an early age, he became interested in poetry, including that of Robert Frost, who was appointed the state's Poet Laureate in 1961, and William Shakespeare, several of whose plays were staged each summer at a Shakespeare festival at the University of Vermont in Burlington.

Steele received his baccalaureate degree in English (1970) from Stanford University and a master's (1972) and doctorate (1977) in English and American Literature from Brandeis University, where he studied with the well-known poet and Renaissance scholar J. V. Cunningham, a collected edition of whose poems Steele would later edit.

== Career ==
From 1975 to 1977 Steele served as a Jones Lecturer in poetry at Stanford. Subsequently, he held lectureships at UCLA and UC Santa Barbara. He is an emeritus professor in the English Department at California State University, Los Angeles, where he taught from 1987 until 2012.

== Poetry ==
Steele's poems fuse traditional verse forms with contemporary subjects and, in Kennedy's words, "express appreciation both for the life of the mind and for the sensuous world." Writing in Library Journal, Rob Fure characterized Steele's first collection, Uncertainties and Rest (1979), as "a lovely book ... the formality of Steele's poetry is so delicate that it never intimidates." Of his second book, Sapphics against Anger and Other Poems (1986), Kathryn Hellerstein wrote in Partisan Review, "Steele's formal range is impressive. Each poem works in a different stanza ... Their subjects, evoked in exquisite imagery, are entryways to noumena, the pure abstractions of the mind." Speaking in The Sewanee Review of The Color Wheel (1994), R. S. Gwynn said, "Timothy Steele's poetry exemplifies the order that he praises, but ultimately it is both the charity and the clarity of his vision that are most remarkable." And Booklist's Ray Olson, reviewing Toward the Winter Solstice (2006), described Steele as "so technically adroit that he could write about anything and produce a poem repeatedly rewarding for music and shapeliness alone."

Critics have pointed to Yvor Winters and Cunningham as having influenced Steele's work and have noted his particular affinity with Frost. As Donald G. Sheehy says in his essay "Measure for Measure: The Frostian Classicism of Timothy Steele": "Steele recalls Frost in his subtle mastery of form, in his philosophical and aesthetic moderation, in his sympathetic but unsentimental attention to the natural world and to the vicissitudes of love and marriage, and in the gently incisive wit with which he meets human foible, public and private."

In an interview in 1991 with the Los Angeles Times, Steele explained his goals in using traditional poetic structure: "Well-used meter and rhyme can create a sense of liveliness and a symmetry and surprise that can produce delight and pleasure for the reader ... I want to say something important. And I would hope the reader would be interested in it. But I also hope to give the reader pleasure."

== Works about versification ==
Steele's two books on versification have attracted considerable attention. Steele's explanation of versification in All the Fun's in How You Say a Thing was first published in 1995 by Ohio University Press. A steady seller, it was reissued in 2024 in a 25th anniversary edition. Designed for the general readers of poetry, students and teachers of literature, and aspiring poets, the book has also been widely consulted and cited by linguists and literary historians as a mine of entertaining information about verse technique. Upon its original publication in 1999, the reviewer for the TLS wrote, “Steele’s elegantly written book, as entertaining and readable as it is erudite and taxonomically precise, successfully explains—in so far as it is possible to do so—how metre, in being predictable, allows for what is wholly unpredictable.” Drawing from the entire range of English-language poetry since Chaucer, which Robert B. Shaw calls "indicative of an impressive breadth of learning and a lively catholicity of taste ... This book defines a notably high standard for future writers in the field to emulate." In a blurb for the 25th anniversary edition, Stephen Fry wrote, “Before you go to meet your maker, go to make your meter. And you couldn’t be in better hands than those of Timothy Steele. His friendly but deeply knowledgeable guide to versification marks a quarter century of informing, yes, but most importantly inspiring generations to feel confident and excited about poetic forms. He takes them out of the lecture hall and blows away the dust of the schoolroom.”

Missing Measures: Modern Poetry and the Revolt Against Meter examines the ideas and conditions that led many poets, in the late nineteenth and early twentieth century, to challenge poetry's traditional principles of rhythmical organization and to develop new forms of verse without the regular units of measure that had characterized earlier verse. Among other topics, the book explores the legacy of Aristotle's dual view of poetry as, on the one hand, a rhetorical art of metrical speech and, on the other hand, a mimetic art that does not necessarily involve meter. The book also examines the shift in Romantic aesthetics from the belief that artists objectively represent the world outside them to the belief that they subjectively express their inner feelings. Another subject of discussion is the increasing prominence in imaginative literature, in the eighteenth century and afterwards, of prose forms like the novel. Yet another topic is the sense among modern poets and artists that the physical sciences have moved into the central position in culture and that the arts should, to keep up with science, adopt its methods and become "experimental." And the book documents the way a number of leading modern poets came to feel that meter itself was inextricably bound up with the dated idioms of Victorian verse and that to break with or reform Victorian style it was also necessary to break with or reform meter. More specifically, the book observes how free verse—originally regarded by the great early modern poets as a temporary expedient to bring new life into poetry and as a challenge to poets to think freshly about their art—ramified into increasingly divergent modes and became, over the course of the twentieth century, a predominant means of poetic expression.

Some reviewers of Missing Measures praised the book for its depth of historical information and analysis and considered reasonable Steele's concluding argument on behalf of preserving metrical tradition. Writing in the TLS, Clive Wilmer spoke of Steele as "a considerable scholar ... moving with ease across two-and-a-half millennia of critical thought on the subject of metre" and summarized the book as "wise and engrossing." Other reviewers interpreted Missing Measures as involving or implying a broadly and unwarrantedly negative assessment of the free verse tradition. Yet even reviewers who did not wholly share Steele's views appear to have felt that his book revealed and illuminated aspects of modern poetry that had been overlooked or insufficiently considered. Steele himself has said that he does not object to free verse--"Free verse," he maintains, "is just as much poetry as verse is"—but to the idea that it has superseded meter and rendered it obsolete. Though acknowledging he feels a special interest in metrical composition, he has insisted that his preference "is personal and aesthetic, however; I have never imagined that it provided me with access to cultural or spiritual virtue. And despite opinions to the contrary about Missing Measures, I have never said that vers libre is somehow wrong and immoral or that meter is somehow right and pure. The experimental school of Pound, Eliot, Lawrence, and Williams has its own beauties and achievements. But we can prize them justly and build on them, it seems to me, only if we retain a knowledge and appreciation of the time-tested principles of standard versification. Free verse cannot be free, unless there is something for it to be free of."

== Influence ==
Observers agree that Steele's work has influenced the development of recent American verse. Kevin Walzer wrote in 1996 in The Tennessee Quarterly, "His achievement as a poet...is such that he differs from the mainstream far less today than when he began writing--an important marker of the range and substance of his influence. In short, he has helped to change the course of the stream." Joseph O. Aimone noted in 2003 in The Dictionary of Literary Biography, "Readers of poetry with a feel for formal verse can already find an interesting and gratifying wealth of invention in Steele's three volumes of poems. Those who care for explanations of versification and poetic history will find his two volumes of prose useful and readable. Those arbiters of and reporters on shifting tastes will have to take him as a reference point to orient any serious discussion of the renascent strains of traditional verse in American poetry." And Susan Clair Imbarrato commented in 2006, in The Greenwood Encyclopedia of American Poets and Poetry, that Steele's "use of traditional forms and precise, accessible language has repositioned formal prosody into the rich palette of contemporary poetry."

== Bibliography ==
Poetry

- Uncertainties and Rest (LSU Press, 1979)
- Sapphics against Anger and Other Poems (Random House, 1986)
- The Color Wheel (Johns Hopkins University Press, 1994)
- Sapphics and Uncertainties (University of Arkansas Press, 1995) This volume reprints, in slightly revised form, Steele's first two collections.
- Toward the Winter Solstice (Ohio University Press/Swallow Press, 2006)

Non-fiction

- Missing Measures: Modern Poetry and the Revolt against Meter (University of Arkansas Press, 1990)
- All the Fun's in How You Say a Thing: An Explanation of Meter and Versification (Ohio University Press/Swallow Press, 1999 and 2024)
- Three Poets in Conversation: Dick Davis, Rachel Hadas, Timothy Steele (Between the Lines, 2006)

Edited

- The Music of His History: Poems for Charles Gullans on His Sixtieth Birthday (Robert L. Barth Press, 1989)
- The Poems of J. V. Cunningham (Ohio University Press/Swallow Press, 1997)

Scholarship

- Timothy Steele: A Critical Introduction by James Matthew Wilson (Story Line Press, 2012)
- Timothy Steele: A Bibliography, 1957-2018 compiled by Jack W.C. Hagstrom and Joshua S. Odell (Joshua Odell Editions, 2018)
