= Smartish Pace =

American literary journal

- Editor: Stephen Reichert
- Categories: Literary journal
- Frequency: Annually
- Total circulation: 1,100
- First issue: 1999
- Company: Smartish Pace
- Country: United States
- Based in: Baltimore, Maryland
- Language: English
- Website: www.smartishpace.com
- ISSN: 1532-3218

Smartish Pace is a non-profit, independent literary journal based in Baltimore, Maryland, USA. The magazine was founded in 1999 by Stephen Reichert who was a University of Maryland School of Law student at the time. The name, Smartish Pace, originates from a tort case in which a horse carriage, which was travelling at "a smartish pace," ran over and killed a donkey. Smartish Pace has published poems by the following Pulitzer Prize or National Book Award winners: Carl Phillips, Martín Espada, Terrance Hayes, Rae Armantrout, Mark Doty, Natasha Trethewey, Philip Schultz, Claudia Emerson, Nathaniel Mackey, Ted Kooser, Paul Muldoon, Yusef Komunyakaa, Carl Dennis, Stephen Dunn, Mary Oliver, Andrew Hudgins, Henry Taylor, Gerald Stern, Maxine Kumin, and Anthony Hecht. The magazine has also debuted previously unpublished letters of Elizabeth Bishop and award-winning new translations of Tomas Tranströmer. When referencing places Pulitzer Prize winner Claudia Emerson had published, Newsweek called the journal "obscure". As of Clifford Garstang's 2023 Literary Magazine Rankings, Smartish Pace was ranked one of the top ten poetry magazines in North America.

Smartish Pace’s website is the home of Poets Q & A, the first interactive poetry forum on the internet, where readers ask questions of well-known poets. Past poets who have participated in Poets Q & A include Carl Phillips, Sherman Alexie, Jorie Graham, Robert Creeley, Eavan Boland, Mark Doty, Robert Hass, Rae Armantrout, Carl Dennis, Stephen Dunn, Bob Hicok, Campbell McGrath, Robert Pinsky, Elizabeth Spires, and David Wojahn.

Smartish Pace was named "Best Poetry Journal" in 2007 by the Baltimore City Paper.

== Masthead ==
- Editor: Stephen Reichert
- Senior Editor: Daniel Todd
- Associate Editors: Clare Banks, William Camponovo, Dan Cryer, Traci O'Dea, Freeman Rogers
- Assistant Editors: Samuel Cheney, Meg Eden, Jared Fischer, Kari Hawkey, Jocelyn Heath, Kristin Lindholm, Austin Tremblay, Clifford Williams, Nicholas Anderson

== See also ==
- List of literary magazines
