= The Flea (poem) =

Poem by John Donne

"The Flea" is an erotic metaphysical poem (first published posthumously in 1633) by John Donne (1572–1631). The exact date of its composition is unknown, but it is probable that Donne wrote this poem in the 1590s when he was a young law student at Lincoln's Inn, before he became a respected religious figure as Dean of St Paul's Cathedral. The poem uses the conceit of a flea, which has sucked blood from the male speaker and his female lover, to serve as an extended metaphor for the relationship between them. The speaker tries to convince a lady to sleep with him, arguing that if their blood mingling in the flea is innocent, then sexual mingling would also be innocent. His argument hinges on the belief that bodily fluids mix during sexual intercourse.

According to Laurence Perrine, this poem, along with many other of Donne's poems, solidifies his place in the literary movement, creating what is now known as metaphysical poetry. Although the term was not found until after his death, it is still widely used and will continue to be traced back to work such as "The Flea".

== Content ==
The Flea

Mark but this flea, and mark in this,
How little that which thou deniest me is;
It suck'd me first, and now sucks thee,
And in this flea our two bloods mingled be.
Thou know'st that this cannot be said
A sin, nor shame, nor loss of maidenhead;
Yet this enjoys before it woo,
And pamper'd swells with one blood made of two;
And this, alas! is more than we would do.

O stay, three lives in one flea spare,
Where we almost, yea, more than married are.
This flea is you and I, and this
Our marriage bed, and marriage temple is.
Though parents grudge, and you, we're met,
And cloister'd in these living walls of jet.
Though use make you apt to kill me,
Let not to that self-murder added be,
And sacrilege, three sins in killing three.

Cruel and sudden, hast thou since
Purpled thy nail in blood of innocence?
Wherein could this flea guilty be,
Except in that drop which it suck'd from thee?
Yet thou triumph'st, and say'st that thou
Find'st not thyself nor me the weaker now.
'Tis true; then learn how false fears be;
Just so much honour, when thou yield'st to me,
Will waste, as this flea's death took life from thee.

— John Donne

The poem evokes the aphorism carpe diem, which is Latin for "seize the day". Donne encourages the lady to focus on the present day and time versus saving herself for the afterlife. Donne is able to hint at the erotic without explicitly referring to sex, using images such as the flea that "pamper'd swells" with the blood of the lady (line 8). This evokes the idea of an erection. The speaker complains that "This is more than we would do!" (line 9) The speaker says it would be "sacrilege" to kill the flea. He holds the flea up in the second stanza as "our marriage bed" and "our marriage temple", begging for the lady to spare its innocent life (line 13). He argues that by killing the flea, she would be killing herself, himself, and the flea itself, "Three crimes in killing three" (line 18). The lady, in the third stanza, kills the flea, presumably rejecting the speaker's advances. He then says she will lose no more honor when she decides to sleep with him than she did when she killed the flea.

== Criticism ==
Scholars have stated that Donne's work was not taboo during the 17th century due to other metaphorical references to the flea. Anthony Low wrote that Donne invented a new kind of private love that people can learn to appreciate. Achsah Guibbory challenged Low, saying "The Flea" focuses on Donne's capacity for arrogance and misogyny, making his poetry crude in today's society.

Guibbory further argued that the detailed descriptions of women's bodies in a sexual way give a negative reaction for today's women readers, while Low stated there is an initial shock for readers, but instead attempted to look at the poem as a tool to create a new space for mutual love in lyric poetry.

== Tone ==
Fleas were everywhere throughout the renaissance, both in real life and erotic poetry. Donne's speaker enviously describes the flea's ability to suck his mistress’ skin and amalgamate his fluids with hers, which is how 17th-century society viewed sex. Many lines allude to sex, such as the way the insect “swells” with blood in line eight to suggest a man's erection.

Despite its lewdness, Donne also relies on religious imagery to woo the virgin. There are commonalities to the Holy Trinity in regard to the man, woman, and flea. The speaker attempts to make his argument respectable when he suggests the flea's action makes the couple married, despite using a half rhyme instead of a complete one as if to undermine his argument because he knows it is false.

The conclusion is full of images of death: “make thee apt to kill me”, and “self-murder” as the lady purples her finger when squashing the creature. Primarily throughout the Jacobean period —and occasionally used today— phrases about death are euphemisms for orgasm, the petite mort, or little death. Her action of killing the flea slightly changes the speaker's tone as it sparks a new rationale for his seduction: as you did not lose your life with the flea, you would not lose much if you surrender your virginity. Donne is applauded for his ability to establish the tone of necessity, particularly in The Flea.

The tone of the poem is, however, comical and the use of absurdity changes the meaning of the poem. The speakers' exaggerated way of expressing their request is largely influenced by John Donne's career as a lawyer. Donne is using satire in order to ridicule the ways lawyers argue. In the end, it is revealed that the speaker's sexual conquest does not prove to be successful because of the intentional flaws Donne uses in the speaker's argument.

== Typography ==
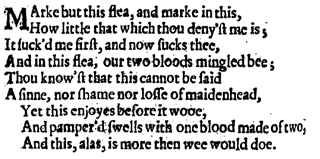

Typography is defined as the style or appearance of printed matter in order to give a certain effect to best convey meaning in a poem. During Donne's lifetime, it was standard to use the long s, which appears more like the letter 'f', and presents an ambiguity in the printed version of the poem. The third line, "It suck'd me first, and now sucks thee," would have been printed as "It ſuck'd me first, and now ſucks thee,", which could allude to exactly what the narrator thought the flea, and he himself wished, to be doing.

Scholars such as Andrew Keener suggest that Donne knew of this word for fornication because one of his contemporaries, John Florio, published a dictionary in 1598 that included the word fornication, which Donne is likely to have been familiar with.

== Metaphysical poetry ==
Donne was the most influential metaphysical poet. His personal relationship with religion and sexual relations seem to influence the majority of his work. The psychological analysis and sexual realism of his work are key to the development of poetic style. Nayeli Riano believes "The Flea" gives a new outlook to metaphysical poetry combining philosophical and spiritual approach that conveys an obscene word choice.

Metaphysical poetry, the natural that too is unnatural, is seldom direct and easy to decipher; making it intellectually stimulating to read. Donne's themes are explained through unusual metaphors turning the strangest idea into the depiction of the human experience.
