= Garrick Davis =

American poet and critic

Garrick Davis

Garrick Davis (born 1971 in Los Angeles) is an American poet and critic. He was Poetry Editor of First Things magazine from 2020 until 2021.

== Career ==
Davis is the founding editor of the Contemporary Poetry Review, the largest online archive of poetry criticism in the English-speaking world. His criticism appears regularly in the Contemporary Poetry Review.

Davis' work has also been published in the New Criterion, the Weekly Standard and Humanities magazine.

His poetry has appeared in a number of literary magazines including Verse, McSweeney’s, the Alabama Literary Review, and the New York Sun.

== Contemporary Poetry Review ==
The Contemporary Poetry Review, the largest online archive of poetry criticism in the English-speaking world, was founded in 1998, and was one of the earliest literary reviews in the United States to be published exclusively on the Internet. Regular contributors to the review have included a number of distinguished American poet-critics including Ernest Hilbert, David Yezzi, Adam Kirsch, Dillon Tracy, Jan Schreiber, Bill Coyle, and Joan Houlihan. Its regular foreign contributors include the Irish poet-critics Justin Quinn and David Wheatley, and the Indian critic Rabindra Swain. Ernest Hilbert edited the Contemporary Poetry Review, from 2005-2010.

== Books ==
=== Poetry ===
Terminal Diagrams (Ohio University Press/Swallow, 2010)

=== Anthologies ===
Child of the Ocmulgee: The Selected Poems of Freda Quenneville. Edited by Garrick Davis (Michigan State University Press, 2002)

Praising It New: The Best of the New Criticism. Edited by Garrick Davis (Ohio University Press, 2008)

== Personal life ==
Davis is married. He lives with his wife Emerald Robinson and son in the suburbs of Washington DC.
