= Timothy Murphy (poet) =

American poet

- Born: Timothy Iver Murphy; January 10, 1951; Hibbing, Minnesota, U.S.
- Died: June 30, 2018 (aged 67); Fargo, North Dakota, U.S.
- Occupations: Poet, businessman

Timothy Iver Murphy (January 10, 1951 – June 30, 2018) was an American poet and businessman. Reviewing Timothy Murphy's second collection in Contemporary Poetry Review in 2002, Paul Lake observed that "What Virgil was to the Italian peninsula and Homer to the Greek Mediterranean, Murphy is to the swatch of plains stretching from the Upper Midwest to the Rockies like a grassy inland sea."

== Life ==
Murphy was the son of Vincent and Katherine Bye Murphy. He was raised in Moorhead, Minnesota. Murphy was admitted to Yale University as an undergraduate. He was mentored there by Robert Penn Warren, the renowned poet and novelist. In 1972, he graduated with a B.A. degree and was designated Scholar of the House in Poetry. However, Warren declined to recommend Murphy for an academic position. Warren urged him instead to return to the "rich soil" of his rural roots. Murphy returned to Minnesota, where he joined his father in an insurance and estate planning business. He subsequently became involved in several farming and manufacturing enterprises in North Dakota. He died at the age of 67.

== Poetry ==
Murphy published his first collection of poetry, The Deed of Gift, in 1998; the collection represents all of Murphy's work as a poet through about 1996. In a contemporary review of the volume, Gerry Cambridge summarized Murphy's accomplishment: "There are outstanding poems here, including 'Harvest of Sorrows', 'Sunset at the Getty', and 'The Quarrel', as well as a great number of very likeable, individual, and tautly-made pieces. It would be hard to confuse Murphy with any other contemporary poet. No one else writing poetry in English sounds quite like him." As poet Dick Davis has noted, this distinctive style owes much to Murphy's use of traditional meter and rhyme, unusual among poets today: "His poems are wholly his own, and yet the voice in them lives in and through his mastery of traditional metre, which is so thorough as to seem indivisible from the poems' sensibility and meaning." This focus on rhyme and meter is exemplified in the following excerpt from "Harvest of Sorrows":

When swift brown swallows
return to their burrows
and diamond willows
leaf in the hollows,
when barrows wallow
and brood sows farrow,
we sow the black furrows
behind our green harrows.

— excerpt from "Harvest of Sorrows"

In a 2001 interview, Murphy cited C.P. Cavafy and Homer as influences, noting that they, like himself, were gay. In 2011, The Dakota Institute published two collections of Murphy's poetry, Mortal Stakes and Faint Thunder and Hunter's Log. Murphy joked in an interview that year that "I've got more inventory than Ford Motor Co." After 2011, Murphy's poetry has been published by The North Dakota State University Press. Devotions (2017) is a substantial (160-page) collection that gathers poems from his return to the Catholic Church after 2005. Dana Gioia concludes his introduction: "These are genuine poems rooted in a passionate encounter with the divine. I predict they will find many devoted readers." In 2019, Hunter's Log: Volumes II & III appeared posthumously.

== Bibliography ==
- Murphy, Timothy (1998). The Deed of Gift. Introduction by Richard Wilbur. Ashland, Oregon: Story Line Press. ISBN 1-885266-62-6. A collection of Murphy's poetry.
- Murphy, Timothy (2000). Set the Ploughshare Deep: A Prairie Memoir. Woodcuts by Charles Beck. Athens, Ohio: Ohio University Press. ISBN 978-0-8214-1321-0. Reviewed by David Solheim.
- Murphy, Timothy (2002). Very Far North. Introduction by Anthony Hecht. Ewell, Surrey: Waywiser Press. ISBN 1-904130-01-1. Murphy's second collection of poetry.
- Sullivan, Alan; Murphy, Timothy (2004). Anderson, Sarah (ed.). Beowulf. Longman Press. ISBN 0-321-10720-9. Verse translation of Beowulf. Alan Sullivan (1948–2010) was Murphy's partner.
- Murphy, Timothy (August 15, 2011). Mortal Stakes and Faint Thunder. The Dakota Institute. ISBN 978-0982559772.
- Murphy, Timothy (October 1, 2011). Hunter's Log. Original art by Eldridge Hardie. The Dakota Institute. ISBN 978-0982559796.
- Murphy, Timothy (2017). Devotions. Dana Gioia (preface). North Dakota State University. ISBN 9780911042917. OCLC 968175524.
- Murphy, Timothy (2019). Hunter's Log: Volumes II & III. Suzanne Kelley (editor), Eldridge Hardie (artwork), Stephen Bodio (forward). North Dakota State University Press. ISBN 9781946163080. OCLC 1083715384.
