= Evansville Review =

- Editors in Chief: Amanda Alexander and Sari Baum
- Categories: Poetry magazine
- Frequency: Annual
- Format: Print
- Publisher: University of Evansville Creative Writing Department
- Founded: 1989
- Country: United States
- Based in: Evansville, Indiana, U.S.
- Language: English
- Website: http://evansvillereview.evansville.edu/
- OCLC: 38078607

The Evansville Review is a literary journal published annually by the University of Evansville. Content includes poetry, fiction, nonfiction, plays, and interviews by the students. It was founded in 1989. Notable past contributors include Joyce Carol Oates, Arthur Miller, John Updike, Joseph Brodsky, and Shirley Ann Grau, among others. Poems that first appeared in the Evansville Review have been included in the Best American Poetry and Pushcart Prize anthologies.

== See also ==
- Willis Barnstone Translation Prize
