= R. S. Gwynn =

American poet

Robert Samuel Gwynn
- Born: May 13, 1948 (age 78); Eden, North Carolina, United States
- Education: Davidson College B.A. University of Arkansas M.A.
- Occupation: Poet
- Spouse: Donna (m. 1977)
- Children: 3

Robert Samuel "Sam" Gwynn (born 1948, Eden, North Carolina) is an American poet and anthologist associated with New Formalism.

== Life ==
Gwynn is married and lives in Beaumont, Texas. He graduated from Davidson College in 1969, where he won the Vereen Bell Award for creative writing twice, played varsity football, and was a member of the school's championship team on the General Electric College Bowl. He did graduate work at Middlebury College's Bread Loaf School of English and later earned an M.A. and an M.F.A. from the University of Arkansas.

== Poetry and career ==
Gwynn's first full-length book, The Drive-in, won the Breakthrough Award of the University of Missouri Press in 1986. He has received the Michael Braude Award for Light Verse of the American Academy of Arts and Letters, served as an original faculty member of the West Chester University Conference on Form and Narrative in Poetry, and was included in the first significant anthology of New Formalism, Rebel Angels: Twenty-five Poets of the New Formalism (Story Line Press 1995). In 1997, Gwynn was selected as a university professor at Lamar University, and he has been honored by Phi Kappa Phi. In September, 2015, he was appointed Program Director of the West Chester University Poetry Conference.

== Critical reception ==
In his introduction to Gwynn's volume No Word of Farewell: Poems 1970-2000, Dana Gioia, poet and former chair of the National Endowment for the Arts, wrote, "[Gwynn] is ingeniously funny...[and] an effortless master of verse forms. No American poet of his generation has written better sonnets, and very few can equal him in the ballade, couplet, rondeau, or pantoum–not to mention the half dozen new forms he has invented"; further, according to Gioia, "Gwynn juxtaposes styles and subjects not customarily seen together–mythic and modish images phrased in language alternatively sublime and debased–but told with such force of imagination and assured musicality that the resulting poems seem not idiosyncratic but inevitable."

A collection of Gwynn's papers is housed at Texas State University at San Marcos in the Southwestern Writers Collection. A link to this collection can be found on T.A.R.O. (Texas Archival Resources Online.)

== Works ==
- Bearing & Distance, Cedar Rock Press 1977
- The Narcissiad, Cedar Rock Press, 1981, ISBN 978-0-930024-16-1
- The Drive-in, University of Missouri Press, 1986, ISBN 978-0-8262-0602-2
- No Word of Farewell: Poems 1970-2000, Story Line Press, 2001, ISBN 978-1-885266-91-0
- Dogwatch, Measure Press, 2014, ISBN 978-1-939574-07-7
- Billy Collins; David Lehman, eds. (2006). "Sects from A to Z". The Best American Poetry, 2006. Simon and Schuster. ISBN 978-0-7432-2967-8.

=== Editor ===
- R. S. Gwynn, ed. (1996). The Advocates of Poetry: A Reader of American Poet-Critics of the Modernist Era. University of Arkansas Press. ISBN 978-1-55728-426-6.
- Contemporary American Poetry: A Pocket Anthology, Pearson/Longman, 2005. ISBN 978-0-321-18282-1
