= Able Muse =

American literary magazine

- Editor: Alexander Pepple
- Categories: Literary magazine
- Frequency: Semiannual
- Publisher: Able Muse Review
- First issue: 1999
- Country: United States
- Based in: San Jose, California
- Language: English
- Website: ablemuse.com
- ISSN: 2168-0426 (print); 1528-3798 (web)

Able Muse is a literary magazine established in 1999 by editor-in-chief Alexander Pepple in San Jose, California. It started as an online publication, publishing poems, short stories, essays, book reviews, art, and photography from authors worldwide. It includes the sister organizations of Eratosphere, an online workshop forum for poetry, fiction and art; and Able Muse Press, a small press that publishes poetry and fiction collections by established and emerging authors.

== History ==
The magazine transitioned into a print publication with the tenth issue, the Winter 2010 Inaugural Print Edition, accompanied with the publication of the Able Muse Anthology, edited by Pepple with a foreword by Timothy Steele. The magazine still maintains its online presence where it simultaneously releases a digital edition that mirrors the corresponding issue of the print edition. Able Muse has been edited, since its inception by Alexander Pepple.

== Awards ==
The magazine hosts a series of annual awards designed to bring recognition to emerging poets and writers or enhance the prestige of established authors. Poets compete, with a handful of their best poems, in the Able Muse Write Prize for Poetry, and writers compete with a couple of their best flash fiction pieces in the Able Muse Write Prize for Fiction.

== Able Muse Press ==
Able Muse Press is a sister organization of Able Muse, founded in 2010 by Alexander Pepple, who is also the press' editor and publisher. This was at about the same time the print edition of Able Muse was launched.

== See also ==
- List of literary magazines
