= Dana Gioia =

American poet and writer (born 1950)

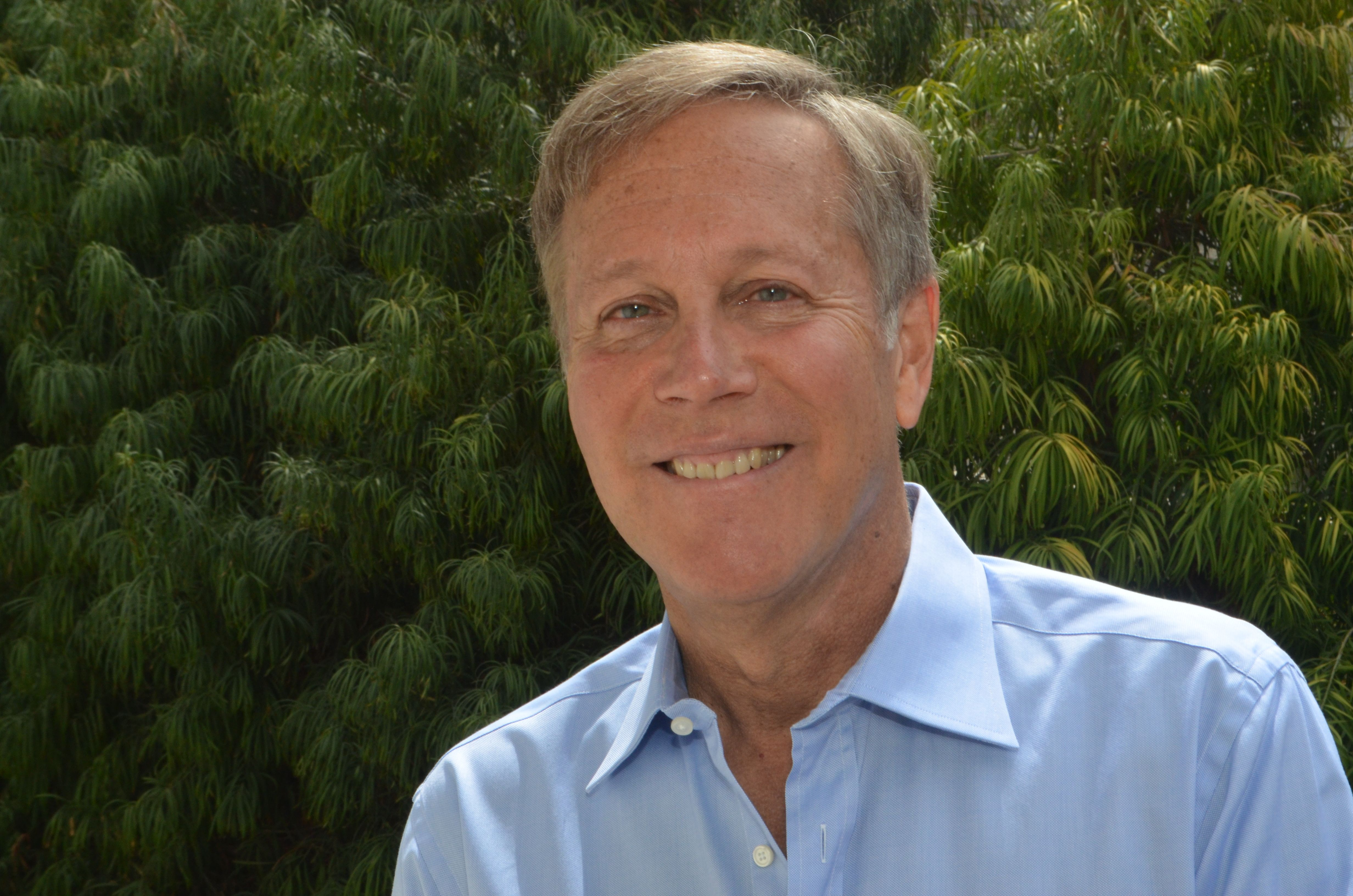
- Gioia in 2015
- Born: December 24, 1950 (age 75); Hawthorne, California, U.S.
- Education: Stanford University (BA, MBA); Harvard University (MA)
- Relatives: Ted Gioia (brother)
- Writing career
- Genre: Poetry
- Notable awards: American Book Award (2002); Presidential Citizens Medal (2008); Laetare Medal (2010)
- Website: danagioia.com

Michael Dana Gioia (/ˈdʒɔɪ.ə/; born December 24, 1950) is an American poet, literary critic, literary translator, and essayist.

Since the early 1980s, Gioia has been considered part of the controversial literary movements in American poetry known as New Formalism, which advocates the continued writing of poetry in rhyme and meter, and New Narrative, which advocates the telling of non-autobiographical stories. At the request of U.S. President George W. Bush, Gioia served between 2003 and 2009 as the chairman of the National Endowment for the Arts (NEA). In November 2006, Business Week magazine profiled Gioia as "The Man Who Saved the NEA". Five years after Gioia left office, The Washington Post referred to him as one of "two of the NEA's strongest leaders".

In December 2015, Gioia became the California State Poet Laureate. Gioia has published six books of poetry and five volumes of literary criticism as well as opera libretti, song cycles, translations, and over two dozen literary anthologies. Gioia's poetry has been anthologized in The Norton Anthology of Poetry and The Oxford Book of American Poetry. Gioia published translations of poets Eugenio Montale and Seneca the Younger.

== Early life and education ==
Gioia was born in Los Angeles in 1950, the child of a working-class Sicilian father, who drove a taxi, and a Mexican-American mother, who worked as a telephone operator. He attended Catholic schools for twelve years, graduating from Serra High School in Gardena, California. In high school, he dreamt of becoming a music composer.

Gioia attended Stanford University, the first person in his family to attend college. He received a BA from Stanford. followed by an M.A. in comparative literature from Harvard University, where he studied with the poets Elizabeth Bishop and Robert Fitzgerald. He then returned to Stanford where he received an MBA.

== Career ==
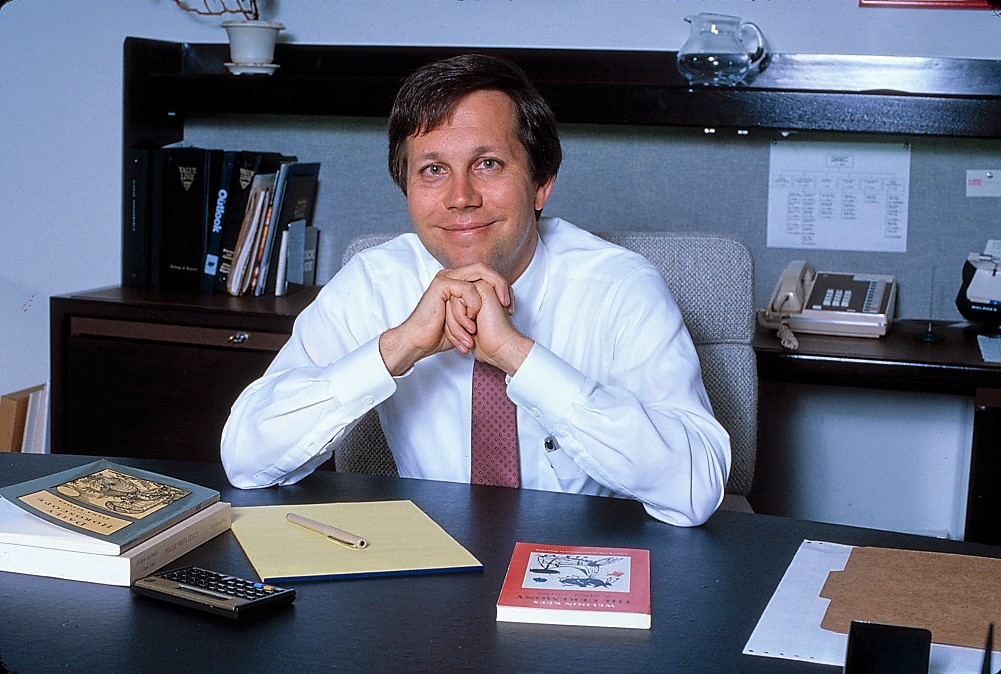
Gioia in 1986 at General Foods

For fifteen years, Gioia worked as a businessman in New York while writing at night and on weekends. Among his jobs was serving as a vice president at General Foods, where he marketed Kool Aid. In 1992, he left the corporate world to pursue a writing career.

In 2002, Gioia was nominated as Chair of the National Endowment for the Arts by U.S. President George W. Bush. With support from both Democrats and Republicans in the U.S. House of Representatives, Gioia gained a $20.1 million increase in his agency's budget and for the remainder of his tenure, silenced requests from conservative Republicans to abolish the NEA. In November 2006, Business Week magazine profiled Gioia as "The Man Who Saved the NEA". While Chair, Gioia created several national initiatives each around a specific art. "We have a generation of Americans growing up who have never been to the theater, the symphony, opera, dance, who have never heard fine jazz, and who increasingly don't read," said Gioia. The New York Times columnist William Safire referred to Gioia's NEA national initiatives as "A Gioia to Behold". His program "Shakespeare in American Communities" gave grants to more than 40 American theatre companies to tour small and medium-sized communities. His program The Big Read aimed to increase literacy across America. It was launched as a pilot program with ten communities in 2006, and went national in 2007, eventually becoming the largest literary program in the history of the federal government.

In 2006, Gioia created Poetry Out Loud, a national poetry recitation contest for students. Gioia expanded his "Shakespeare in American Communities" program to include tours to military bases. The NEA also sent young artist programs from opera companies around the country to military bases with the Great American Voices Military Base Tour.

Gioia stepped down from the NEA in January 2009 to return to poetry. Five years after Gioia left office, The Washington Post referred to him as one of "two of the NEA's strongest leaders".

Gioia has been a visiting professor at Johns Hopkins, Sarah Lawrence, Wesleyan, Mercer University, and Colorado College. For nine years he taught literature and music at the University of Southern California as the Judge Widney Professor of Poetry and Public Culture. He quit in 2019.

In 2015, Gioia was appointed by Governor Jerry Brown as the Poet Laureate of California. During his four years in office, Gioia became the first state laureate to visit all 58 counties in California. Focusing on small and mid-sized communities, he participated in over 100 events with local writers and students. His travels became the subject of a BBC Radio 3 documentary.

== Poetry ==
Gioia has published six full-length volumes of poetry in addition to many smaller fine-press books and pamphlets. Although Gioia is best known for helping revive rhyme and meter, all of his books contain a mix of poems in free and formal verse. His first collection, Daily Horoscope (1986), attracted much notice, favorable and unfavorably, because of its use of rhyme, meter and verse narrative, but its most widely reprinted poem, “California Hills in August,” is in free verse.

The Gods of Winter (1991), Gioia’s second collection, contains poems written after the death of his first son. Published in the U.S. and U.K, the British edition was chosen by the Poetry Book Society as their main selection.

Gioia’s third collection, Interrogations at Noon (2001), was the winner of the 2002 American Book Award. The book contains both original poems and translations. Pity the Beautiful (2012) marked Gioia’s return to poetry after his time and the NEA and included two chilling poems, “Special Treatments Ward,” which describes a terminal ward in a children’s hospital, and “Haunted,” a dramatic monologue in equal parts of a love story and a ghost story. “Haunted” was turned into a ballet-opera by composer Paul Salerni.

Gioia’s next volume, 99 Poems: New & Selected (2016), surveys his career in an unusual way. Rather than present his poems chronologically, Gioia arranges them by seven themes. The book won the Poets’ Prize. Gioia's most recent collection of poems is Meet Me at the Lighthouse, published in 2023. It pays special attention to his Mexican roots and includes “The Ballad of Jesus Ortiz,” which recounts the life and death of this great-grandfather, a vaquero who was killed in a racially motivated incident.

=== Criticism and beliefs about poetry ===
In a 2016 interview, Gioia recalled, "As soon as I began publishing formal poems, my work was attacked." In response, he decided, "to articulate my poetics", by publishing literary essays.

Gioia wrote the 1983 essay Business and Poetry, in which he pointed out how many other well-known figures in American poetry, including Wallace Stevens, T. S. Eliot, and William Carlos Williams, had also made their livings outside of the academy. In his 1987 essay Notes on the New Formalism, Gioia wrote: "There will always be groups advocating new types of poetry, some of it genuine, just as there will always be conservative opposing forces trying to maintain the conventional methods. But the revival of rhyme and meter among some young poets creates an unprecedented situation in American poetry. The New Formalists put the free-verse poets in the ironic and unprepared position of being the status quo. Free verse, the creation of an older literary revolution, is now the long-established, ruling orthodoxy, formal poetry the unexpected challenge... Obviously, for many writers the discussion between formal and free-verse has become an encoded political debate."

In a 2016 interview with John Cusatis, however, Gioia explained, "Literary movements are always temporary. They last a decade or so, and then they die or merge into the mainstream. The best New Formalist poets gradually became mainstream figures. There was no climax to the so-called Poetry Wars, only slow assimilation and change. Free and formal verse gradually ceased to be considered polar opposites. Form became one of the available styles of contemporary practice."

In 1991, Gioia published the essay, Can Poetry Matter? in the April issue of Atlantic Monthly. In the essay, Gioia began with the words, "American poetry now belongs to a subculture. No longer part of the mainstream of artistic and intellectual life, it has become the specialized occupation of a relatively small and isolated group. Little of the frenetic activity it generates ever reaches outside that closed group. As a class, poets are not without cultural status. Like priests in a town of agnostics, they still command a certain residual prestige. But as individual artists, they are almost invisible." Gioia argued that American poetry had become imprisoned in college and university creative writing programs and as a result, was no longer being read or studied by the vast majority of the American people. Gioia concluded with the words, "It is time to experiment, time to leave the well-ordered but stuffy classroom, time to restore a vulgar vitality to poetry and unleash the energy now trapped in the subculture. There is nothing to lose. Society has already told us that poetry is dead. Let's build a funeral pyre out of the desiccated conventions piled around us and watch the unkillable Phoenix rise from the ashes."

Writing in 2002, Gioia recalled, "When the original essay appeared in the April 1991 issue of Atlantic Monthly, the editors warned me to expect angry letters from interested parties. When the hate mail arrived typed on the letterheads of University writing programs, no one was surprised. What astonished the Atlantic editors, however, was the sheer size and intensity of the response. Can Poetry Matter? eventually generated more mail than any article the Atlantic had published in decades."

=== Music and opera ===
Gioia has written five opera libretti. His first opera, Nosferatu, with music by Alva Henderson, was jointly premiered by Rimrock Opera and Opera Idaho in 2004. His second libretto, Tony Caruso's Final Broadcast, with music by Paul Salerni, won the National Opera Association award for best new chamber opera and was premiered in Los Angeles in 2008. Both of these works have been recorded. His opera, The Three Feathers, with music by Lori Laitman, was premiered by Virginia Tech and Opera Roanoke in 2014. His one-act opera for children, Maya and the Magic Ring, was produced by the Lyric Opera of Kansas City in 2025.

== Honors and awards ==
- National Book Critics Circle, Finalist in Criticism (1992)
- Denise Levertov Award in Poetry, Image Journal (2016)
- Walt Whitman Champion of Literacy Award (2017)

== Personal life ==
On February 23, 1980, Gioia married Mary Elizabeth Hiecke. The couple met while they were graduate students at Stanford. They had three sons, one of whom died in infancy. His poem "Planting a Sequoia" is based on his experience of losing his infant son.

He is the older brother of jazz critic and music historian Ted Gioia.

== Selected publications ==
=== Poetry ===
- Daily Horoscope (1986)
- The Gods of Winter (1991)
- Interrogations at Noon (2001)
- Pity the Beautiful (2012)
- 99 Poems: New & Selected (2016)
- Meet Me at the Lighthouse (2023)

=== Criticism and nonfiction ===
- Can Poetry Matter? (1991)
- Barrier of a Common Language: An American Looks at Contemporary British Poetry (Poets on Poetry) (2003)
- Disappearing Ink: Poetry at the End of Print Culture (2004)
- The Catholic Writer Today: And Other Essays (2019)
- Studying with Miss Bishop: Memoirs from a Young Writer's Life (2021)
- Weep, Shudder, Die: On Opera and Poetry (2024)
- Poetry as Enchantment (2024)

=== Translation ===
- Eugenio Montale's Motteti: Poems of Love (1990)
- The Madness of Hercules (Hercules Furens) (2023)

=== Opera libretti ===
- Nosferatu (2001)
- Tony Caruso's Last Broadcast (2005)
- The Three Feathers (2014)
- Haunted (2019)

=== Edited ===
- The Ceremony and Other Stories by Weldon Kees (editor) (1984)
- Poems from Italy (editor, with William Jay Smith) (1985)
- New Italian Poets (editor, with Michael Palma) (1991)
- Certain Solitudes: On the Poetry of Donald Justice (editor, with William Logan) (1998)
- California Poetry: From the Gold Rush to the Present (California Legacy) (editor, with Chryss Yost and Jack Hicks) (2003)
- The Misread City: New Literary Los Angeles (editor, with Scott Timberg) (2003)
- Twentieth-Century American Poetry (editor, with David Mason and Meg Schoerke) (2004)
- "The Art of the Short Story" (editor, with R. S. Gwynn) (2006)
- An Introduction to Poetry, 13th edition (editor, with X.J. Kennedy) (2010)
- An Introduction to Fiction, 11th edition (editor, with X.J. Kennedy) (2010)
- Best American Poetry, 2018 (editor) (2018)

== Writings about Dana Gioia and his work ==
- Matthew Brennan. Dana Gioia. A Critical Introduction. (Story Line Press Critical Monographs) (2012, expanded and revised 2020) Franciscan University Press.
- April Lindner. Dana Gioia (Boise State University Western Writers Series, No. 143) (2003)
- Jack W. C. Hagstrom and Bill Morgan. Dana Gioia: A Descriptive Bibliography with Critical Essays (2002)
- Janet McCann, "Dana Gioia: A Contemporary Metaphysics", Renascence 61.3 (Spring 2009): 193–205.
- Michael Peich. Dana Gioia and Fine Press Printing (Kelly/Winterton Press) (2000)
- John Zheng (editor). Conversations with Dana Gioia. University of Mississippi Press (2021).
- Zheng, John and Jon Parrish Peede, eds. 2024. Dana Gioia: Poet and Critic. Macon, GA: Mercer University Press.

== See also ==
- Nosferatu
- American poetry
