= Jože Šerjak =

Slovene writer and poet (1918–1945)

- Born: June 8, 1918; Trata pri Velesovem, Kingdom of Yugoslavia
- Died: 1945; Teharje camp
- Occupation(s): Writer and poet

Jože Šerjak (June 8, 1918 – 1945) was a Slovene writer and poet and a member of the Salesian order.

== Life ==
Šerjak was born as the last of four children into a family of the farmer Janez Šerjak and farmer Katarina (née Maček) in Trata pri Velesovem. Three weeks before his birth, his father died suddenly and unexpectedly. Thus, his mother had a great influence on his upbringing and life direction. He attended elementary school (1925–1929) in Velesovo. At the initiative of his local pastor, Father Bešar, he then enrolled in the classical eight-year secondary school in Ljubljana, during which time he lived in Our Lady's Student Dormitory (Slovene: Marijanišče). After two years (1929–1931) he was no longer able to pay the monthly tuition at the institution, and so he had to return home and work on family farm. Because he wanted to be able to continue his education, he sought other opportunities to do so. With the help of his sister, who had joined the Daughters of Charity of Saint Vincent de Paul, he learned about the Salesians and the possibility of older students attending their secondary school.

In the fall of 1933, Šerjak resumed his education with the Salesians in Veržej. At the same time, he took exams at the eight-year secondary school in Maribor. Although he was already older, he joined the group and performed in the institute's orchestra, where he played the violin and prepared talks for various ceremonies. After finishing the fifth year of the program, he entered his novitiate at Radna near Sevnica in August 1937 and became a member of the Salesian order the following year. He attended the upper years of secondary school in Radna. After moved to the Salesians' facility in Ljubljana's Rakovnik neighborhood in 1940, he completed the eighth year of secondary school in Ljubljana. After high school, he first pursued Slavic studies at the University of Ljubljana's Faculty of Arts, but in 1943 he transferred to the Faculty of Theology. He was mobilized in 1944. He was first sent to the Home Guard post in Šmarje, and then he was transferred to the Home Guard post in Pijava Gorica. Both outposts are in the immediate vicinity of Gorenje Blato, the birthplace of his father Janez. At the end of the war, in May 1945, he retreated with other Home Guard members to Carinthia, from where he was returned from the camp at Viktring by the British and handed over to Yugoslavia. He was last sighted at the Teharje camp, where he was presumably murdered.

== Work ==
Already while living at home, and especially during school, Šerjak showed displayed creative talent, which he developed through study and training. He probably already started writing at Radna, and, after arriving in Ljubljana in 1940, he became very active in the Salesian students' newsletter Naše delo, became a contributor to religious newsletters, and prepared Marian and other ceremonies. His poems became popular, and other students learned them by heart and repeated them like a prayer. This was especially true for his poem "Molitev" (Prayer). In his crown of sonnets "Mami v lep spomin" (In Fond Memory of My Mother) he poured out his love for his hometown, his mother, and all his family, and he expressed his desire to become a priest. It also foreshadowed his approaching end.

Šerjak's crown of sonnets, preserved in manuscript form, expresses his mentality and relation towards his surroundings. It was written at a milestone in his life, when the spring of his life turned into summer. With his violent death, the plans he had for his future work died. Šerjak had wanted to write a novel about the ancient pilgrimage site and monastery at Velesovo, to write literature for young people, and to serve as a priest.

== Works ==
- Zlate zgodbice (1944)
- "Pot, resnica in življenje" (Bogoljub, April 1944, p. 59)
- Contributions to Naše delo (1940–1944)
- Contributions to Salezijanski vestnik (1940–1944)
- "Romarji s Kureščka" (Slovensko domobranstvo, September 1944, pp. 11, 12)
