= David Stephenson =

David Stephenson may refer to:

- David Stephenson (rugby league, born 1958) (1958–2022), rugby league player for Warrington & Great Britain
- David Stephenson (rugby league, born 1972), English rugby league player for Oldham, Hull & Rochdale
- David Stephenson (climatologist), British academic at the University of Exeter
- David Stephenson (poet) (born 1959), American poet
- D. C. Stephenson (1891–1966), Grand Dragon of the Ku Klux Klan in Indiana in the 1920s
- David Stephenson (architect) (1757–1819), English architect who worked in Newcastle upon Tyne and Northumberland
- David Stephenson (photographer) (born 1955), American–Australian photographer

== See also ==
- David Stevenson (disambiguation)
