= Trata =

Trata may refer to:

Places in Slovenia:

- Trata (Kočevje), a neighborhood of the town of Kočevje in the Municipality of Kočevje
- Trata (Ljubljana), a former settlement in the City Municipality of Ljubljana
- Trata (Prapetno Brdo), a hamlet of Prapetno Brdo in the municipality of Tolmin
- Trata pri Velesovem, a village in the Municipality of Cerklje na Gorenjskem
- Trata, Škofja Loka, a settlement in the Municipality of Škofja Loka
- Spodnja Trata, a hamlet of Zalog pri Cerkljah in the Municipality of Cerklje na Gorenjskem
- Zgornja Trata, a hamlet of Zalog pri Cerkljah in the Municipality of Cerklje na Gorenjskem

Other:

- Trata (dance), a traditional Greek dance
