= Wom-Po =

Listserv

The Discussion of Women's Poetry List-serv, known as Wom-Po, WOM-PO or WOMPO, is an international listserv devoted to the discussion of poetry by women. Wom-Po was started in December 1997 by poet Annie Finch. After being housed at Miami University, University of Southern Maine, and Nassau Community College, the listserv is currently housed on Google Groups. The majority of members are poets from the United States, the U.K. Australia, and New Zealand. Discussion on the listserv has sparked numerous conference panels, poetry readings, poetic collaborations, spin-off listservs such as the Mom-Po list, journal publications such as a collaborative Crown of sonnets published in Prairie Schooner in 2007, and an anthology, Letters to the World: Poems from the Wom-Po Listserv, published in 2008 by Red Hen Press.

== History ==
In a 2016 interview, Finch describes the founding of WOM-PO as a response to the silencing of women on other poetry listservs, Contemporary American Poetry List and POETICS list, in 1997. Finch says that "on December 18 I got so desperate that, pretty much on the spur of the moment, I got permission to use the Miami University server and started WOM-PO with an email to a few friends . . . and some women I didn’t know but had noticed trying in vain to have their intelligent comments heard on the male-dominated listservs." Among the first few subscribers were Wendy Battin, Catherine Daly, Marilyn Hacker, Farideh Hasanzadeh, Allison Joseph, Rachel Loden, Gwyn McVay, Marilyn Nelson, Judith Roitman, Susan Schultz, Kathrine Varnes, and Elizabeth Waldner. Finch was a "very active, very hands on facilitator during the formative years of building the culture of the listserv, for probably the first five or six years." One early challenge was the question of whether to allow men on the listserv, which was settled, after extensive discussion, through consensus with a "yes." The listserv moved with Finch from Miami University to University of Southern Maine in 2004, and Finch asked poet Amy King to take it over in 2008. Several years later, King passed it to Christina M. Rau. The twentieth anniversary of WOM-PO was marked on May 22, 2018 with a panel at the [Poetry by the Sea] conference. Moderated by list facilitator Amy King, the panel included Barbara Crooker, Annie Finch (list founder) and Allison Joseph, with many wom-pos also in the audience.

== Members ==
Some notable members of Wom-Po have included poets Sandra Beasley, Margo Berdeshevsky, Chana Bloch, Allison Hedge Coke, Martha Collins, Sharon Doubiago, Annie Finch, Ann Fisher-Wirth, Daisy Fried, Kate Gale, Daniela Gioseffi, Arielle Greenberg, Gabriel Gudding, R. S. Gwynn, Allison Joseph, Marilyn Hacker, Farideh Hassanzadeh, Eloise Klein Healy, Julie Kane, Amy King, Ursula K. Le Guin, Jeffrey Levine, Marilyn Nelson, Mendi Obadike, Alicia Ostriker, Katha Pollitt, Molly Peacock, Mira Rosenthal, Metta Sama, Rati Saxena, Susan M. Schultz, Peggy Shumaker, Evie Shockley, Ron Silliman, Patricia Smith, Stephanie Strickland, Lesley Wheeler, and Rachel Zucker.

== Culture ==
Wom-Po is a close community with distinctive longstanding traditions such as referring to members playfully as "womponies" and an annual Friday breakfast at the Associated Writers Program conference. Several volunteer-run weekly newsletters keep the list free of self-promotional and congratulatory posts so that discussion can focus on poetry.
