= Annie Finch =

American poet (born 1956)

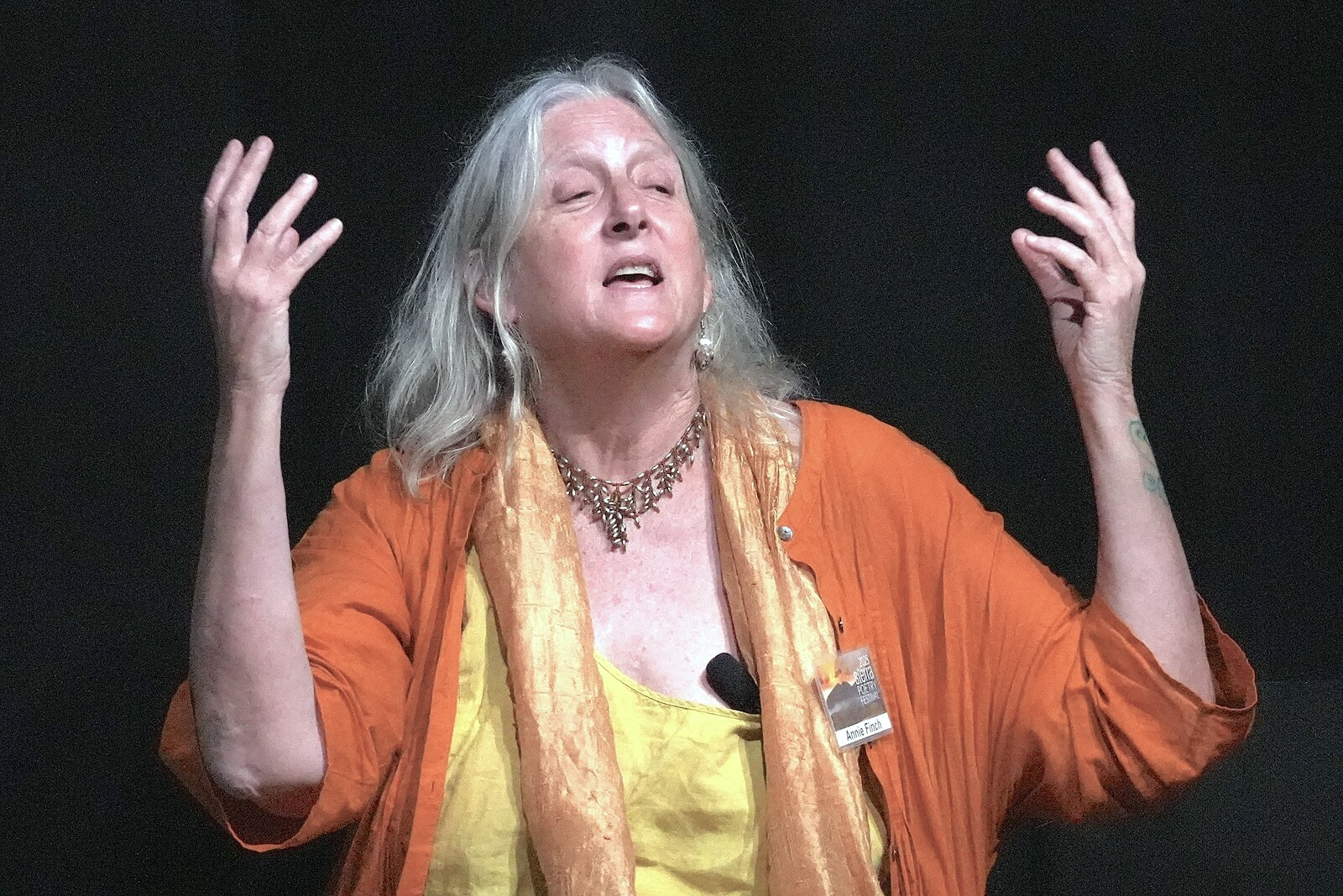
- Finch reciting poetry at the Sierra Poetry Festival 2025
- Born: Annie Ridley Crane Finch; October 31, 1956 (age 69); New Rochelle, New York, U.S.
- Education: Yale University (B.A.), University of Houston (M.A.), Stanford University (Ph.D.)
- Occupations: Poet, writer, editor, critic, playwright, librettist, performance artist
- Writing career
- Language: English
- Genres: Poetry, verse drama, essay, memoir, poetics, poetry translation
- Subjects: Feminism, spirituality, abortion
- Notable works: Calendars(2003), Among the Goddesses(2010), Spells: New and Selected Poems(2013), Choice Words: Writers on Abortion(2020)
- Notable awards: Sarasvati Award, Robert Fitzgerald Award, Yale Younger Poets Finalist, National Poetry Series Finalist, Foreword Poetry Book of the Year Shortlist
- Movements: Feminist poetry, New Formalism, Speculative poetry
- Website: AnnieFinch.com

Annie Finch (born October 31, 1956) is an American poet, critic, editor, translator, playwright, and performer. Her poetry is known for its often incantatory use of rhythm, meter, and poetic form and for its themes of feminism and earth-based spirituality. Her books includeSpells: New and Selected Poems, The Body of Poetry: Essays on Women, Form, and the Poetic Self, A Poet's Craft, Calendars, and Among the Goddesses.

== Early life and education ==
Annie Ridley Crane Finch was born in New Rochelle, New York, on October 31, 1956. Her mother was poet and doll artist Margaret Rockwell Finch and her father, Henry Leroy Finch Jr., was a pacifist leader and a scholar of philosophy whose works include three books on Ludwig Wittgenstein. Her great-aunt was the economist, politician, pacifist, and writer Jessie Wallace Hughan. Finch began writing poetry as a child. She was educated in public schools, then for two years at Oakwood Friends School and one year at Simon's Rock College, where she studied filmmaking and art history. At Yale University she studied poetry, anthropology, the history of the English language with Marie Borroff, and Versification with Penelope Laurans, graduating magna cum laude in 1979. After traveling in Africa with painter Alix Bacon, in the early eighties she settled in New York's East Village, where she worked at Natural History Magazine and self-published and performed the rhythmical experimental longpoemThe Encyclopedia of Scotland. In 1984, Finch encountered the work of Ntozake Shange in a bookstore and "recognized in her a soul-mother, someone else for whom poetry was performative, sacred, curative, indispensable, physical." She immediately applied to the University of Houston, where Shange was teaching, and earned her M.A. in creative writing there in 1985 with a thesis in Verse Drama directed by Shange. Finch earned a Ph.D in English and American Literature from Stanford University in 1990, studying feminist theory with Adrienne Rich and pursuing a self-designed concentration in Versification under the supervision of Diane Middlebrook.

== Poetic career ==
Finch's first poetry collection, Eve (Story Line Press, 1997), was a finalist for the National Poetry Series and the Yale Series of Younger Poets. Calendars (Tupelo Press, 2003), finalist for the National Poetry Series and shortlisted for the Forward Poetry Book of the Year award, is structured around a series of poems written for performance to celebrate the Wheel of the Year. Her third book, Among the Goddesses: An Epic Libretto in Seven Dreams (Red Hen Press, 2010), which received the Sarasvati Award for Poetry, is a hybrid work combining narrative and dramatic structure to tell a mythic story about abortion. The Encyclopedia of Scotland was published in 2010 by Salt Publishing in the U.K.; in the same year, Carnegie Mellon University Press reissued Eve in the Contemporary Classics Poetry Series. Spells: New and Selected Poems (Wesleyan University Press, 2012), collects poems from each of Finch's previous books along with previously unpublished poems. The Poetry Witch Little Book of Spells (2019), also from Wesleyan University Press, offers small spells of fewer than eight lines, gathered by Finch from the longer poems of Spells.

Finch's poems are collected in anthologies including the Academy of American Poets Poem-a-Day, Penguin Book of The Sonnet, Norton Anthology of World Poetry, and Penguin Book of Twentieth-Century American Poetry. Her poems for public occasions include a Phi Beta Kappa poem for Yale University and the memorial poem for the September 11 attacks installed in New York's Cathedral of St. John the Divine (accompanying the commemorative sculpture by Meredith Bergmann). She has written that she believes it is part of her calling as a poet to compose occasional poetry on topics of personal and cultural importance.

== Critical reception ==
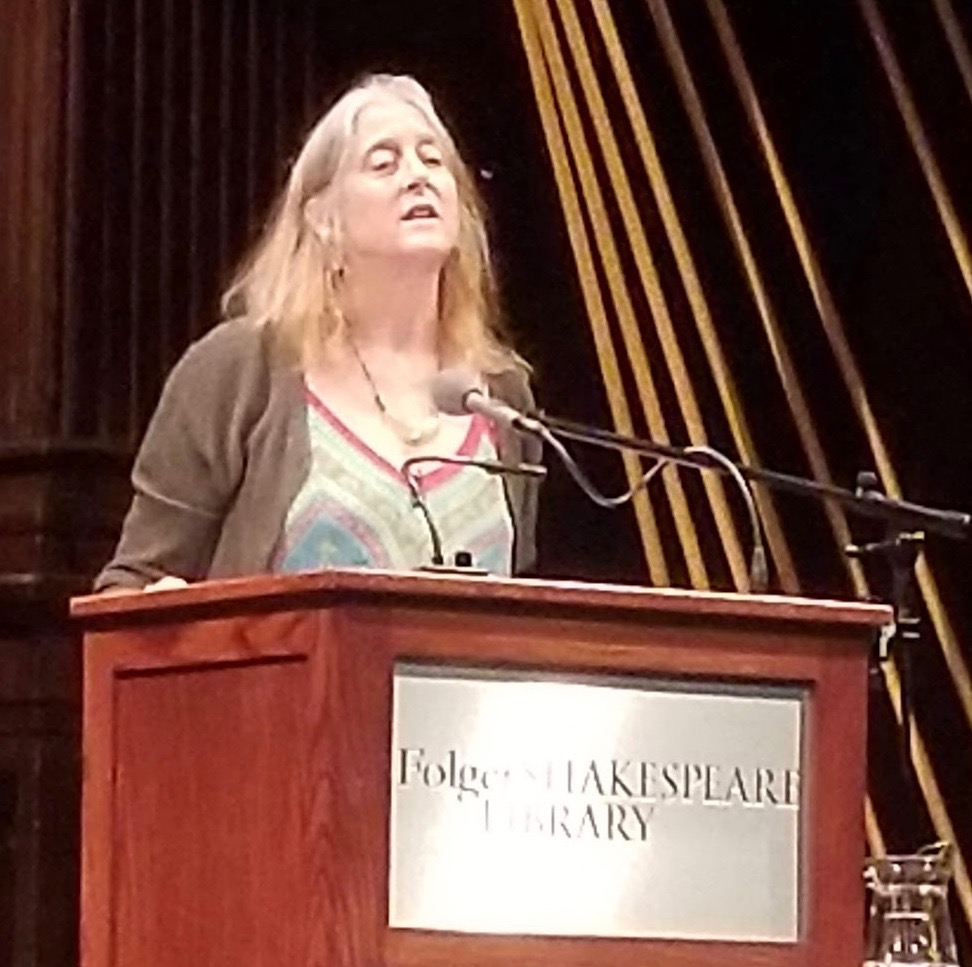
Finch reading at Folger Theatre, Washington, DC, 2019

Finch's dedication to writing in meter and her role as a scholar, editor, and critic of poetic form led some reviewers of her first books to classify her poetry within the movement known as New Formalism. Dictionary of Literary Biography named her "one of the central figures in contemporary American poetry" for her role in the reclamation of poetic form. But reviewers soon noticed key differences between Finch's poetry and that of other new formalist poets. Henry Taylor, for example, claimed that Finch was not a typical new formalist because she did not focus on the realities of contemporary life, and C.L. Rawlins emphasized the incantatory use of form in Eve, writing, "Finch is a poet in her bones . . . . What she proves in Eve is that rhyme-and-meter isn't just a formerly fashionable sort of bondage, but a bioacoustic key to memory and emotion." Cindy Williams Gutierrez made a similar point in a review of a later book: “Finch is more shaman than formalist. She is keenly aware of the shape and sound of her poems. Whether in a chant, sonnet, ghazal, or even Billy Collins’ contrived paradelle, her skill is effortless: Form is merely the skin that allows her poems to breathe with ease.”

Poet and critic Ron Silliman has situated Finch in the context of experimental poetry, writing, "Annie Finch can't be a new formalist, precisely because she's passionate both about the new and about form. She is also one of the great risk-takers in contemporary poetry, right up there with Lee Ann Brown & Bernadette Mayer in her willingness to completely shatter our expectations as readers." The experimental aspect of Finch's work became more evident with the publication of Spells, which includes 35 of the poems composed in the 1980s that she refers to as the "lost poems." In the preface to Spells, she describes these as "metrical and experimental poems [that]. . . did not find their audience until the avant-garde's rediscovery of formal poetic strategies just a few years ago."

Reviewing Calendars, poet and Goddess scholar Patricia Monaghan was one of the first critics to articulate the intersection of formal poetics and spirituality in Finch's work, writing, "Annie Finch is a traditionalist. Not in the way the word is commonly used . . . but in a strange experimental way. An oracle, an ecstatic maenad: that is the kind of traditional poet Annie Finch is."

Finch's literary archive was purchased by the Beinecke Rare Book and Manuscript Library at Yale University in 2016.

== Feminism and spirituality ==
In the preface to Spells: New and Selected Poems (2013), Finch writes, "Compiling this book has led me to appreciate how much I was inspired as a poet by coming of age during the feminist movement of the 1970s. Reading it has helped me understand the ways I struggled over the years to throw off the burden of misogyny on my spiritual, psychological, intellectual, political, and poetic identities. My themes are often female-centered . . . I am proud to define myself as a woman poet."

Finch's feminism is also evident in her prose writing, editing, and literary organizing. Her first anthology A Formal Feeling Comes: Poems in Form by Contemporary Women (1993) collected poems and essays by contemporary women poets. The "metrical code," the central theory of her book of literary criticism The Ghost of Meter (1994), is cited in the article on "feminist poetics" by Elaine Showalter in the Princeton Encyclopedia of Poetry and Poetics. Her essay collection The Body of Poetry: Essays on Women, Form, and the Poetic Self (2005) includes writings on women poets including Elizabeth Barrett Browning, Carolyn Kizer, Maxine Kumin, Audre Lorde, Lydia Sigourney, Sara Teasdale, and Phillis Wheatley, many based in feminist theory. In 1997, Finch founded the international listserv Discussion of Women Poets (Wom-Po). She facilitated the listserv until 2004 when she passed ownership of the list to Amy King.

In October 2016, anticipating the #MeToo movement, Finch became one of the first victims of sexual assault in the literary world to name writers, editors, and teachers who had sexually assaulted her during her career.

In 2019 Finch launched a Kickstarter campaign to raise funds for the publication of Choice Words: Writers on Abortion, which the publisher, Haymarket Books, calls "the first major literary anthology about abortion." The Kickstarter launched two days before Alabama passed an abortion ban and reached its fundraising goal in the first week. Choice Words was published in April 2020.

Claire Keyes notes in Scribner's American Writers, "A strong current in [Finch's] work is the decentering of the self, a theme which stems from her deep connection with the natural world and her perception of the self as part of nature." In an interview Finch stated, "Some of my poems are lyric, some narrative, some dramatic, and some meditative, but all are concerned with the mystery of the embodied sacred.". Finch writes in the preface of her 2013 collection Spells: New and Selected Poems that she considers her poems and verse plays to be "spells" whose rhythm and form invite readers "to experience words not just in the mind but in the body."

Finch started a blog called American Witch in 2010 and has published several articles about earth-centered spirituality in The Huffington Post. She maintains the Poetess Priestess blog on Substack.

== Verse plays, libretto, and musical settings ==
Finch's dramatic works of poetry include The Encyclopedia of Scotland (1983), originally performed in a libretto version with live music, as well as Among the Goddesses: An Epic Libretto in Seven Dreams (Red Hen Press, 2010) and Wolf Song, which premiered at Portland, Maine's Mayo Street Arts in 2012. Both plays were collaborative productions incorporating music, dance, puppets, and masks. Finch has also written and performed several works in a genre she calls "poetry ritual theater," combining multimedia poetry performance with interactive audience ritual; these including "Five Directions," premiered at Mayo Street Arts, Portland, Maine, in 2012, directed by Alzenira Quezada, and "Winter Solstice Dreams," premiered at Deepak Homebase, New York, in 2018, directed by Vera Beren.

Composers who have set Finch's poems to music include Stefania de Kennessey, Matthew Harris, and Dale Trumbore. Trumbore's settings of the poems have won the Yale Glee Club Emerging Composers Award, the Gregg Smith Choral Composition Contest, and other awards. Finch was invited by composer Deborah Drattell to write the libretto for the opera Marina, based on the life of poet Marina Tsvetaeva. it was produced by American Opera Projects in 2003, directed by Anne Bogart, and sung by Lauren Flanigan.

== Prosody and literary criticism ==
Finch's 1993 book The Ghost of Meter: Culture and Prosody in American Free Verse uses prosody and postmodern and feminist theory to explore the semiotics of meter in free verse poetry by Walt Whitman, Emily Dickinson, Stephen Crane, T.S. Eliot, Audre Lorde, and other poets. Building on the work of Roland Barthes and on John Hollander's theory of "the metrical frame," Finch calls her theory of metrical meanings "the metrical code." The essay collection The Body of Poetry explores further topics in feminist poetics and poetic form including translation, "Metrical Diversity," and readings of poets including Sara Teasdale, Phillis Wheatley, Elizabeth Barrett Browning, Marilyn Hacker, and John Peck. Finch's edited or coedited anthologies of poetry and poetics include A Formal Feeling Comes: Poems in Form by Contemporary Women, An Exaltation of Forms: Contemporary Poets on the Diversity of Their Art, Villanelles, and Measure for Measure: An Anthology of Poetic Meters. She has also authored a poetry-writing textbook, A Poet's Craft: A Comprehensive Guide to Making and Sharing Your Poetry.

At a time when Emily Dickinson was the only nineteenth-century woman poet receiving critical attention, Finch's 1987 article "The Sentimental Poetess in the World: Metaphor and Subjectivity in Lydia Sigourney's Nature Poetry" approached Sigourney through postmodern theories of the poetic self. A subsequent essay on Sigourney was commissioned for Lydia Sigourney: Critical Essays and Cultural Views (2018), which also included Finch's elegiac poem for Sigourney. In the essay collection The Body of Poetry: Essays on Women, Form, and the Poetic Self, Finch discusses her ideas about "poetess's poetics" in broader terms From 2006 to 2011, Finch served as editor of the Poets on Poetry Series at University of Michigan Press, where she solicited essay collections by poets including Meena Alexander, Reginald Shepherd, Martin Espada, Kazim Ali, and Marilyn Hacker.

== Translation ==
Finch's translation from French of the poetry of Louise Labé was published by University of Chicago Press, honored by the Society for the Study of Early Modern Women, and represented in the Norton Anthology of World Literature. Spells includes translations from Anglo-Saxon, Classical Greek, and Russian. In the preface to Spells and in The Body of Poetry, Finch explains that the physical qualities of the original poem, including meter and rhyme, are central to her translation process.

== Teaching ==
Finch began teaching as a graduate assistant, first at the University of Houston and then at Stanford University, where she TA'ed for Adrienne Rich's "Introduction to Poetry" and developed an original course, "Women, Language, and Literature." She has taught on the creative writing and literature faculties of universities including New College of California, University of Northern Iowa, Miami University (Ohio), and the University of Southern Maine, where she served as Director of the Stonecoast MFA Program from 2004 to 2012. She has facilitated poetry workshops at conferences and literary centers including Wesleyan Writers Conference, Poetry by the Sea, West Chester Poetry Conference, Ruskin Arts Center, and Poets House; and online at Yale Alumni Workshops, 24 Pearl St. and the London Poetry School. She has been a guest lecturer at universities including University of Notre Dame, Indiana University, University of California, Berkeley, University of Toronto, and Harvard University. Since 2020, she has taught poetry, scansion, meter, and ritual classes online.

== Honors and awards ==
- 2012 Sarasvati Award for Poetry from the Association for the Study of Women and Mythology, for Among the Goddesses
- 2010 Phi Beta Kappa Poet, Yale University
- 2009 Robert Fitzgerald Award for Lifetime Contribution to the Art and Craft of Versification
- 2008 Fellowship, Black Earth Institute
- 2006 Honorable Mention for a translation in the field of women's studies by the Society for the Study of Early Modern Women, for Complete Poetry of Louise Labe
- 2005 Alumni Award, University of Houston Creative Writing Program
- 2003 Shortlisted, Forward Poetry Book of the Year Award, for Calendars
- 2002 Finalist, National Poetry Series, for Calendars
- 2002 Finalist, Yale Series of Younger Poets, for Eve
- 2002 Finalist, National Poetry Series, for Eve
- 1993 Nicholas Roerich Fellow, Wesleyan Writers Conference
- 1989 Graduate Fellowship, Stanford Humanities Center
- 1979 Chauncey Brewster Tinker Prize, Yale University
- 1979 Distinction in English, Yale University

== Books ==
=== Poetry ===
- Earth Days, Nirala Publications (Nepal), 2023.
- Spells: New and Selected Poems. Wesleyan University Press, 2012. [Winner, Maine Women Writers Award].
- Among the Goddesses: An Epic Libretto in Seven Dreams Red Hen Press, 2010. [Winner, Sarasvati Award for Poetry, Association for the Study of Women and Mythology].
- Calendars. Tupelo Press, 2003. [Shortlisted, Foreword Poetry Book of the Year Award for 2003, Finalist, National Poetry Series]. Second edition with Audio CD and downloadable Readers' Companion, 2008.
- Eve. Story Line Press. 1997. [Finalist, National Poetry Series, Yale Series of Younger Poets, Brittingham Prize]. Reissued by Carnegie Mellon University Press, Classic Contemporaries Poetry Series, 2010)
- The Encyclopedia of Scotland. Caribou Press, 1982. Reissued by Salt Publishing (U.K.), 2005.

=== Poetry chapbooks ===
- The Poetry Witch Little Book of Spells. Wesleyan University Press, 2019.
- Goddess Poems. Poetry Witch Press, 2015.
- The Voice Was the Sea. Voices From the American Land, 2013.
- Shadow-Bird: From the Lost Poems. Dusie Kollektiv/Ugly Duckling Presse, 2009.
- Annie Finch's Greatest Hits: Poems 1975-2005. Pudding House, 2006.
- Home Birth. Dos Madres Press, 2004.
- Season Poems. Calliope Press, 2002.
- Catching the Mermother. Aralia Press, 1996.
- The Encyclopedia of Scotland: A Libretto. Caribou Press, 1982 (self-published).

=== Translation ===
- The Complete Poetry and Prose of Louise Labé: A Bilingual Edition. Edited with Critical Introductions and Prose Translations by Deborah Lesko Baker and Poetry Translations by Annie Finch. Chicago: University of Chicago Press, 2006. (Translation).

=== Opera libretti ===
- Marina. American Opera Projects, DR2 Theater, New York, 2003.

=== Poetics ===
- A Poet's Ear: A Handbook of Meter and Form. Ann Arbor: University of Michigan Press, 2013.
- A Poet's Craft: A Comprehensive Guide to Making and Shaping Your Poems. Ann Arbor: University of Michigan Press, 2012.
- The Body of Poetry: Essays on Women, Form, and the Poetic Self. Poets on Poetry Series, Ann Arbor: University of Michigan Press, 2005.
- The Ghost of Meter: Culture and Prosody in American Free Verse. Ann Arbor: University of Michigan Press, 1993. Paperback edition with new preface, 2001.

=== Edited books ===
- Choice Words: Writers on Abortion. Chicago, Il: Haymarket Books, 2020.
- A Formal Feeling Comes: Poems in Form by Contemporary Women. Brownsville, OR: Story Line Press, 1994. Reprinted, Textos Books, 2007.
- After New Formalism: Poets on Form, Narrative, and Tradition. Brownsville, OR: Story Line Press, 1999.

=== Coedited books ===
- Measure for Measure: An Anthology of Poetic Meters. With Alexandra Oliver. Random House: Everymans Library, 2015.
- Villanelles. With Marie-Elizabeth Mali. Random House: Everymans Library, 2012.
- Multiformalisms: Postmodern Poetics of Form. With Susan M. Schultz. Textos Books, 2008.
- Lofty Dogmas: Poets on Poetics. With Maxine Kumin and Deborah Brown. University of Arkansas Press, 2005.
- An Exaltation of Forms: Contemporary Poets Celebrate the Diversity of Their Art. With Katherine Varnes. University of Michigan Press, 2002.
- Carolyn Kizer: Perspectives on Her Life and Work. With Johanna Keller and Candace McClelland. CavanKerry Press, 2000.
