= Carper =

Carper is a surname. Notable people with the surname include:

- Jean Carper (born 1932), American medical journalist
- Tom Carper (born 1947), American economist and politician from Delaware
- Thomas Carper (poet), American poet

== See also ==
- Comprehensive Agrarian Reform Program Extension with Reforms or CARP Extension with Reforms, a program of land reform in the Philippines enacted in 2009
