= Ned Balbo =

American poet

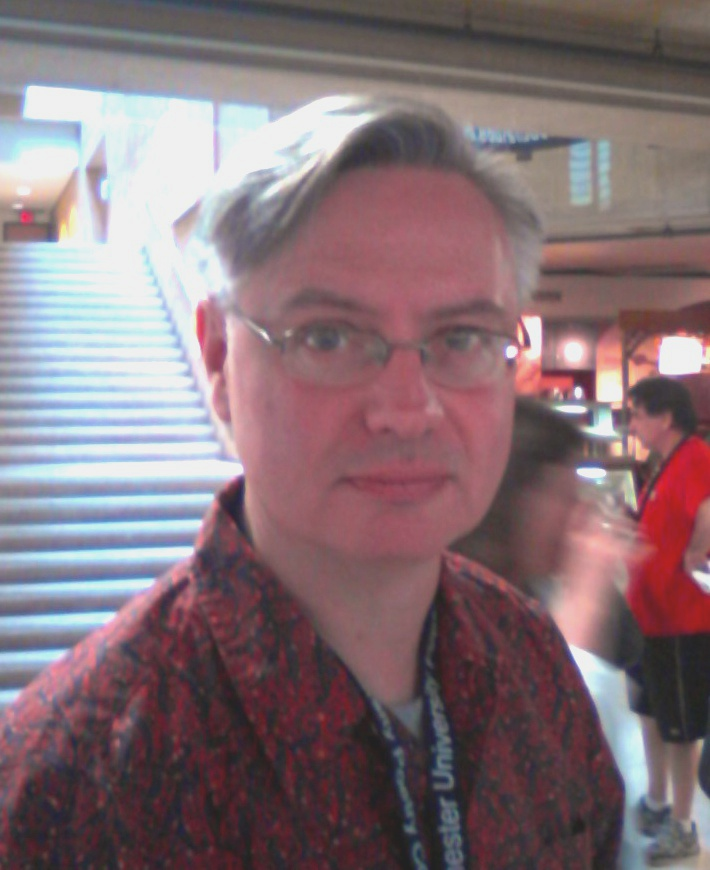
- Ned Balbo attending the West Chester University Poetry Conference
- Born: November 19, 1959 (age 66)
- Education: Brentwood High School '77 Vassar College '81, A.B. Johns Hopkins University '86, M.A. University of Iowa '89, M.F.A.
- Occupations: poet, translator, and essayist
- Spouse: Jane Satterfield
- Writing career
- Genres: poetry, essay
- Notable awards: New Criterion Poetry Prize, 2019 Richard Wilbur Award, 2018 National Endowment for the Arts Literature in Translation Fellowship, 2017 Willis Barnstone Translation Prize co-winner, 2013 Poets' Prize, 2012 Donald Justice Poetry Prize, 2010 ForeWord Magazine's Book of the Year Gold Medal, 2005 Ernest Sandeen Prize in Poetry, 2005 Robert Frost Foundation Poetry Award, 2003 John Guyon Prize in Literary Nonfiction, 2002 Towson University Prize for Literature co-winner, 1998

Ned Balbo (born November 19, 1959, Mineola, New York) is an American poet, translator, and essayist.

== Life ==
Ned Balbo grew up on Long Island, New York. He was raised by Betty and Carmine Balbo, his birth mother's half-sister and her husband. His birth parents are Donald R. and Elaine D. Osterloh who were not yet married to each other. The couple had previously conceived Balbo's older sister who was raised by paternal relatives. At thirteen Balbo learned he was adopted and was informed of his birth parents' and sister's identities. This background informs his creative work.

Balbo graduated from Brentwood High School in 1977. He earned his Bachelor of Arts at Vassar College in 1981, his Master of Arts at Johns Hopkins University in 1986, and his Master of Fine Arts at the Iowa Writers' Workshop in 1989.

Balbo taught poetry and prose at Loyola University Maryland from 1990 to 2014. He was also a visiting faculty member in the MFA program in Creative Writing and Environment at Iowa State University. He is married to poet-essayist Jane Satterfield.

== Poetry and style ==
According to Lisa Vihos in Verse Wisconsin, "Balbo...gives shape and heft to the formless, fleeting past — both historical and personal — through his rich language." In reviewing The Trials of Edgar Poe and Other Poems for JMWW, Patricia Valdata observes that Balbo's work "raises difficult questions about home, about the relationship of parent to child, about a society's responsibility to its poor." Writing in Studio, Lucas Jacob notes that in The Trials of Edgar Poe and Other Poems, "Balbo...reminds us of the grace we find in our time with each other on this 'island' of life on Earth." Lesley Wheeler, writing on-line in Kenyon Review, asserts that "Balbo’s complicated sense of place and his poetic resourcefulness make [Upcycling Paumanok] worth your time, but what impresses me most are the extended narrative lyrics, the first of which appears several pages in. Balbo’s deftness at balancing story and music is often breathtaking."

In his essay "Ned Balbo's Family Narrative," published in his blog and in Birmingham Poetry Review, David Katz writes, "Although Balbo’s prosodic and formal mastery enable him to rise to lyrical heights in individual poems, there’s a complex family narrative — call it a personal mythology — running through the entire body of work, starting with his first book, Galileo's Banquet, that resonates powerfully from poem to poem as well as with the outside world." Katz argues, "Following 3 Nights of the Perseids — a veritable book of forms... — [The Cylburn Touch-Me-Nots] is a breakthrough for Balbo, a blossoming of the poet’s essential content...[H]e emerges with a freshness of tone in the newer book, in which overt formal virtuosity recedes in favor of a more spontaneous musicality and openness of emotion."

Balbo has written in a variety of forms, including blank verse, sonnets, villanelles, sestinas, and nonce forms, as well as free verse. His poetic influences include Ai, Elizabeth Bishop, Louise Bogan, Robert Frost, Randall Jarrell, Denis Johnson, Weldon Kees, and others.

== Awards ==
In addition to book awards, Balbo received a 2017 National Endowment for the Arts Literature in Translation Fellowship. He is the recipient of three Maryland Arts Council Individual Artist Awards in poetry and the Robert Frost Foundation Poetry Award.

He received the John Guyon Literary Nonfiction Prize for the essay "Walt Whitman's Finches: on discretion and disclosure in autobiography and adoption," published in the literary journal Crab Orchard Review in 2002. "My Father's Music," an essay on adoption, ethnicity, and popular culture, and a finalist for the Pirate's Alley William Faulkner Society's gold medal in the Essay, appears in Our Roots Are Deep with Passion: Creative Nonfiction Collects New Essays by Italian American Writers (Other Press, 2006). An Italian version of this essay (Carla Antonucci, translator) appeared as “La Musica di mio padre” in Padri: Tre memoir italo americani, edited by Anna Maria Crispino (Iacobelli: Rome, 2009).

Balbo has also been a Walter E. Dakin fellow at the Sewanee Writers' Conference and several times a fellow in poetry at the Virginia Center for the Creative Arts .

== Bibliography ==
=== Books ===
- 2019 — The Cylburn Touch-Me-Nots (Criterion Books; winner of the 2019 New Criterion Poetry Prize)
- 2019 — 3 Nights of the Perseids (University of Evansville Press; winner of the 2018 Richard Wilbur Award)
- 2016 — Upcycling Paumanok (Measure Press)
- 2010 — The Trials of Edgar Poe and Other Poems (Story Line Press; winner of Donald Justice Poetry Prize and 2012 Poets' Prize)
- 2005 — Lives of the Sleepers (University of Notre Dame Press; winner of Ernest Sandeen Prize and ForeWord Magazine's Book of the Year Award, Gold Medal in Poetry)
- 1998 — Galileo’s Banquet (Washington Writers' Publishing House; shared Towson University Prize for Literature with God's Long Summer by Charles Marsh)

=== Chapbook ===
- 2009 — Something Must Happen (Finishing Line Press)

=== Essays ===
- 2006 — “My Father’s Music.” Our Roots Are Deep with Passion: Creative Nonfiction collects new essays by Italian-American writers. Eds. Lee Gutkind and Joanna Clapps Herman. New York: Other Press, 2006: 87–103.
- 2003 — “Paul Is Dead, and We’re All Listening: Rumor and Revelation, 1969.” Spec. nonfiction issue of JMWW (2011). [Originally appeared in Die Cast Garden 2 (2003).]
- 2002 — “Walt Whitman’s Finches: of discretion and disclosure in autobiography and adoption.” Crab Orchard Review 8.1 (2002): 180–95.
