= Radna =

Radna may refer to:

- Radna, Sevnica, Slovenian settlement
- Radna, a village in Lipova, Arad County, Romania

== See also ==
- Ratna (disambiguation)
