= Sarper =

Sarper is a Turkish surname. Notable people with the surname include:

- Ceren Sarper (born 1990), Turkish basketball player
- Mehmet Sarper Kiskaç (born 1990), Turkish footballer
- Selim Sarper (1899–1968), Turkish diplomat and politician

== See also ==
- Carper
