= David Stevenson =

David Stevenson may refer to:

== Sports ==
- Dave Stevenson (born 1941), Scottish pole vaulter (1964 Olympic Games)
- David Stevenson (cricketer) (1890–1974), Scottish cricketer
- David Stevenson (cyclist) (1882–1938), British Olympic road racing cyclist
- David Stevenson (footballer, born 1958), Scottish footballer (Dumbarton FC)
- David Stevenson (Hibernian footballer) (fl. 1913–1928), Scottish footballer
- David Stevenson (tennis) (born 1999), British tennis player

== Other people ==
- David Barker Stevenson (1801–1859), Canadian businessman and politician
- David J. Stevenson (born 1948), professor in planetary science at Caltech
- David Stevenson (admiral) (1918–1998), Australian admiral; Chief of Staff, 1973–1976
- David Stevenson (engineer) (1815–1886), Scottish lighthouse designer and engineer
  - David Alan Stevenson (1854–1938), his son, Scottish lighthouse designer and engineer
- David Stevenson (English historian) (born 1954), professor in international history at the London School of Economics
- David Stevenson (Scottish historian), emeritus professor of Scottish history at the University of St Andrews
- David Watson Stevenson (1842–1904), Scottish sculptor

== See also ==
- David Stephenson (disambiguation)
