= Crown of sonnets =

Sequence of linked sonnets

A crown of sonnets or sonnet corona is a sequence of sonnets, usually addressed to one person, and/or concerned with a single theme. Each of the sonnets explores one aspect of the theme, and is linked to the preceding and succeeding sonnets by repeating the final line of the preceding sonnet as its first line. The first line of the first sonnet is repeated as the final line of the final sonnet, thereby bringing the sequence to a close.

== Heroic crown ==
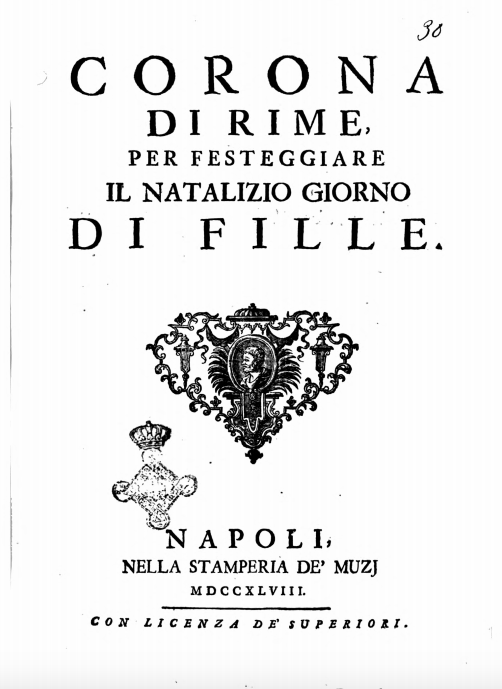
Title page of Corona di rime per festeggiare il natalizio giorno di fille from 1748

An advanced form of crown of sonnets is also called a sonnet redoublé or heroic crown, comprising fifteen sonnets, in which the sonnets are linked as described above, but the final binding sonnet is made up of all the first or the last lines of the preceding fourteen, in order. This form was invented by the Siena Academy, which was formed in 1460, but there are no existing crowns of sonnets written by them. The form was first described by Giovanni Mario Crescimbeni in his work L'Istoria della volgar poesia (History of Vernacular Poetry), published in Venice, 1731 and later by P.G. Bisso in his Introduzione alla volgar poesia (Introduction to Vernacular Poetry), published in Venice, 1794. A variation on the form is sometimes used in which the binding sonnet is the first sonnet, and subsequent sonnets end with a line taken from it in order. The oldest complete crown which survived time was published in 1748. It was written by a group of 14 poets to celebrate the birth of the ideal woman: Corona di rime per festeggiare il natalizio giorno di fille.

John Donne wrote La corona, a set of 7 sonnets which are linked together. Because there are only 7 of them and no final binding sonnet, La corona is not a full heroic crown. Probably the first full crown of sonnets in English is Lady Mary Wroth's A Crown of Sonnets Dedicated to Love which is from circa 1620.

The children's book A Wreath for Emmett Till by Marilyn Nelson also follows the form of a heroic crown of sonnets. Another well-known and frequent author of contemporary crowns of sonnets is Marilyn Hacker. "Intertidal", a collaborative crown of sonnets by contemporary poets Judith Barrington, Annie Finch, Julie Kane, Julia Lisella, D'Arcy Randall, Kathrine Varnes, and Lesley Wheeler, was organized through discussion on the Wom-Po listserv and published in 2007. The form is used frequently by Tyehimba Jess, both in his first book Leadbelly, and multiple times in his Pulitzer-prize winning collection Olio, which is structured around a heroic crown of persona poems in the voices of the original Fisk Jubilee Singers.

21st Century crowns in English are e.g. by Linda Bierds, Andrea Carter Brown, Robert Darling, Moira Egan, Jenny Factor, Andrei Krylov, Rachael Briggs, Julie Fay, Constance Merritt, Julie Sophia Paegle, Marie Ponsot, Patricia Smith, Marilyn Taylor, Natasha Trethewey, David Trinidad, John Murillo, John McDonough, Kathrine Varnes, Angela Alaimo O'Donnell, Laurie Ann Guerrero, Cindy Tran, Alicia Mountain, and Robert Luis Rodriguez. Fiona Chamness's heroic crown Choreography for Ensemble won the 2014 Beloit Poetry Prize. Joelle Taylor's "dust kings, tough kids", subtitled "a broken crown of sonnets", uses the form to represent butch lesbian subjectivity and history.

A Wreath of Sonnets (Slovene: Sonetni venec) is the oldest Slovenian crown of sonnets, written by the Romantic poet France Prešeren. It was written in 1833 and was enriched with acrostic in the final sonnet. Prešeren's crown of sonnets was translated into Russian in 1889, which had great influence on many poets, including Valery Bryusov. Jaroslav Seifert wrote his sentimental Věnec sonetů (A Wreath of Sonnets) in this form about Prague, with an authorized translation by Jan Křesadlo, who also composed his own emigre riposte in the same format, as well as writing several other sonnet cycles. The poet Venko Markovski wrote and published more than 100 crowns of sonnets, which also contained acrostics dedicated to various historical figures.

The oldest Dutch crown of sonnets is written by H.Th. Boelen in 1876: 'Saffo-fantasie', published in a journal for theatre. The second Dutch crown is by Eliza Laurillard: 'Der bloemen lof', published in his book Bloemen en knoppen from 1878. Jeanne Reyneke van Stuwe wrote the third Dutch crown, her book Impressies (1898) opens with a crown. In the 20th and 21st Century the crown became a regular form of poetry in Dutch literature, with authors like Frédéric Bastet, Ilja Leonard Pfeijffer, Frank van Pamelen, Wouter Ydema, and O.B. Kunst.

A Celestial Crown of Sonnets, written by Sam Illingworth and Stephen Paul Wren, was published in 2021 by Penteract Press. It explores the development of astronomy from Thales of Miletus to Shi Shen to William Herschel.

== Heroic crown of crowns ==
In German

In 1828 the German poet Ludwig Bechstein published Sonettenkränze. This book consists of 14 crowns of sonnets. However Bechstein did not link the 14 final binding sonnets together to make a new crown.

In Dutch

Een kruisweg van alledaags leed was the first crown of crowns in Dutch literature, other Dutch crown of crowns are e.g. Dichter bij het eind, 't Is egoïstisch, maar 't is mooi geweest, Ik maak er gauw een eind aan, en ik kom, Met rasse schreden naar het laatste feest, and Zo feestend leef ik naar het einde toe by Olax. Evi Aarens is, after Olax, the second individual poet who wrote a Dutch crown of crowns. In 2021 she published Disoriëntaties, a crown of crowns about the history of mankind.

Bas Jongenelen and Martijn Neggers claimed to have written the first crown of crowns of sonnets in 2016: Een kruisweg van alledaags leed. But their claim is unsubstantiated.

In Slovenian

The first crown of crowns ever was written by Mitja Šarabon in Slovenia in 1971: Sonetni venec sonetnih vencev.

From 1994 dates Sla sponina by Janko Moder. Milan Batista published in 1998 Veliki sonetni venec, and Valentin Cundrič published in the same year 8 crowns of crowns, one of those is Pamtivid (which can also be found online). The other 7 crowns of crowns are published in his book Slovenska knjiga mrtvih. 2 of those are also published on the Internet: Molitvenik peščeni en Terjatve.

In Russian

Russian literature has a tradition on crowns of crowns. Vladimir Germanovich Vasilyev wrote in 1987 his Мир, but he wasn't able to publish it as a book, in 2016 he published it online.

Anatoly Martynov published in 1996 Благовест.

In 2007, the Russian poet Natalia Shamberova published "The Mists of August", a wreath of wreaths: 211 interlacing sonnets composed of 14 wreaths of sonnets to form the wreath of magistrals, and a final sonnet called the magistrals' magistral.

In 2010 came Arkady Alferov with Корона венков сонетов and in 2011 Sergey Don Тебе, мой город, and Elin Grigory Yakovlevich Колокол Герцелойды,

Izyaslav Kotlyarov published in 2001 Земля простит, но не прощает небо and in 2015 Ещё за далью и за высотой uit. Not every crown of crown has a known year of publication.

Vladimir Ostapenko’s two crowns of crowns Отшельник and Монолог for example. Or Корона жизни – Око by Leo Himmelsohn.

Also Mark Polykovsky’s Волшебство сна is undated, just as Метаморфозы by Sluka Alexander Yaroslavovich, Мировоззре́ние Ми́стика by Igor Morozov, При све́те – Не уснуть van Ananyin Valery Zosimovich, and Моя Мифологики by Alexander Chetverkin.

In Belarusian

In Belarus, there are several instances of crowns of crowns: in 2015 Sophia Nikolaevna Shah published Мару стаць я мастаком. Special about the crown of crowns is that it's a children's book. Shah also published the crown of crowns Адухаўленне (2000), Прысвячэнне (2001), Прызначэнне (2002), Увасабленне (2003), Спасціжэнне (2004), Азарычы (2007) en Каб тое выказаць… (2015).

In Portuguese

The first crown of crowns outside Europe was published in Brazil by the poet Paulo Camelo in 2002: Coroas de uma coroa (Crowns of a crown). He also published in 2020 Mulheres, mulheres. In 2024 he published Via Crucis, his third crown of crowns.

Joedson Adriano da Silva Santos is also a Brazilian poet of crown of crowns, his Alcides is about Hercules, and published as a poster. In his later published book Alcides he published three complete crowns of crowns: 'Teoria e Práxis', 'Parerga e Paralipomena' and 'Dodecatlo'. This last crown of crowns is the same as Alcides on the poster.

In English

In English literature John Patrick McDonough's set of three Crowns of Heroic Crowns "O Logos Tou Theou" was completed in 2020. It was officially published on January 13, 2024.

In 2021 Daniel Ståhl published Requiem - In memory of all that should have been. It claims to be a heroic crown of crowns. But the sonnets are not linked together, Ståhl's crowns consists of 14 individual sonnets which are not woven together, the final sonnet is made of the first lines of the 14 sonnets before it. So Requiem is not a fully real crown of crowns. This technique looks like the one which the Slovenian poet Anton Gričnik used in 2005 in his Hvalnica Življenju. This book has 14 crowns, but they do not form a strict interwoven 15th crown, because the 14 final binding sonnets are not linked together.

Dominic Peloso published a complete English-language Heroic Crown of Heroic Crowns titled "Sonnets of the Commedia dell'Arte" in 2023, based on the work of 16th century Italian playwright Flaminio Scala.

Templates

Bas Jongenelen published on 2021-09-14 on neerlandistiek.nl (a scholarly website for Dutch language and literature) an Excel sheet to make a crown of crowns: First you write and fill in the grand-master sonnet; the lines of which jump to the 14 master sonnets. If you write the 14 master sonnets, the lines jump to the 196 individual sonnets.

== See also ==
- Sonnet cycle
