= East Bayside =

Neighborhood in Portland, Maine

Coordinates: 43°39′45.4″N 70°15′13.8″W

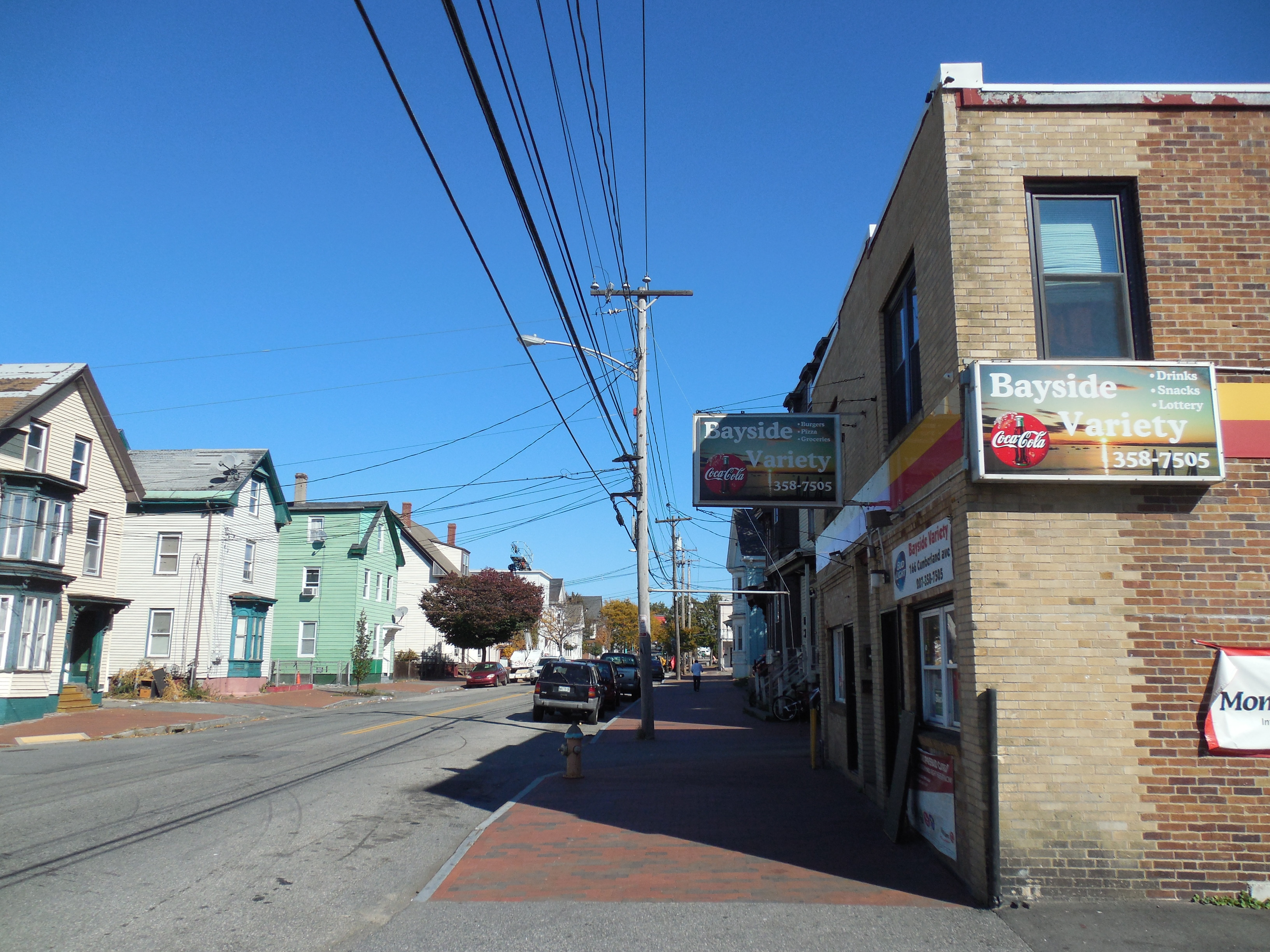
Bayside Variety

East Bayside is a neighborhood in Portland, Maine. It is bordered by Franklin Street on the west, Washington Avenue on the east, to the north by Marginal Way, and the south by Congress Street. It is bordered by the neighborhoods of Bayside, the Old Port and Munjoy Hill. It is often confused with the Bayside neighborhood, which is on the opposite side of Franklin Street.

East Bayside was first developed a street network in the early 19th century. By the 1820s the area was Portland's second seaport via the Back Cove’s ship channel. Much of the debris from the great Portland fire of 1866 was deposited into Back Cove, significantly increasing the size of Bayside and East Bayside. Maps produced around 1900 show an extension of the shoreline out to Marginal Way and beyond. The shoreline would not change again until the construction of the Interstate in 1974.

In the 19th century the Bayside and East Bayside neighborhoods were a mix of residential, commercial, and industrial uses. Manufacturing, including a foundry and a rope factory, was served, first by ship traffic on Back Cove and later, when the Cove channel was abandoned, by rail. The original rail line roughly forms the demarcation between the industrial zone, now located to the north of Fox Street, and the residential uses to the south.

In the early 1950s the newly created Slum Clearance and Redevelopment Authority highlighted East Bayside as a target neighborhood. In 1958 the Authority demolished the Little Italy neighborhood, a portion of which was in what we now call East Bayside, razing 92 dwellings and 27 small businesses. Another 54 dwelling units were razed for the Bayside Park urban renewal project, an area that now includes Fox Field and Kennedy Park public housing. The first phase of the Kennedy Park was built in 1965. Several streets were truncated in an attempt to limit access to outside traffic. The razing of Franklin Street began in 1967; 100 structures were demolished and an unknown number of families relocated or were displaced. The neighborhood was cut off from Bayside and the Old Port when the four-lane, limited access Franklin Arterial was built to allow people who lived outside of Portland to enter and exit the city rapidly. Many existing streets, such as Oxford Street, were truncated by the creation of the road, creating a confusing street grid where roads have the same name but don't connect.

The neighborhood has historically provided a home for recent immigrants with large population of Irish, Scandinavians, and Italians in the late 19th century. During the early 20th century over 250 Armenian families settled in the neighborhood. More recently East Bayside has become home to new immigrants including Cambodians, Vietnamese, and, most recently, Sudanese, Somalis, and Iraqis.

The neighborhood is also prone to severe flooding events during King Tides, rainstorms, and during the spring snow melt. This is likely because some of the area sits on artificial land. Climate change has proven to be a problem for Bayside, with some sources showing that Back Cove may expand back to its original pre-19-century levels by 2100, making most of Bayside uninhabitable once again.

According to the 2010 census, Census Tract 5 is the most diverse section of Portland, Maine. It is 60% White, 21% Black, 6% Hispanic, 8% Asian, 1% Native American, and 4% Multiracial.

In 2011, Mayo Street Arts, a community arts venue, opened on Mayo Street, adjacent to Kennedy Park in the previously unoccupied St. Angsar Church.
