= Len Krisak =

American poet (born 1948)

- Born: 1948 (age 77–78)
- Education: Brandeis University; University of Michigan
- Occupation: Poet
- Writing career
- Genre: Poetry

Len Krisak (born July 30, 1948) is an American poet.

He graduated from University of Michigan, and Brandeis University. He taught at Brandeis University, Northeastern University, and Stonehill College.

His work has appeared in Agenda, Commonweal, Raritan, The Sewanee Review, The Hudson Review, PN Review, The Antioch Review, Measure, The Formalist, The Cumberland Poetry Review, Tennessee Quarterly, Classical Outlook, Pivot, Rattapallax, and The Weekly Standard. He has read his work at the Newburyport Literary Festival and other sites throughout New England. He is a former member of the Powow River Poets.

He was also a contestant on Jeopardy! in 1995, winning $43,399 in four games and giving himself a berth in that year's Tournament of Champions.

Krisak also won the Gold Pocket.com National Trivia Competition.

== Works ==
- Midland (Somers Rocks Press, 1999)
- Fugitive Child (Aralia Press, 1999)
- Even as We Speak (University of Evansville Press, 2000, ISBN 978-0-930982-53-9)
- If Anything (WordTech Editions, 2004, ISBN 9781932339079)
- Afterimage (Measure Press, 2014, ISBN 9781939574060)

=== As translator ===
- The Odes of Horace (Carcanet, 2006, ISBN 978-1-85754-851-8)
- Virgil's Eclogues (University of Pennsylvania Press, 2010, ISBN 978-0-8122-4225-6)
- Rainer Maria Rilke: New Poems (Boydell & Brewer, 2015, ISBN 978-1-57113-950-4)
- Ovid's Erotic Poems: Amores and Ars Amatoria (University of Pennsylvania Press, 2014, ISBN 978-0-8122-4625-4)
- Virgil: Aeneid (Focus Classical Library, 2020)

=== Anthologies ===
- "Tantalus III", Gods and mortals: modern poems on classical myths, Editor Nina Kossman, Oxford University Press, 2001, ISBN 978-0-19-513341-7

== Awards and honors ==
- 2000 Richard Wilbur Award
- Robert Penn Warren Prize
- Robert Frost Prize
- 2009 Der-Hovanessian Translation Award, New England Poetry Club
- Los Angeles Poetry Festival
- Pinch Prize
