= Robert Daseler =

American playwright, and poet

- Born: 1945 (age 80–81)
- Occupations: Writer, playwright, poet
- Website: www.robertdaseler.com

Robert Daseler (born 1945) is an American playwright, and poet.

He graduated from Pomona College in 1967. He was director of public affairs for Claremont McKenna College, and director of communication at the Office of the State Librarian.

His work has appeared in the Formalist, The London Magazine,

== Awards ==
- 1998 Richard Wilbur Award
- Writers' Digest runner-up

== Works ==
- "First Site", ART
- Shades of California: The Hidden Beauty of Ordinary Life 2001
- Levering Avenue: Poems University of Evansville Press, 1998, ISBN 978-0-930982-51-5
- "Introduction", Shades of California: the hidden beauty of ordinary life : California's family album, Editor Kimi Kodani Hill, Heyday Books, 2001, ISBN 978-1-890771-44-7

=== Plays ===
- Alekhine's Defense, South Coast Repertory (world premiere) 1990
  - Plays from South Coast Repertory, Volume 1, Broadway Play Publishing, 1993, ISBN 978-0-88145-111-5
- Dragon lady : a play in two acts. 1989
