= Terry Stickels =

Terry Stickels (born May 14, 1948) is the author of numerous puzzle books, calendars, card decks and posters featuring critical thinking skills. Born in Omaha, Nebraska, he is the oldest of three children. Stickels is a lifelong member of Mensa, One In A Thousand Society (now known as Termite) and The International High IQ Society and the Epimetheus Society. He currently resides in Fort Worth, Texas.

Terry Stickels is a graduate of University of Nebraska at Omaha with a BS in Geography and Natural Sciences. He attended on a football scholarship where he played quarterback. While a student, he tutored in math and physics using puzzles as a non-intimidating approach to teaching concepts. After years of creating puzzles, Stickels began his publishing career in 1991 with a Rochester, NY weekly newspaper puzzle column.

Today Stickels is popular with business leaders, teachers and students for his presentations on having fun and success using an individual's mental flexibility. Stickels also pens three nationally syndicated columns. He currently works at KD College Prep in Colleyville.

== Published works ==
=== Newspaper columns ===
- USA Weekend Magazine
- King Features Syndicate
- Worldwide newspapers

=== Books ===
- Mindstretching Puzzles Sterling Publishing—1994 ISBN 0-8069-0694-4
- Mind Workout Puzzles ISBN 0-8069-9658-7, 2001 Sterling Publishing
- Think-ercises – Book 1 Critical Thinking Press & Software, 1995 Later renamed: Brain Stretchers – Book 3 © 1995, 1996 ISBN 0-89455-633-9
- Mind-Bending Puzzle Books Pomegranate Communications, Inc.

- Book I, 1998 – ISBN 0-7649-0690-9
- Book II, 1998 – ISBN 0-7649-0691-7
- Book III, 1999 – ISBN 0-7649-1025-6
- Book IV, 1999 – ISBN 0-7649-1026-4

- Cunning Mind-Bending Puzzles – Sterling, 2002 – ISBN 0-8069-8803-7
- Mesmerizing Mind-Bending Puzzles –Sterling 2002 – ISBN 0-8069-8774-X
- Devious Mind-Bending Puzzles – Sterling 2002 – ISBN 0-8069-8807-X
- Are You as Smart as You Think? St. Martin's Press, officially the imprint is Thomas Dunne Books/St. Martin's Griffin, 2000 – ISBN 0-312-20911-8
- Just How Smart Are You? Thomas Dunne Books/St. Martin's Griffin 2002 – ISBN 0-312-28169-2
- Puzzling Frame Games Scholastic, 2002 – ISBN 0-439-38878-3
- Challenging Coin Puzzles Scholastic 2003 – ISBN 0-439-38879-1
- Sit & Solve Frame Games Sterling, 2004 – ISBN 1-4027-1147-6
- Puzzle Power – How to Jump-Start Your Mind Prometheus Books, 2004 ISBN 1-59102-203-7
- Sit & Solve Mindstretch Puzzles Sterling Publishing, 2005 ISBN 1-4027-2135-8
- Classic Mind Benders Main Street Books, 2005 ISBN 1-4027-2359-8
- Little Book of Bathroom Sudoku 2005 Fair Finds Press (Rockport Publishing) November 2005 ISBN 1-59233-219-6
- Little Book of Bathroom Kakuro: 200 Original Cross-sums Puzzles for Brain-Sharpening Entertainment, Fair Winds Press, March 2006, ISBN 1-59233-244-7
- The Pocket Book of Frame Games: Hundreds of Mind–Bending Word Puzzles from the King of Brainteasers, Fair Winds Press, April 2006, ISBN 1-59233-195-5
- The Big Book of Mind-Bending Puzzles, American Mensa Ltd., paperback, Sterling, May 2006, ISBN 1-4027-3255-4
- The Big Book of Stickelers, Fair Winds Press – 2006, ISBN 1-59233-225-0
- USA Weekend Frame Games, Copyright 2006 – Terry Stickels, Published by USA Weekend Magazine
- Magick Word – Doku, Harper Collins – 2007, ISBN 0-06-125711-7
- Pirate Word – Doku, Harper Collins – 2007, ISBN 0-06-125481-9
- Spider – Man 3, Harper Collins – 2007, ( Harperentertainment), Puzzles by Terry Stickels, With Sam Bellotto, Jr., ISBN 0-06-083731-4
- Stickdoku Puzzle Book, USA Weekend Magazine, 2007
- Entertain Your Brain, August 2007, Sterling Innovation, ISBN 1-4027-4794-2
- Frame Games II, USA Weekend Magazine, 2007
- Brain Games Book 3, Publications International, February 2008, ISBN 978-1-4127-1452-5
- Brain Games Book 4, Publications International, February 2008, ISBN 978-1-4127-1453-2
- Quotable Cryptograms: 500 Famous Quotes to Decipher, Random House Puzzles & Games, With Sam Bellotto, Jr., February 2008, ISBN 0-375-72263-7
- Brain Games Book 5, Publications International, May 2008, ISBN 978-1-4127-1598-0
- Brain Games Book 6, Publications International, May 2008, ISBN 978-1-4127-1597-3
- Math Puzzles and Brainteasers 3–5, Wiley & Sons, September 2009, ISBN 978-0-470-22719-0
- Math Puzzles and Brainteasers 6–8, Wiley & Sons, September 2009, ISBN 978-0-470-22720-6
- Mammoth Book of Brain Teasers, Constable & Robinson, Fall 2009, ISBN 978-0-7624-3624-8
- The Big Brain Puzzle Book, Time Inc Home Entertainment, Fall 2009
- Trickledown & Sticklinks, Go Games, August 2010, ISBN 978-1-936140-11-4
- Crosswords, Go Games, August 2010, ISBN 978-1-936140-07-7
- Word Search, August 2010, ISBN 978-1-936140-09-1
- Sudoku, Go Games, August 2010, ISBN 978-1-936140-08-4
- Brain Games Word Puzzles, Publications International, October 2010, ISBN 978-1-4508-0265-9
- Sharpen Your IQ, Lower Your Brain Age in Minutes a Day, Publications International, January 2011, ISBN 978-1-4508-1015-9
- Improve Your Memory, Lower Your Brain Age in Minutes a Day, Publications International, January 2011, ISBN 978-1-4508-1016-6
- Challenging Puzzles for Smart Kids, Imagine Publishing, Inc., August 2011, ISBN 978-1-936140-41-1
- Tough Puzzles for Smart Kids, Imagine Publishing, Inc., August 2011, ISBN 978-1-936140-40-4

=== Card decks ===
- Mind-Bending Puzzles – Positively Perplexing Math and Word Problems Pomegranate, 1998 ISBN 0-7649-0325-X
- Mind-Bending Puzzles 2 – Positively Perplexing Math & Word Problems Pomegranate, 1998 ISBN 0-7649-0378-0
- Mind-Bending Puzzles 3 – Frame Games Pomegranate, 1998 ISBN 0-7649-0701-8
- Mind-Bending Puzzles 4 – Spatial-Visual Challengers Pomegranate, 1998 ISBN 0-7649-0968-1
- Mind-Bending Puzzles 5 –Math & Word Problems Pomegranate, 1998 ISBN 0-7649-1054-X
- Mind-Bending Puzzles 6 – Frame Games Pomegranate, 1998 ISBN 0-7649-1055-8
- Geography Q&A Pomegranate, 1998 ISBN 0-7649-1106-6

=== Calendars ===
- Mind-Bending Puzzles Pomegranate 1997 ISBN 0-87654-921-0
- Mind-Bending Puzzles Pomegranate 1998 ISBN 0-7649-0101-X
- Mind-Bending Puzzles Pomegranate 1999 ISBN 0-7649-0436-1
- Mind-Bending Puzzles Pomegranate 2000 ISBN 0-7649-0787-5
- Mind-Bending Puzzles Pomegranate 2001 ISBN 0-7649-1145-7
- Mindstretch Andrews McMeel 2002 ISBN 0-7407-1682-4
- Mindstretch Barnes & Noble 2003 ISBN 0-7607-3198-5
- Frame Games Andrews McMeel 2005 ISBN 0-7407-4311-2
- 365 Fiendishly Difficult Sudoku Puzzles Barnes & Noble 2006 ISBN 0-7607-8013-7
- Killer Su Doku Borders Edition, Browntrout Publishing, May 2006. ISBN 1-4216-1687-4
- Killer Su Doku, Browntrout Publishing, July 2006, ISBN 1-4216-1686-6
- Kakuro, Browntrout Publishing July 2006, ISBN 1-4216-1674-2
- Frame Games, Browntrout Publishing, July 2006 ISBN 1-4216-1675-0
- Frame Games 2009 Page-A-Day Calendar, USA Weekend, August 2008
- Frame Games 2010 Daily Page Calendar, USA Weekend, August 2009, ISBN 978-0-615-29821-4
- Frame Games 2011 Daily Desk Calendar, USA Weekend, August 2011, ISBN 978-0-692-00967-3
- 2012 Word Search, A Year of Entertain Your Brain, Calendar Club, August 2011, ISBN 978-0-7630-1499-5
- 2012 Sudoku, A Year of Entertain Your Brain, Calendar Club, August 2011, ISBN 978-0-7630-1466-7
- Frame Games 2013 Daily Desk Calendar, TF Publishing, August 2012, ISBN 978-1-61776-451-6

=== Calendars turned into books ===
- Mind-Bending Puzzles Pomegranate Publishing, 1997 ISBN 0-87654-921-0
- Mind-Bending Puzzles Pomegranate Publishing, 1998 ISBN 0-7649-0101-X
- 'Mind-Bending Puzzles Pomegranate Publishing, 2000 ISBN 0-7649-0787-5
- Mind-Bending Puzzles Pomegranate Publishing, 2001 ISBN 0-7649-1145-7
- Mindstretch Andrews McMeel, 2002 ISBN 0-7407-1682-4
- Mindstretch Barnes & Noble, 2003 ISBN 0-7607-3198-5

=== Jointly authored books ===
- Puzzle Chest Barnes and Noble, 2003 ISBN 0-7607-4916-7
- Puzzles for the Super Sharp Sterling Publishing, 2003 ISBN 1-4027-0876-9
- The Brainiac's Puzzle Book Sterling Publishing, 2003 ISBN 1-4027-0875-0
- Classic Shrewd Challengers Main Street Books, 2005 ISBN 1-4027-2358-X
- Puzzle Chest Main Street Books, January 2006 ISBN 1-4027-3151-5
- Go! Games Sudoku, Imagine Publishing, Inc., January 2010, ISBN 978-1-936140-08-4
- Go! Games Crossword, Imagine Publishing, Inc., January 2010, ISBN 978-1-936140-07-7
- Go Games, The Word Search Challenge, Imagine Publishing, an imprint of Charlesbridge Publishing, January 2012, ISBN 978-1-936140-58-9
- Go Games, The Sudoku Challenge, Imagine Publishing, an imprint of Charlesbridge Publishing, January 2012, ISBN 978-1-936140-59-6
- The Art of the Illusion, Charlesbridge Publishing, August 2012, ISBN 978-1-936140-71-8
- Go Games Absolutely Addictive Sudoku, Charlesbridge Publishing, January 2013, ISBN 978-1-936140-89-3
- Go Games Absolutely Addictive Word Search, Charlesbridge Publishing, January 2013, ISBN 978-1-936140-90-9
