= A Wreath of Sonnets =

Original publication

A Wreath of Sonnets (Slovene: Sonetni venec), sometimes also translated as A Garland of Sonnets, is a crown of sonnets that was written by France Prešeren in 1833. It was published for the first time in the German-language Ljubljana newspaper Illyrisches Blatt (Illyrian Newspaper) on 22 February 1834. It consists of 15 sonnets and is enriched with acrostic in the concluding sonnet. In the crown, Prešeren tied together the motives of his own unhappy love towards Julija Primic with those of an unhappy, subjugated homeland.

== Form ==
Besides the complex and sophisticated content, A Wreath of Sonnets has an interesting format, too: the last line of one sonnet becomes the first line of the next one, making all fourteen sonnets of the circle an intertwining "garland" of lyric poetry; one sonnet cannot exist without the other. The first lines of all the single fourteen sonnets form in turn another sonnet, called the "Master Theme" or the Magistrale. In the Slovene original, the first letters of every verse form the words Primicovi Julji, meaning "to Julija Primic".

== Content ==
In the seventh sonnet, Prešeren made something that was later seen as a prophecy of his own glory: referring to the ancient myth of Orpheus, he invoked the skies to send a new Orpheus to the Slovenes, the beauty of whose poetry would inspire patriotism, help overcome internal disputes, and unify all Slovenes into one nation again. In the eighth sonnet, he went on in exposing the reasons why such an Orpheus—the metaphor for high culture in general and poetry in particular—had not yet been produced by the Slovenes. Exposing a decidedly negative vision of Slovenian history, consisting of nothing but foreign invasions and internal disputes ("the roar of tempests o'er a home unkind"), he maintained that it was the lack of glorious deeds that had hindered the flourishing of poetry.

But, he went on in the next sonnets, there was still hope for the renewal of Slovenian poetry and thus for the coming of an Orpheus that would unify all the nation with his gentle singing: Julija only had to "send rays from her eyes for their glory to renew". Prešeren's message was clear: if Julija accepted his advances, she would become the muse inspiring solemn poems which would bring a new high culture to the Slovenes and thus make them a nation again.

== Legacy ==
The work was translated into Russian in 1889, which had great influence on many poets, including Valery Bryusov.

== Reception ==
The poem was recognized as a masterpiece by Matija Čop, but it did not gain much recognition beyond the small circle around the Kranjska čbelica magazine. Moreover, Julija was unimpressed. Understandably, Prešeren moved to more bitter verses.
