= Deborah Warren (writer) =

American poet

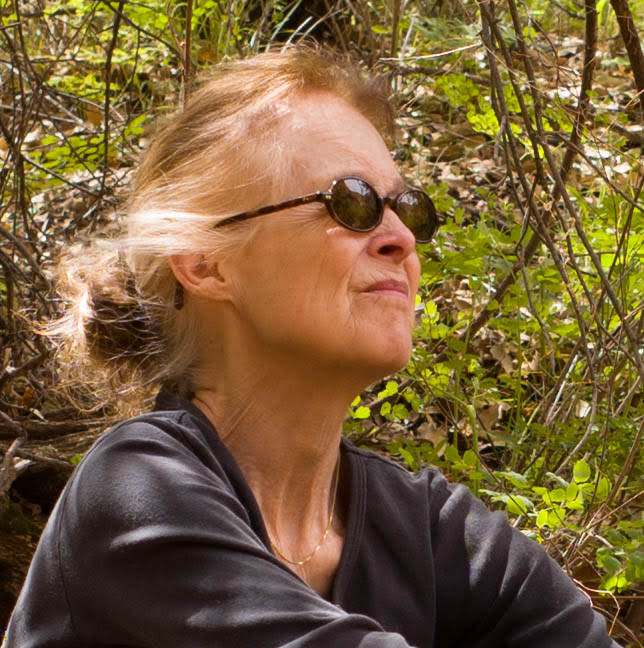
- Born: November 9, 1946 (age 79); Boston, Massachusetts, U.S.
- Education: Harvard University (A.B.)
- Occupation: Writer
- Writing career
- Notable awards: Robert Frost Award (2002); Richard Wilbur Award (2008)

Deborah Warren (born 1946, in Boston) is an American writer.

She graduated from Harvard University, with an A.B. in English. She was a Latin and English teacher before becoming a software engineering manager.

Her work has appeared in The New Yorker, The Paris Review, Poetry, and The Yale Review.

She lives in Massachusetts with her husband.

== Awards ==
- 2000 Robert Penn Warren Prize
- 2000 T. S. Eliot Prize of Truman State University (finalist)
- 2001 Howard Nemerov Sonnet Award
- 2002 Robert Frost Award
- 2003 New Criterion Poetry Prize
- 2008 Richard Wilbur Award for publication of Dream with Flowers and Bowl of Fruit
- 2018 Meringoff Award

== Books ==
Her books include:

- The Size of Happiness. Waywiser Press. 2003. ISBN 978-1-904130-04-8.
- Zero Meridian: Poems. Ivan R. Dee. 2004. ISBN 978-1-56663-596-7.
- Dream with Flowers and Bowl of Fruit. University of Evansville Press. 2008. ISBN 978-0-930982-66-9.
- Ausonius: Moselle, Epigrams, and Other Poems. Routledge. 2016. ISBN 978-1138857780.
- Connoisseurs of Worms. Paul Dry. 2021.
- Strange to Say: Etymology for Serious Entertainment. Paul Dry. 2021.
- Street Smarts: From Footpath to Freeway - A Miscellany. Paul Dry. 2026.
- Weird and Shocking Facts About Famous Figures. Skyhorse. 2024.
