= Heidi Lynn Staples =

American poet

Heidi Lynn Staples (1971) is a U.S. experimental writer. Her debut collection, Guess Can Gallop (New Issues, 2004) won the New Issues Poetry Prize. She is also the author of Dog Girl (Ahsahta Press, 2007), Take Care Fake Bear Torque Cake, A Memoir, which includes her illustrations (Caketrain, 2012), Noise Event (Ahsahta Press, 2013), and A**A*A*A (Ahsahta Press, 2018). Her poetry has appeared in the Best American Poetry, Chicago Review, Denver Quarterly, Ploughshares, Women's Studies Quarterly, and elsewhere.

Along with the poet Amy King, she co-founded Poets for Living Waters, a digital commemoration of the international response to the BP oil disaster in the Gulf of Mexico, and edited Big Energy Poets: When Ecopoetry Thinks Climate Change. Previously an Assistant Professor of English and Writing Center Director at Piedmont College in Athens, Georgia, in the fall of 2014, she joined the faculty of the University of Alabama, where she is an Associate Professor of English and Creative Writing.
