= Mayo Street Arts =

Community center in the United States

Coordinates: 43°39′46″N 70°15′16″W

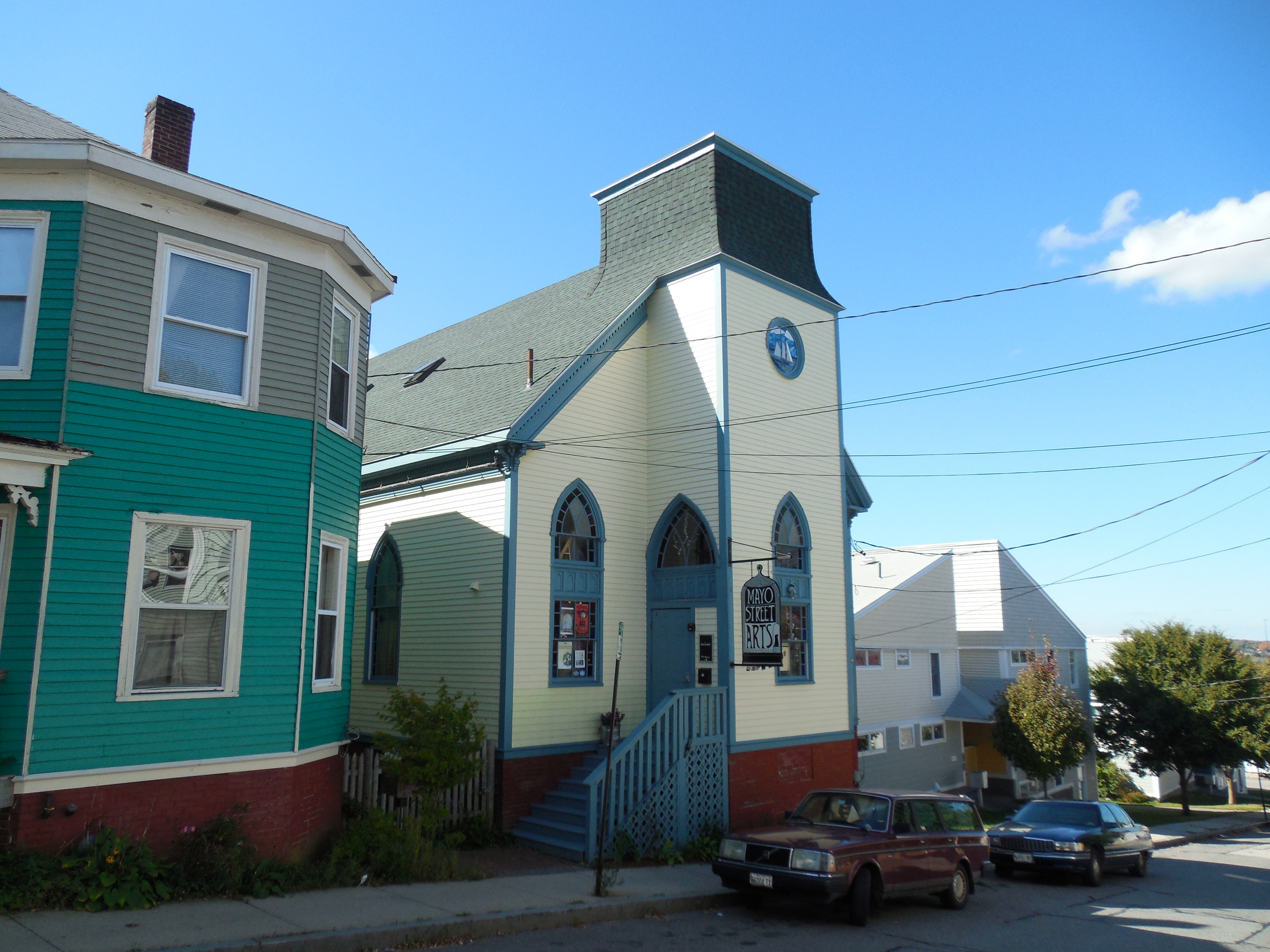
Mayo Street Arts

Mayo Street Arts is a community arts and performance venue in the East Bayside neighborhood of Portland, Maine. It was founded in 2010 by Blainor McGough after leasing the building which was formerly St. Ansgar Church. Mayo Street Arts' second executive director, Ian Bannon, succeeded McGough in May 2020 following McGough's resignation. Located next to Kennedy Park, a public housing development and close to many other public housing areas, Mayo Street Arts serves as a theater, concert venue, art gallery, and meeting space and offers affordable artist studios, rehearsal space, and a teaching platform for visual and performing artists of multicultural backgrounds. Programming is varied, but with a particular focus on puppetry, folk music, and dance.

One of Mayo Street Arts' first programs was the Children's Puppet Workshop, which incorporated Portland's professional artist community and many children of immigrant families which focuses on puppetry and story-telling.

Mayo Street Arts partners with a number of local organizations, including the East Bayside Neighborhood Association, Learning Works and the Maine College of Art. The venue, which has seating for 110 people, also hosts performances by local musicians who appreciate the building's natural acoustics.

Mayo Street Arts first leased the building on Mayo Street from Roxanne Quimby's charitable foundation, which had owned the building since 2007. It subsequently purchased the building in 2013, after receiving a donation from the Brooks Family Foundation.

Mayo Street Arts was supported the Virginia Somers Hodgkins Foundation in 2011, and in 2018 received a Stand for the Arts award for accessibility improvements.

In 2021, Mayo Street Arts was awarded its first grant from the National Endowment for the Arts (NEA) in the amount of $10,000 to support the creation of a Traditional Arts Network in collaboration with Cultural Resources. The Traditional Arts Network will be a resource for traditional artists who wish to preserve and share artistic and cultural practices of important newcomer groups in New England. The pilot year of the project will focus on the Rwandan, Congolese, Burundi, Somali, and Somali Bantu communities of Portland and Lewiston. This network will pool resources to offer support in marketing, grant-writing, documentation, video production, and access to rehearsal space.

As of June 2022, Mayo Street Arts is wheelchair accessible.
