= Lorrie Lynch =

Lorrie Lynch is a journalism educator and journalist. She was an editor and personalities columnist for USA Weekend. As of 2023, she works on the travel website for AARP: The Magazine.

== Biography ==
Lorrie Lynch graduated from Central Michigan University in 1975.

Lorrie Lynch interviewed entertainment figures and wrote the "Who's News" column in the Sunday magazine of USA Weekend. Lynch moved to USA Weekend from USA Today, where she had been a founding staff member.

Her coverage has been cited in biographies and references of celebrities including Oprah, George Clooney, and Stephenie Meyer.

=== Exploring Journalism and the Media ===
Lynch also is the author of the high school textbook Exploring Journalism and the Media. Emily Menke says, "The textbook provides a comprehensive overview of the journalistic process, the role of journalism and the essential skills needed for the field," praising the variety of information and teaching material presented, but noting the need for more detail of investigative journalism.

=== Teaching ===
Lynch has taught courses in celebrity journalism at Central Michigan University in Mount Pleasant.

== Awards ==
In 2007, she was placed in the CMU's College of Art and Media Hall of Fame.

== Bibliography ==
- Exploring Journalism and the Media (2009).

=== Books where she was the co-writer ===
- Telecourse Study Guide for Voices in Democracy: United States Government (1998)
- Telecourse Study Guide for The United States and Texas: Government Action(1998)
