= USA Weekend =

American weekend newspaper magazine

- USA Weekend cover from October 22, 2006; the top blank bar features a reproduction of the carrying newspaper's masthead.
- Categories: Sunday magazine
- Frequency: Weekly
- Circulation: Distributed to more than 800 newspapers nationwide
- Founded: 1953; 73 years ago (as Family Weekly)
- Final issue: December 28, 2014; 11 years ago
- Company: Gannett
- Country: United States
- Based in: McLean, Virginia
- Language: English
- Website: www.usaweekend.com

USA Weekend was an American weekend newspaper magazine published from 1953 to 2014.

Founded as Family Weekly, it was purchased in 1985 by the Gannett Company, which turned it into a sister publication to Gannett's flagship newspaper USA Today and distributed it in the Sunday editions of participating local newspapers. At its peak, USA Weekend was the country's second-largest national magazine supplement (behind Parade) and was distributed to more than 800 newspapers nationwide. Gannett ceased publication after the December 28, 2014, issue, citing a decline in print advertising and a company effort to minimize duplicative offerings.

== Overview ==
The publication was incorporated in 1953 as Family Weekly, a weekend magazine intended for distribution with newspapers. By the mid-1980s, it was carried in 362 newspapers nationwide for a total circulation of 12.8 million copies, making it the third-largest weekly magazine in the U.S., ranking behind its main competitor Parade (owned since 1976 by Advance Publications, which would sell it to Athlon Media Group in 2014) and TV Guide.

The Gannett Company purchased the magazine from CBS, Inc. on February 21, 1985. After the sale was finalized later that spring, Gannett renamed it USA Weekend and designated 1985 as its founding year for promotional purposes and anniversary observances. Most of the newspapers that Gannett owned soon carried USA Weekend within their Sunday editions as their default weekend magazine.

USA Weekend focused its articles on social issues, entertainment personalities and pop culture, health, food reviews and recipes, and travel. In addition to Parade, USA Weekend also competed alongside some Sunday magazines published for certain newspapers, such as The New York Times Magazine. The magazine also provided some newspapers with "Newspaper in Education" classroom guides for use by teachers.

=== Shutdown ===
On December 5, 2014, Gannett announced that it would cease publication of USA Weekend with the December 26–28, 2014, edition and lay off 30 advertising and editorial staffers. The shutdown was reportedly due to mounting distribution costs and a decline in advertising revenue (revenue for Sunday magazines through advertising buys had decreased by 10.9% year-over-year between the first two quarters of 2013 and the first half of 2014. USA Weekend lost up to $10 million in operating costs during the 2013 and 2014 fiscal years, which in previous years had resulted in the shift from the carrier newspapers paying a licensing fee to Gannett to publishers of these papers receiving a fee from the company for distributing USA Weekend (a structure that had also affected other syndicated Sunday magazines). As well, the supplement's circulation had declined, shrinking from the mid-2000s high of up to 70 million copies distributed through newsstand sales and home-delivery newspaper subscriptions down to around 18 million in 2014. For its final years of publication, the magazine had relied on writers and columnists from USA Today to help provide feature content for the magazine, after Gannett laid off several members of USA Weekend's writing staff.

The decision to cease publication of the supplement came one year after Gannett began distributing a seven-day-a-week supplement featuring condensed content from USA Today for syndication to the company's own local newspapers as well as partner newspapers owned by other publishers, with company executives said the supplement's Weekend Life section provided better content than USA Weekend. The end of USA Weekend left Parade as the only weekend newspaper magazine published in the United States. Parade, which had only appeared previously in acquired Gannett newspapers to fulfill contracts with previous owners, has now returned to many Gannett newspapers as a replacement for USA Weekend.

== Columns ==
Columns and contributors featured in USA Weekend included:

- CookSmart – a recipe column written by Ellie Krieger
- EatSmart – a food column by Jean Carper, focusing on healthy recipes and tips
- HealthSmart – a health information column written by the hosts of The Doctors
- MoneySmart – a financial advice column written by Sharon Epperson and Walecia Konrad
- Who's News – a column focusing on newsmakers of the past week, written by Lorrie Lynch
- Wit&Wisdom – a feature focusing on humor and insight, written by Terry Stickels

Other notable contributors included:

- Ken Burns
- Steven V. Roberts
- Cokie Roberts
- Tavis Smiley

== Make a Difference Day ==
In 1992, USA Weekend's Make a Difference Day created an annual community service event, held on the fourth Saturday of October.

At the 2013 event, the company gave 14 community groups $10,000 to donate to their local charities.
