= Richard Wilbur Award =

American poetry award

- Description: Award for unpublished poetry collections
- Country: United States
- Presented by: University of Evansville Press
- Website: www.evansville.edu/u-e-press/wilbur-award.cfm

The Richard Wilbur Award is an American poetry award and publishing prize given by University of Evansville in Indiana. It is named in honor of the American poet Richard Wilbur (Note: U.S. Poet Laureate and two time Pulitzer Prize winner.) and was established by William Baer, a professor at the University of Evansville. This biennial competition (awarded in even-numbered years) amongst all American poets awards publication of the winning manuscript by the University of Evansville Press and a small monetary prize.

Open to all American poets, except previous Wilbur Award winners, the contest is "[n]amed in honor of the distinguished American poet Richard Wilbur, and welcomes submissions of unpublished, original poetry collections (public domain or permission-secured translations may comprise up to one-third of the manuscript). ... Winning manuscripts will reflect the thoughtful humanity and careful metrical craftsmanship of Richard Wilbur's poetry." The 2019 contest is being judged by Ned Balbo. The award has an entry fee of $25 per manuscript, and the prize is $1000 plus publication. After the retirement of Dr. William Baer in 2015, Professor Rob Griffith became of the director of the competition.

The submissions are judged without knowing the identity of the contributors.

NPR journalist Michel Martin called it a "prestigious award". Journalist Julie Gunter in National Catholic Reporter considered the award to be "coveted".

The annual competition is conducted by the University of Evansville, is considered "prestigious", and attracts top shelf poets as judges.

== Winners ==
Source 1998-2007:

Year	Winner	Collection/Work	Ref(s)
1998	Robert Daseler	Levering Avenue	
1999	A. E. Stallings	Archaic Smile	
2000	Len Krisak	Even As We Speak	
2001	Rhina Espaillat	Rehearsing Absence	
2002	A. M. Juster	The Secret Language of Women	
2003	Thomas Carper	Distant Blue	
2004	Alfred Nicol	Winter Light	
2005	Chelsea Rathburn	The Shifting Line	
2006	Richard Wakefield	East of Early Winters	
2007	David Stephenson	Rhythm and Blues	
2008	Deborah Warren	Dream with Flowers and Bowl of Fruit	
2009	Susan McLean	The Best Disguise	
2010	Marion Shore	Sand Castle	
2011	Robert W. Crawford	The Empty Chair	
2012	William Bell	The Picnic in the Rain	
2013	Paul Lake	The Republic of Virtue	
2014	Maryann Corbett	Mid Evil	
2015	Midge Goldberg	Snowman's Code	
2016	Catherine Chandler	The Frangible Hour	
2017	Adam Tavel	Catafalque	
2018	Ned Balbo	3 Nights of the Perseids	
2019	Jehanne Dubrow	Simple Machines	
2020	Aaron Poochigian	American Divine	
2021	M.B. Smith	Midlife	
