= Jane Satterfield =

American poet

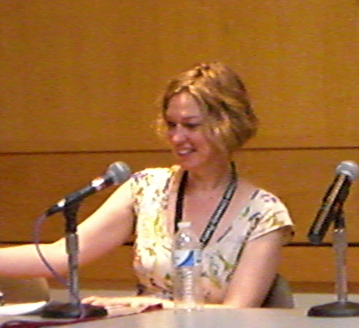
- Satterfield on the panel "Poets Who Write Other Genres" at the 2012 WCU Poetry Conference
- Born: July 15, 1964 (age 62)
- Education: University of Iowa '87, M.F.A.
- Occupations: poet, essayist, editor and professor
- Spouse: Ned Balbo
- Children: Catherine
- Writing career
- Genres: poetry, essay
- Notable awards: Ledbury Poetry Festival Competition, 2015. 49th Parallel Award for Poetry, Bellingham Review, 2013. Mslexia Women's Poetry Competition, 2011. National Endowment for the Arts Fellowship, 2007. Pirate’s Alley Faulkner Society Gold Medal for the Essay, 2007. Florida Review Editors’ Prize in Nonfiction, 2005. John Guyon Prize in Literary Nonfiction, 2000. Cuchulain Fellowship in Rhetoric for the Essay, Heekin Foundation, 1998.

Jane Satterfield is a British-American poet, essayist, editor, and professor. She is the recipient of a 2007 National Endowment for the Arts Literature Fellowship in poetry.

== Life ==
Jane Satterfield was born in Northamptonshire, England and raised in the United States. She is the daughter of an American serviceman and an Irish-English mother. Her mother had grown up in Corby, where she also gave birth to Satterfield.

Satterfield earned a Bachelor of Arts in English and Creative Writing from Loyola College (now Loyola University Maryland) in 1986. The following year, she received a Master of Fine Arts at the University of Iowa.

In 1994 Satterfield moved to England for a year as a result of her first husband's participation in the Fulbright Program. At this time she became pregnant with her daughter Catherine who was also born in England. Satterfield and Catherine's father eventually divorced. Until 2006, Satterfield raised her daughter largely as a single mother. Satterfield writes about this period in her life in Daughters of Empire: A Memoir of a Year in Britain and Beyond.

Satterfield became a tenured professor of writing at Loyola College in 2005. She currently lives in Baltimore, Maryland. Her husband is poet Ned Balbo.

Satterfield has served as Literary Editor for the Journal of Association for Research on Mothering since 2009.

== Reception ==
Satterfield has won a number of awards. In 2013 she received the 49th Parallel Award in Poetry from Bellingham Review. In 2011 she won the Mslexia Women's Poetry Competition for "The War Years". In 2007, Satterfield was awarded both a National Endowment for the Arts Fellowship in Literature for poetry and the Pirate's Alley Faulkner Society Gold Medal for the Essay.

In reviewing Satterfield's memoir Daughters of Empire, critic Rick Taylor of Elevate Difference writes that "the evocative power of her memory and the clarity of her language, she draws the reader willingly into this vortex". Critic Sondra Guttman notes that "Satterfield's approach is more scholarly than most... [and] brings a poet's eye and ear to the task of grappling with questions of gender, sexuality, and maternity". According to Susan McCallum-Smith in Belles Lettres, Satterfield describes "the terrifying vortex of new motherhood...where one's body is a foreign country, where sensual and creative energies are smothered, constricted, then transformed."

Reviewer Deborah L. Humphreys praised Satterfield's Assignation at Vanishing Point for being "so carefully arranged, there occasionally appears to be a sort of enjambment between several poems. A link between senses..." Nonetheless, Humphrey did comment that "the use of the historical figures in several of the poems was an obstacle in my reading. Did I need to know about the references, the lives or writings of saints, philosophers and others? Does the work stand on its own?... Was I missing an essential element or a level of richness?" By contrast, reviewer Allyson Shaw observed that Satterfield deftly incorporates "fragments from the lives of women writers from Simone de Beauvoir to Brontë. These bits of lost history are re-imagined in epistolary persona poems and lyric meditations, yet these voices are not just claimed; they are interrogated."

In reviewing Her Familiars Caitlin Doyle noted that "Satterfield's intense engagement with political and military matters marks a central difference between Her Familiars and her previous collections," adding, "She shines as a poet when drawing unique parallels across the centuries, placing surprising details in relation to each other so that her poems achieve a densely layered complexity."

== Bibliography ==
Satterfield has published five books of poetry, a memoir, and numerous essays. She is co-editor of the anthology Borderlands and Crossroads: Writing the Motherland.

=== Books ===
- 2000 — Shepherdess with an Automatic (Washington Writers’ Publishing House; winner of Towson University Prize for Literature)
- 2003 — Assignation at Vanishing Point (Elixir Press; winner of Third Annual Elixir Press Book Awards)
- 2009 — Daughters of Empire: A Memoir of a Year in Britain and Beyond (Demeter Press)
- 2013 — Her Familiars (Elixir Press)
- 2016 — Borderlands and Crossroads: Writing the Motherland (Demeter Press); Laurie Kruk, co-editor
- 2017 — Apocalypse Mix (Autumn House Press; winner of the Autumn House Press Poetry Prize)
- 2023 — The Badass Brontës (Diode Editions; winner of the Diode Editions Poetry Prize)

=== Essays ===
- 1998 — “The Disquieting Muses: Contemporary Poetry and Motherhood.” (The American Voice 45: 33–42)
- 1999 — "Another Country." (The Massachusetts Review 40.2: 56–62)
- 2000 — "Motherland." (Crab Orchard Review 6.1: 197–207; winner, John Guyon Award in Literary Nonfiction)
- 2001 — "Double Exposure." (Pennsylvania English 23.1/2: 144–154)
- 2002 — "Doors into Dark: Memory as Spectral Text." (Die Cast Garden Paraphysics Issue)
- 2003 — "The Crooked Track." (Die Cast Garden Groundfounds Issue)
- 2004 — "Assignations at Vanishing Point." (Seneca Review 34.1: 56–62)
- 2004 — "Daughters of Empire." (The Litchfield Review 1.2: 100–06)
- 2005 — "Knowhere, UK." (Florida Review 30.2 39–45; awarded 2005 Editors’ Prize in Nonfiction)
- 2006 — "A Return." (Elixir 6)
- 2010 — “Lucifer Matches: Epistles and Other Conversations.” (Mentor and Muse: Essays from Poets to Poets, Carbondale, IL: Southern Indiana University Press: 188–196)
- 2013 — "A Place at the Table." (Baltimore Fishbowl 25 Sep 2013)
- 2016 — "Mother Tongue." (Superstition Review 17)
- 2016 — "Rescue." (Animal: a beast of a literary magazine 1 Sep 2016)
- 2018 — "Herd." (Hotel Amerika 16)
- 2018 — "The Scream." (Diagram 18.4)
