= David Stephenson (poet) =

American poet and engineer

- Education: Massachusetts Institute of Technology; University of Wisconsin
- Occupations: Poet; engineer
- Writing career
- Notable awards: Richard Wilbur Award (2007)

David Alan Stephenson, born February 1, 1959 in Moline, Illinois, is an American poet and engineer.

He graduated from the Massachusetts Institute of Technology with B.S. and M.S. degrees in mechanical engineering in 1981 and 1983 respectively, and from the University of Wisconsin with a Ph.D. in the same discipline in 1985.

His poems have appeared in California Quarterly, Edge City Review, The Formalist, Hellas, The Lyric, Pivot, and Slant. His seminal work, Rhythm and Blues, won the Richard Wilbur Award in 2007; this compelling work focused on post-industrial Americana, largely drawn from his Rust Belt upbringing.

His second collection, Wall of Sound, was published in 2022. His third collection, Secret Dance, was published by Cyberwit.net in 2026. Several of his poems have also appeared in formal poetry anthologies. He has edited Pulsebeat Poetry Journal, an on-line journal of poetry with a strong musical element, since 2021.

In engineering, Stephenson was an expert on metal cutting and machine tools who worked at General Motors, Third Wave Systems, D3 Vibrations, the University of Michigan, Fusion Coolant Systems, and Ford. He is best known for the reference work Metal Cutting Theory and Practice, which he co-authored with John S. Agapiou. He also published a number of technical papers in engineering journals and was the inventor or co-inventor on several US patents. He received a number of awards for his engineering work, from both the Society of Manufacturing Engineers (SME) and the American Society of Mechanical Engineers (ASME); these include the SME Outstanding Young Manufacturing Engineer Award in 1994, the ASME Blackall Machine Tool and Gage Award in 1994, and the ASME/SME M. Eugene Merchant Manufacturing Medal in 2004. He was elected to the SME College of Fellows in 2009. He retired from engineering in 2022.

He lives in Detroit, Michigan.

== Awards ==
- Margaret Haley Carpenter Prize
- Howard Nemerov Award six-time finalist
- Richard Wilbur Award (2007)
- SME Outstanding Young Manufacturing Engineer Award (1994)
- Blackall Machine Tool and Gage Award (1994)
- M. Eugene Merchant Manufacturing Medal (2004)

== Works ==
- "Bunker", Able Muse
- "One Piece at a Time", Autumn Sky Poetry Daily
- "Scar Tissue", Valparaiso Poetry Review
- Rhythm and Blues University of Evansville Press, January 1, 2008, ISBN 978-0-930982-65-2
- Metal Cutting Theory and Practice, 3rd Edition, CRC Press, March 24, 2016, ISBN 978-1-4665-8753-3 (with J. S. Agapiou)
- Wall of Sound, Kelsay Books, October 18, 2022, ISBN 978-1-63980-213-5
- Secret Dance, Cyberwit.net, February 19, 2026, ISBN 978-93-6354-966-1

== Reviews ==
This is a book you rush through as if on oiled tracks—and before you know it the ride is over. The joy of the trip is partly due to the straightforwardness of the poems— recognizable situations, narrative and idea easily expressed, lack of complicated rhetorical devices
