= Amy King =

American poet, essayist, and activist (born 1971)

- Born: August 4, 1971 (age 55); Baltimore, Maryland, United States
- Education: Towson University; State University of New York Buffalo; Brooklyn College
- Occupations: Poet, essayist, and activist

Amy King (born August 4, 1974) is an American poet, essayist, and activist.

== Early life and education ==
Born in Baltimore, Maryland, King grew up in Stone Mountain, Georgia and received her B.S. in English and women's studies from Towson University. She received her M.A. in American studies (poetics concentration) at State University of New York Buffalo, and an M.F.A. from Brooklyn College in creative writing.

== Career ==
Since 2003, King has taught English and creative writing at SUNY Nassau Community College.

King received the 2015 WNBA Award (Women's National Book Association). She also received The Feminist Press's "40 Under 40: The Future of Feminism" award in 2010 and the 2012 SUNY Chancellor's Award for Excellence in Scholarship and Creative Activities.

In 2016, Adam Fitzgerald named King "One of the 30 Poets You Should Be Reading", and she was listed as one of "13 New York Poets Changing the Lit Scene" by Civil Coping Mechanisms in March 2017.

She moderates the Women's Poetry Listserv (WOMPO). She also serves on The Offing Magazine's Advisory Board.

King has published five full-length poetry collections, including Antidotes for an Alibi (BlazeVOX Books, 2005), I’m the Man Who Loves You (BlazeVOX Books, 2007, Slaves to do These Things (BlazeVOX Books, 2009), I Want to Make You Safe (Litmus Press 2011) and The Missing Museum (Tarpaulin Sky Press 2016). She is co-editor of the anthology series Bettering American Poetry (Bettering Books) and, with Heidi Lynn Staples, the anthology, Big Energy Poets: Ecopoetry Thinks Climate Change (Blazevox Books 2017).

From 2010 – 2014, she co-edited the online response to the BP Gulf Oil Spill, Poets for Living Waters, with Heidi Lynn Staples and co-edited the PEN America Poetry Series with Ana Bozicevic in 2010. King founded and curated, from 2006, the Brooklyn-based reading series, The Stain of Poetry, until 2010.

== Activism ==
A founding member (2009) of the literary arts activist organization, Vida: Women in Literary Arts, King currently serves on the executive board and is the press officer and editor-in-chief of the VIDA Review. Known for its annual report on the rates of publication between male and female authors, in 2014, the VIDA Count expanded to include race, sexual orientation and writers with disabilities.

In March 2015, King publicly critiqued in her essay, "Why Are People So Invested in Kenneth Goldsmith?" University of Pennsylvania's adjunct lecturer Kenneth Goldsmith's controversial performance at RISD of his poem "The Body of Michael Brown".

In August 2015, King curated and contributed to a forum for Poetry Foundation that raised the question, "What Is Literary Activism?", which resulted in online debate about the merits of literary activism.

In 2016, she spoke out about the Swedish Academy's decision to award Bob Dylan the Nobel Prize in Literature.

== Awards ==
- 2000: MacArthur Scholarship for Poetry
- 2001: Pavement Saw Press Chapbook Award Series – “The People Instruments”
- 2015: THE MISSING MUSEUM – Tarpaulin Sky Book Prize

== Bibliography ==
=== Collections ===
- The People Instruments. Pavement Saw Press. 2001. ISBN 1-886350-56-6.
- The Citizen's Dilemma. Duration Press. 2003.
- Antidotes for an Alibi. BlazeVOX Books. 2005. ISBN 978-0975922750.
- I’m the Man Who Loves You. BlazeVOX Books. 2007. ISBN 978-1934289334.
- Slaves to do These Things. BlazeVOX Books. 2009. ISBN 978-1935402312.
- I Want to Make You Safe. Litmus Press. 2011. ISBN 978-1933959238.
- The Missing Museum. Tarpaulin Sky Press. 2016. ISBN 978-1939460080.

=== Editor ===
- Amy King, Vanessa Angelica Villarreal, Nikki Wallschlaeger, Sarah Clark, Airea D Matthews, Kenzie Allen, Eunsong Kim, Jason Koo, David Tomas Martinez, Hector Ramirez, Metta Sama, eds (2017). Bettering American Poetry 2015. Bettering Books. ISBN 978-0692830901.
- Heidi Lynn Staples, Amy King, ed. (2017). Big Energy Poets: Ecopoetry Thinks Climate Change. Blazevox Books. ISBN 978-1-60964-103-0.

=== Poems ===
- "String Theory". Boston Review. April 2013.
- "Understanding the Poem". Connotation Press. December 2013.
- "Wings of Desire". Poetry Magazine. January 2014.
- "FAME IS NOT SEXUALLY TRANSMITTED". Hyperallergic. February 2014.
- "WAKE BEFORE DAWN & SALT THE SEA". Dia: Readings in Contemporary Poetry. December 2015.
- "Two If By Land, I Do". Brooklyn Poets. June 2015.
- "Poem-A-Day – 'You Make the Culture'". USA Today. August 2015.
- "Perspective". Poetry Foundation. September 2016.
- “From Ellis Island” and “Imprison, Deport, Repeat". The Guardian. Summer 2017.
- "Ancient Sunlight". Academy of American Poets. August 2017.
- “All Sex All the Time” and “Feel Up the Light". Diagram. May 2020.

=== Essays ===
- "The What Else of Queer Poetry". Free Verse: A Journal of Contemporary Poetry & Politics. 2010.
- "On Alice Walker's 'The Color Purple'". PEN America. October 2012.
- "BEAUTY AND THE BEASTLY PO-BIZ".The Rumpus. July 2013.
- "Poetry: This Death Is Incomplete". Boston Review. July 2013.
- "Poets’ Roundtable on Person and Persona". Amy King and Cate Marvin. Los Angeles Review of Books. October 2013.
- "Whacked Out: A Case for the Advocacy of the Unlisted". Poetry Magazine. January 2014.
- "Threat Level: Poetry". Boston Review. February 2014.
- "WHY ARE PEOPLE SO INVESTED IN KENNETH GOLDSMITH? OR, IS COLONIALIST POETRY EASY?". VIDA Review. March 2015.
- "Call and Response: The Gifts of Women Poets". Poetry Foundation. August 2015.
- "Young Poets Bare All: What Is a Culture?". Poetry Foundation. August 2015.
- "What Is Literary Activism?". Poetry Foundation. August 2015.
- "And the Occasion Changed: A Tribute to John Ashbery". Poetry Foundation. September 2017.
