= Zalog pri Cerkljah =

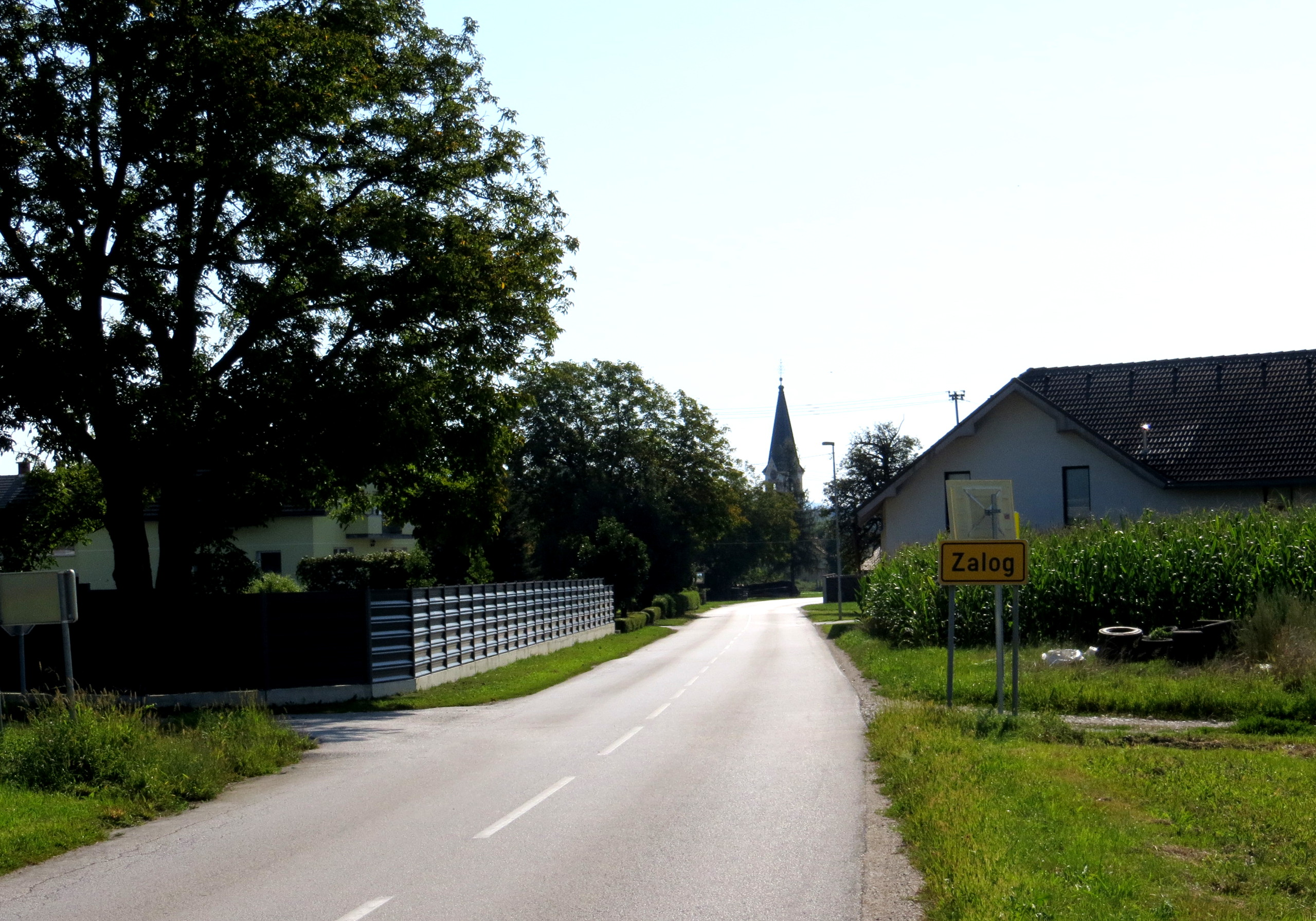

- Location in Slovenia
- Coordinates: 46°13′49.14″N 14°31′5.65″E
- Country: Slovenia
- Traditional Region: Upper Carniola
- Statistical region: Upper Carniola
- Municipality: Cerklje na Gorenjskem
- Elevation: 357.8 m (1,174 ft)

Population (2020)
  - Total: 547

Zalog pri Cerkljah (pronounced [ˈzaːlɔk pɾi tsɛɾˈkljax]; German: Salog) is a village in the Municipality of Cerklje na Gorenjskem in the Upper Carniola region of Slovenia. It includes the hamlets of Zgornji Zalog (German: Obersalog), Srednji Zalog (German: Mittersalog), Spodnji Zalog (German: Untersalog), Zgornja Trata, and Spodnja Trata.

== Name ==
The name of the settlement was changed from Zalog to Zalog pri Cerkljah in 1953. In the past the German name was Salog.

== Church ==
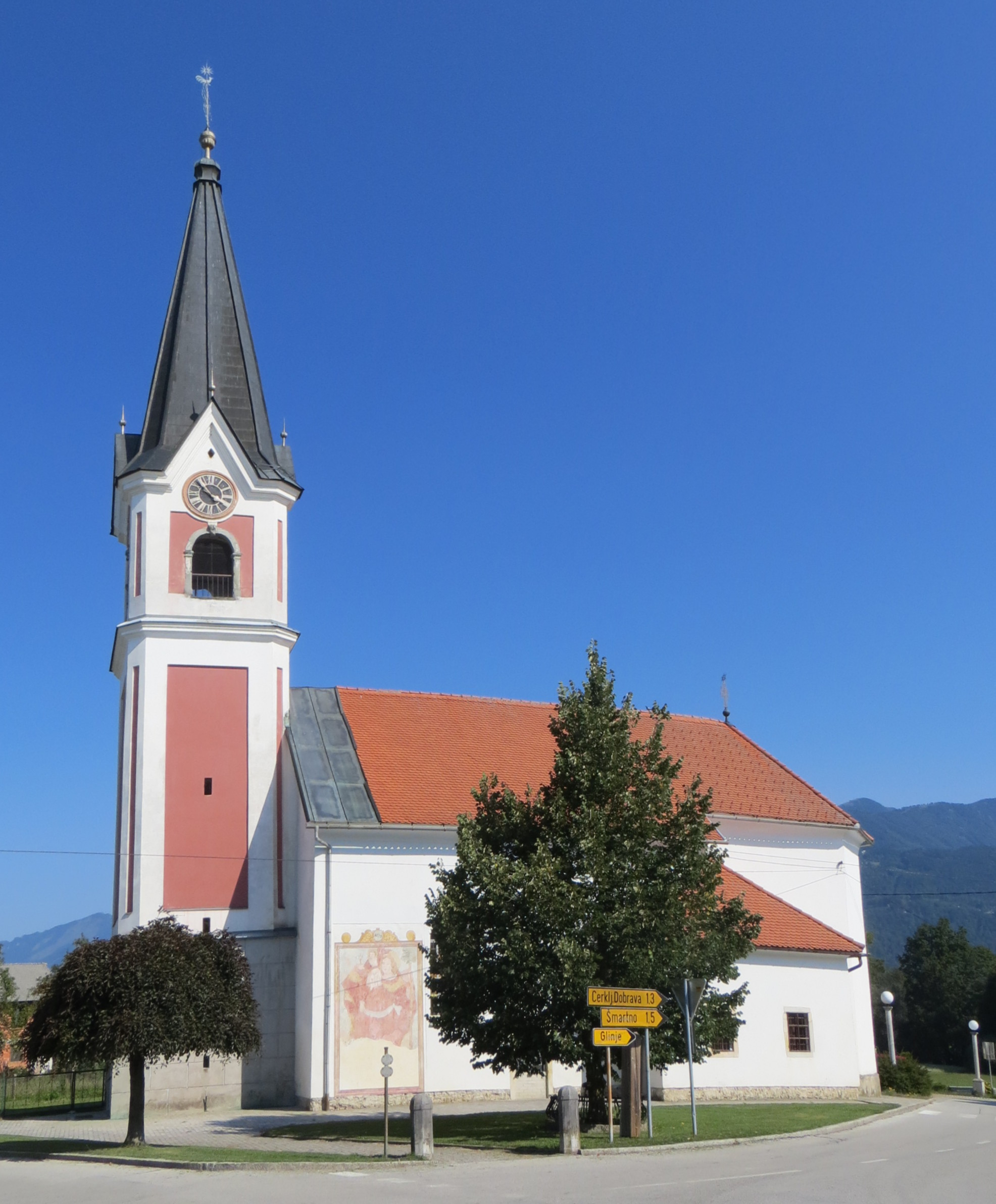
Saint Matthew's Church

The church in the hamlet of Zgornji Zalog is dedicated to Saint Matthew. The bell in the belfry is dated to 1434 and is the oldest known bell in the Archdiocese of Ljubljana.
