= Thomas Carper (poet) =

American poet

- Occupation: Poet
- Writing career
- Notable awards: Richard Wilbur Award (2003)

Thomas Carper is an American poet. His work has appeared in Poetry, The American Scholar, The Formalist, and The Review (London).

== Awards ==
- 2003 Richard Wilbur Award

== Works ==
- "The First-born", Beloit Poetry Journal 29 (Spring 1979), 7.
- Distant Blue, University of Evansville Press, October 2003, ISBN 978-0-930982-57-7
- From Nature, Johns Hopkins University Press, 1995, ISBN 978-0-8018-5208-4
- Fiddle Lane, Johns Hopkins University Press, 1991, ISBN 978-0-8018-4268-9
- Musicians: poems, Aralia Press, 1990
- Meter and meaning: an introduction to rhythm in poetry, Thomas Carper, Derek Attridge, Routledge, 2003, ISBN 978-0-415-31174-8

=== Anthologies ===
- The Maine Poets: An Anthology, Wesley McNair, editor, Down East Books, November 25, 2003, ISBN 978-0-89272-629-5
- "Turning in Bed"; "That's a Nice Leg", Words brushed by music: twenty-five years of the Johns Hopkins poetry series, Editor John T. Irwin, JHU Press, 2004, ISBN 978-0-8018-8029-2
