= David Stephenson (climatologist) =

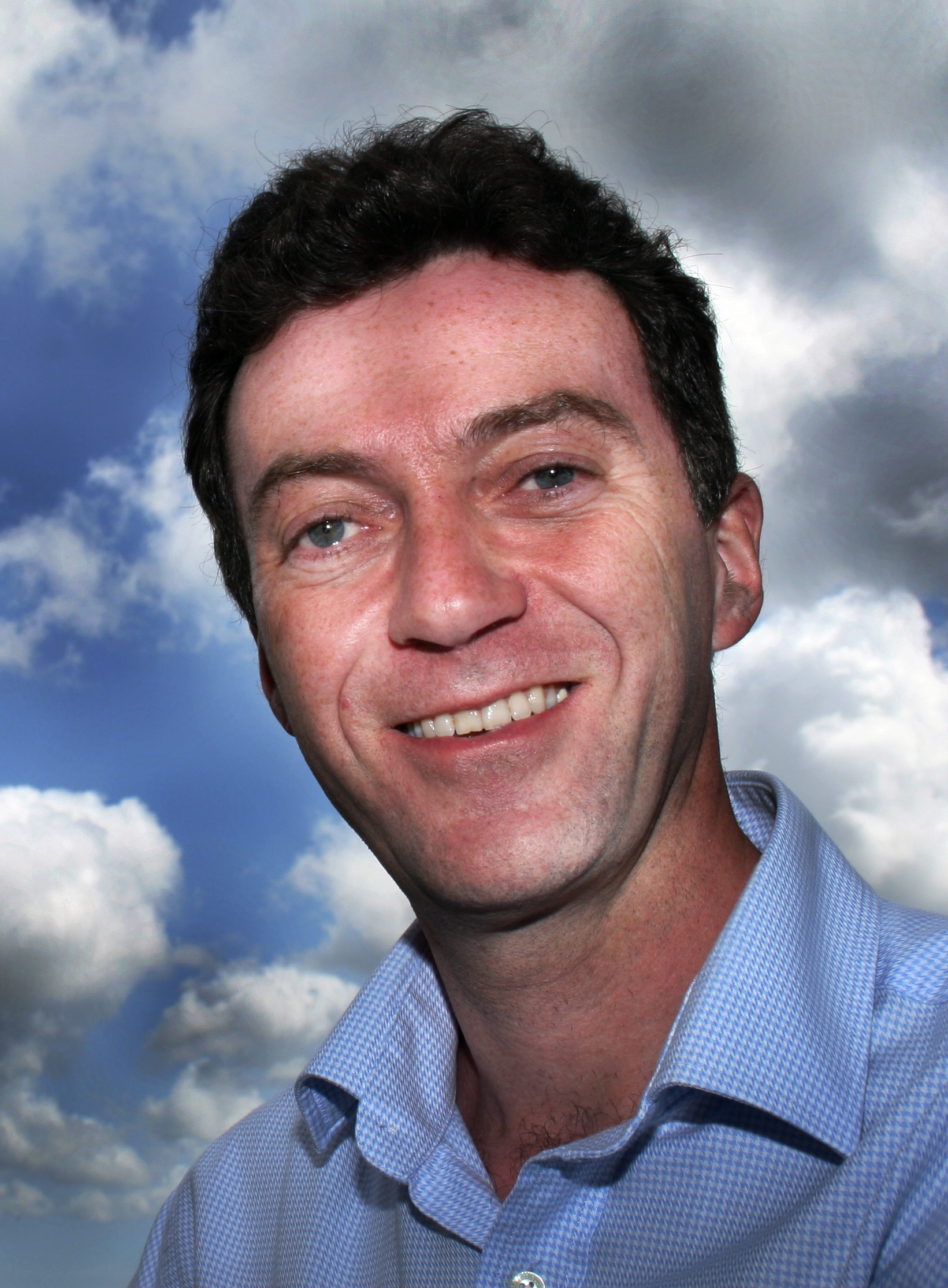

David B. Stephenson is a British academic and Professor of Statistical Climatology at the University of Exeter. He is known for his use of statistical modelling in atmospheric and climate science. He is the founder and director of the Exeter Climate Systems research centre and also the Head of Statistical Science at the University of Exeter.

He was one of the authors of Chapter 14 of Intergovernmental Panel on Climate Change's fifth assessment report. He is an elected member of the Academia Europaea.

Together with IT Joliffe, he edited Forecast verification: a practitioner's guide in atmospheric science (John Wiley & Sons, 2nd ed. 2012), which has been cited over 2200 times.

== Awards ==
- Royal Meteorological Society's Adrian Gill Award (2012)
- Royal Society Wolfson Research Merit Award (2015)

== Career ==
He received a 1st class Honours degree in Physics at Oxford University (1982-1985) and received a PhD in Theoretical Particle Physics from Edinburgh University (1982-1988) (supervised by Profs. Peter Higgs and Richard Kenway)
