= Jean Carper =

American journalist (born 1932)

- Born: Jean Elinor Carper; January 3, 1932 (age 94); Delaware, Ohio, U.S.
- Education: Ohio Wesleyan University
- Occupations: Author, medical journalist

Jean Carper (born January 3, 1932) is a New York Times best-selling author, an American medical journalist, contributing editor to USA Weekend, and author of 24 books.

== Early life and education ==
Jean Elinor Carper was born January 3, 1932, the daughter of Jethro and Natella Marie (Boyer) Carper, in Delaware, Ohio. She is a 1953 graduate of Ohio Wesleyan University in Delaware, Ohio, where she majored in speech and was a member of the debate team that won a state championship.

== Career ==
Carper was CNN's first medical correspondent when the network began in 1980. She has also appeared on the Today Show, Good Morning America and Dateline. For 14 years, she wrote a weekly column called "EatSmart" for Gannett’s Sunday supplement, USA Weekend. She has written for The Huffington Post about Alzheimer's disease, and produced an independent documentary on the disease, Monster in the Mind, in 2016.

Three of Carper's books have been on the New York Times best-seller list: Food: Your Miracle Medicine, in 1993; Stop Aging Now!, in 1995; and Miracle Cures: Dramatic New Scientific Discoveries Revealing the Healing Powers of Herbs, Vitamins, and Other Natural Remedies, in 1997. After the release of Stop Aging Now, her readers urged her to formulate an all-in-one multivitamin based on her research. By popular demand, she produced a multi-vitamin anti-aging formula in 1996, called Stop Aging Now! She sold the company in 2007 and is on the company's scientific advisory board.

Her success as a medical journalist has been credited to her ability to accurately translate research in ways understandable to the average person. Her books on health have been translated into 20 foreign languages and are still sold and read throughout the world.

== Selected publications ==
Carper is the author of 24 books, mostly on nutrition, health, and natural remedies, including two cookbooks.

- Stay Alive! (1965) LCCN 65-22579
- Bitter Greetings (1967) ASIN B0007DE2ZE
- The Dark Side of the Marketplace, co-authored with Senator Warren Magnuson (1968) ASIN B000QLKO1I
- Eating May Be Hazardous to Your Health (1972) ISBN 978-0385111935
- The Food Pharmacy (1989) ISBN 978-0553345247
- Stop Aging Now! (1996) ISBN 978-0060985004
- Miracle Cures (1998) ISBN 978-0060984366
- Food: Your Miracle Medicine (1994) ISBN 978-0060984243
- Your Miracle Brain (2002) ISBN 978-0060984403
- Eatsmart: The Nutrition Cookbook You Can't Live Without (2004) ISBN 978-0975870204
- Jean Carper's Complete Healthy Cookbook (2007) ISBN 978-1569243268
- 100 Simple Things You Can Do to Prevent Alzheimer's (2010) ISBN 978-0316086851

== Awards ==
Carper won the 1995 Excellence in Journalism Award from the American Aging Association.

Ohio Wesleyan University awarded her a Distinguished Achievement Citation in 1999, recognizing her work as a "major force in enlightening the public about the latest scientific discoveries involving diet, food, and vitamins as causes and cures of our modern epidemic of chronic diseases, including heart disease and cancer."

In 2014, she was inducted into The Ohio Foundation of Independent Colleges Hall of Excellence.
