= David Stevenson (Hibernian footballer) =

Scottish footballer

Personal information
- Full name: David Stevenson
- Place of birth: Newhaven, Scotland
- Position: Goalkeeper

Senior career*
Years	Team	Apps	(Gls)
1913–1914	Leith Athletic	17	(0)
1914–1922	Hibernian	35	(0)
1915–1916	→ Lochgelly United (loan)		
1920–1921	→ St Bernard's (loan)	1	(0)
1922–1923	Bo'ness	34	(0)
1923–1927	Cowdenbeath	52	(0)
1927–1928	Dunfermline Athletic	16	(0)
- * Club domestic league appearances and goals

David Stevenson was a Scottish professional footballer who played in the Scottish League for Cowdenbeath, Hibernian, Bo'ness, Leith Athletic and Dunfermline Athletic as a goalkeeper.

== Personal life ==
Stevenson enlisted in the British Army during the First World War.

== Career statistics ==
Appearances and goals by club, season and competition
Club	Season	League			National Cup		Total	
Club	Season	Division	Apps	Goals	Apps	Goals	Apps	Goals
Leith Athletic	1913–14	Scottish Division Two	17	0	8	0	25	0
Hibernian	1913–14	Scottish Division One	2	0	—		2	0
Hibernian	1914–15	Scottish Division One	5	0	—		5	0
Hibernian	1918–19	Scottish Division One	7	0	—		7	0
Hibernian	1919–20	Scottish Division One	21	0	0	0	21	0
Hibernian	Total		35	0	0	0	35	0
St Bernard's (loan)	1920–21	Central League	1	0	—		1	0
Bo'ness	1922–23	Scottish Division Two	34	0	4	0	28	0
Cowdenbeath	1923–24	Scottish Division Two	27	0	2	0	29	0
Cowdenbeath	1924–25	Scottish Division One	24	0	1	0	25	0
Cowdenbeath	1925–26	Scottish Division One	1	0	0	0	1	0
Cowdenbeath	Total		52	0	3	0	55	0
Dunfermline Athletic	1926–27	Scottish Division One	7	0	3	0	10	0
Dunfermline Athletic	1927–28	Scottish Division One	9	0	0	0	9	0
Dunfermline Athletic	Total		16	0	3	0	19	0
Career total			155	0	10	0	165	0
