= Kennedy Park (Portland, Maine) =

Neighborhood in Portland, Maine, U.S.

Coordinates: 43°39′54.1″N 70°15′23.0″W

Kennedy Park is a neighborhood in East Bayside in downtown Portland, Maine, built around a park, athletic fields, basketball courts, a playground and the Boyd Street Urban Garden.

== Demographics ==
The neighborhood is part of Census Tract 5, the most diverse neighborhood in the state of Maine. While the White population of Maine was 97% according to the 2000 census, the White population in Census Tract 5 was only 71%. According to the 2010 census, Census Tract 5 is the most diverse section of Portland, Maine. It is 60% White, 21% Black, 6% Hispanic, 8% Asian, 1% Native American, and 4% Multiracial.

== History ==
Kennedy Park was built in 1964–1965 as a public housing project after much of the neighborhood's historic housing was torn down during controversial slum clearing and urban renewal policies that led to the creation of the city's historic preservation entity, Greater Portland Landmarks. In 1958, Portland's Slum Clearance and Redevelopment Administration demolished 54 housing units in the tight knit immigrant neighborhood, which fragmented the mostly Italian and Jewish communities. Later 100 housing units were demolished along the historic Franklin Street, which was turned into a two-lane highway that truncated streets and still divides the city.

The park is named after President of the United States, John F. Kennedy. There are 160 rental units. During its first few decades, the neighborhood was known for crime and drugs. However, in recent years, the police have reported significantly less crime in the area. From the 1980s onward, the neighborhood's demographic began changing; common ethnicities in 2001 were "Thai, Korean, Cambodian, Japanese, American, Somali, Spanish, Vietnamese, Indonesian, Eritrean, Ethiopian etc..."

By the 2010s, the industrial properties in the neighborhood began to be converted into breweries, coffee roasting facilities, restaurants and art galleries. New condos have been built. The noise from live music and events has caused noise complaints from neighbors. On the 4th of July in 2021 and 2022, police officers were attacked by fireworks in the neighborhood while responding to calls involving gun shots and shootings. The police said the majority of people at the scene were not neighborhood residents. The 2022 incident occurred in the vicinity of an intersection of neighborhood streets that were rendered dead ends from the slum clearance and redevelopment circa 1950s-1960s.

== Location ==
Situated in the East Bayside neighborhood, Kennedy Park is close to Franklin Street. Local schools are Portland High School and East End Community School. Franklin Towers, Maine's tallest residential building, is located nearby as well.

== See also ==
- History of the Somalis in Maine
