= Trata pri Velesovem =

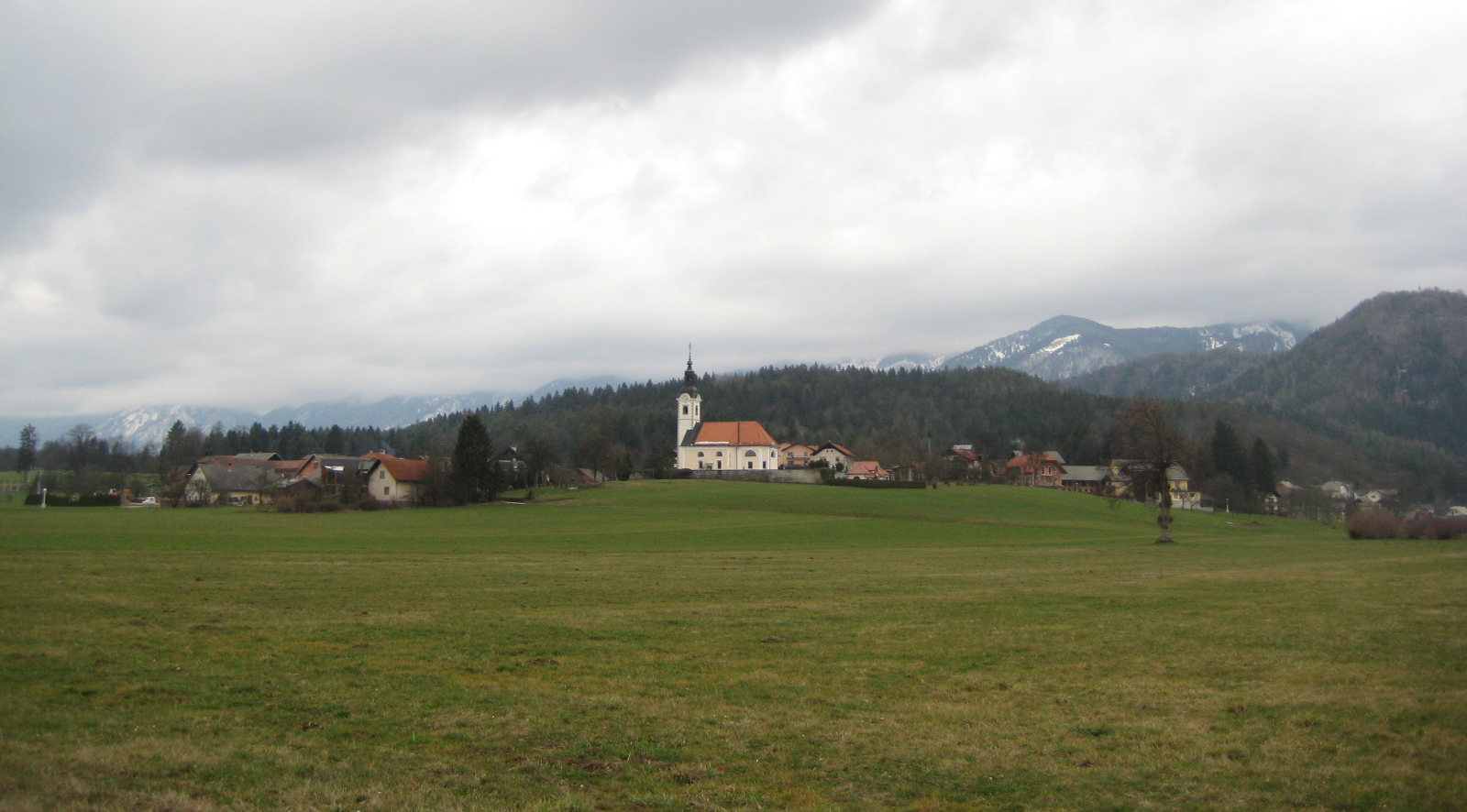

- Location in Slovenia
- Coordinates: 46°15′58.75″N 14°27′38.56″E
- Country: Slovenia
- Traditional Region: Upper Carniola
- Statistical region: Upper Carniola
- Municipality: Cerklje na Gorenjskem
- Elevation: 426.8 m (1,400 ft)

Population (2020)
  - Total: 127

Trata pri Velesovem (pronounced [ˈtɾaːta pɾi ʋɛˈleːsɔʋɛm]) is a village in the Municipality of Cerklje na Gorenjskem in the Upper Carniola region of Slovenia.

== Name ==
The name of the settlement was changed from Trata to Trata pri Velesovem in 1953.

== Church ==
The Baroque church in the village is dedicated to Saint Margaret.

== Notable people ==
Notable people that were born or lived in Trata pri Velesovem include:

- Jože Šerjak (1918–1945), writer and poet
