= Radna, Sevnica =

Radna
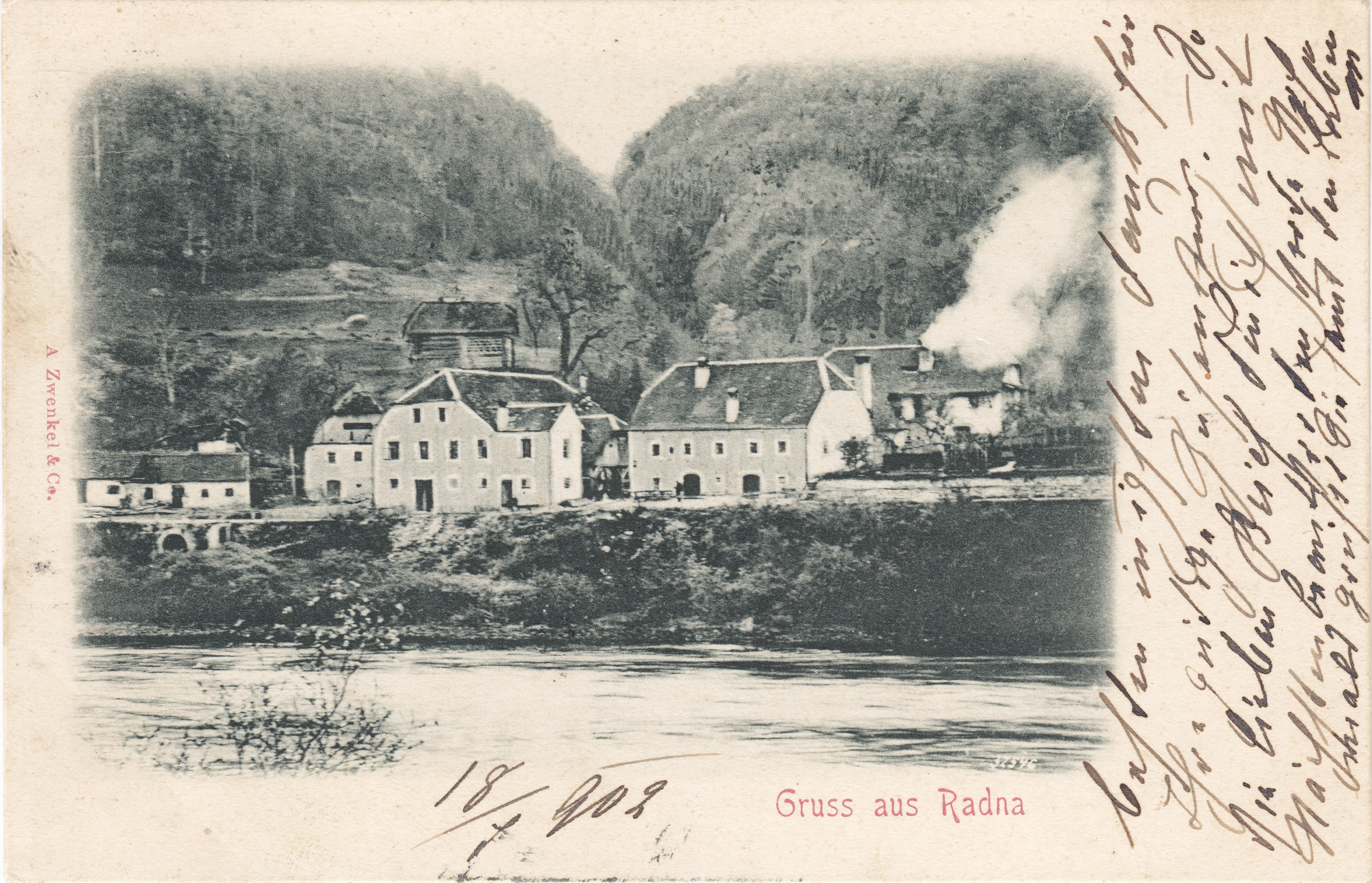
- 1902 postcard of Radna

- Location in Slovenia
- Coordinates: 46°0′13.76″N 15°18′7.19″E
- Country: Slovenia
- Traditional region: Lower Carniola
- Statistical region: Lower Sava
- Municipality: Sevnica

Area
  - Total: 0.72 km^{2} (0.28 sq mi)
- Elevation: 180.5 m (592 ft)

Population (2002)
  - Total: 68

Radna (pronounced [ˈɾaːdna]) is a settlement in the Municipality of Sevnica in east-central Slovenia. It lies at the confluence of the Mirna River and the Sava River in the historical region of Lower Carniola. The municipality is now included in the Lower Sava Statistical Region.

The village was historically named Tariška vas. There is a large 17th-century mansion in the settlement.
