= Susan M. Schultz =

American poet

Susan M. Schultz (born 1958) is an American poet, critic, publisher and English professor at the University of Hawaii at Manoa. She specializes in modern and contemporary poetry, American literature, and creative writing. She moved from Virginia to Honolulu in 1990.

== Biography ==
She was born in Belleville, Illinois, and lives in Kāne'ohe, Hawaii. She is author of three collections of poems, Aleatory Allegories (Salt, 2000), Memory Cards & Adoption Papers (Potes & Poets, 2001) And then something happened (Salt, 2004), a critical book, A Poetics of Impasse in Modern and Contemporary American Poetry (University of Alabama Press, 2005), and editor of The Tribe of John: Ashbery and Contemporary Poetry (University of Alabama Press, 1995). Her poetry chapbooks include Another Child, Earthquake Dreams, Voice-overs (with John Kinsella), and Addenda.

In 1995, Schultz founded Tinfish Press, a paper and electronic journal and publisher of experimental poetry from the Pacific region (including Hawai`i, New Zealand/Aotearoa, Australia, California and western Canada), and of a series of Tinfish Network chapbooks. Authors published include Barbara Jane Reyes, Yunte Huang and Linh Dinh. Ron Silliman has written about her:

Schultz is somebody who really gets it as to how parables work & what their potential might be for writing. First, her poems have the precision of the best analytic philosophy. Second, she understands that the dynamics of the parable must play out in the referential world. Typically, poets who focus on the latter forget the importance of the former & a few of those who get the former tend to neglect the gears of causality in the latter. Schultz gets all of it & does so with a wit & tenderness that made me stop just to wonder at it all.

Schultz has also published critical articles and review essays on Hart Crane, Laura Riding, Gertrude Stein, John Ashbery, Charles Bernstein, Ann Lauterbach, Lois-Ann Yamanaka, and others.

In 1992, she was made president of Hawai'i Literary Arts Council.
