= Lesley Wheeler =

American poet and literary scholar

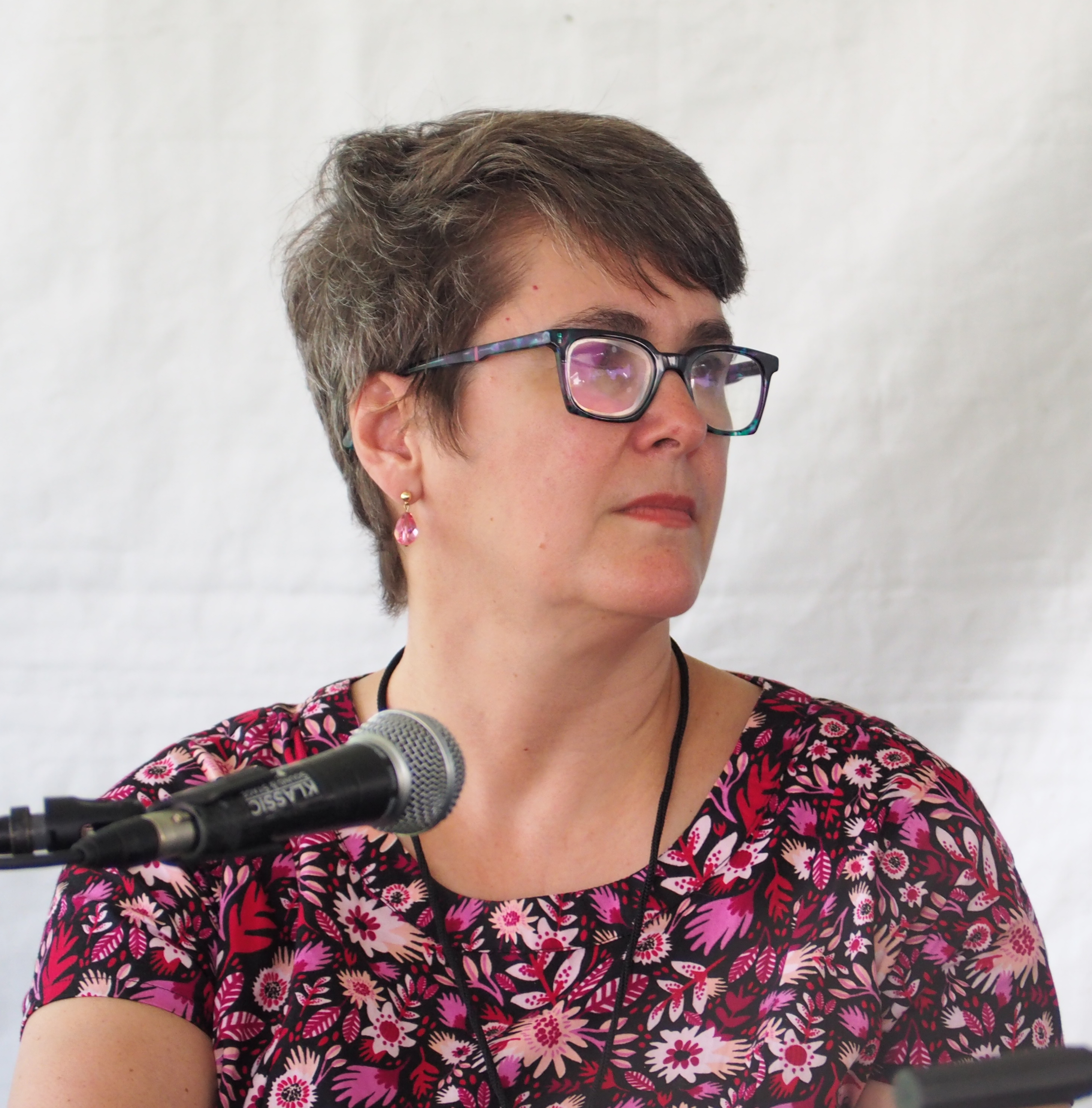

Academic background
- Education: Princeton University; Rutgers University

Academic work
- Discipline: literary criticism
- Institutions: Washington and Lee University
- Website: https://lesleywheeler.org/about/

Lesley Wheeler is an American poet and literary scholar. She is the Henry S. Fox Professor of English at Washington and Lee University.

== Education and career ==
Wheeler was born in Baldwin, New York. She earned her bachelor's degree from Rutgers University and her Ph.D. from Princeton University. She is currently the Henry S. Fox Professor of English at Washington and Lee University in Lexington, Virginia.

In 2015, Wheeler joined the board of trustees of the Association of Writers & Writing Programs as the Mid Atlantic Regional Council Chair.

== Works ==
Wheeler has published four books of poetry: Radioland (Barrow Street 2015), The Receptionist and Other Tales (Aqueduct 2012), Heterotopia (Barrow Street 2010), and Heathen (C&R 2009).

She has published two books of literary scholarship: Voicing American Poetry: Sound and Performance from the 1920s to the Present (Cornell UP 2008) and The Poetics of Enclosure: American Women Poets from Dickinson to Dove (U of Tennessee P 2002) She also co-edited the collection Letters to the World: Poems from Members of the Women's Poetry Listserv (Red Hen 2008).

Her works have been reviewed in Poets’ Quarterly, Salamander, Takahē, Strange Horizons, Poet Lore, Rattle, Kestrel, New Pages, Verse Wisconsin, Yanaguana Literary Review, Blackbird, Mid-American Review, Calyx, Junctures, Prairie Schooner, and other venues.

== Honors ==
- Virginia Center for the Creative Arts Fellowship (2013)
- Tiptree Award Honor List (2013)
- Outstanding Faculty Award from the State Council of Higher Education in Virginia (2012)
- Fulbright Senior Scholar, New Zealand (2011)
- Barrow Street Press Poetry Prize (2010)
- Library of Virginia Award finalist (2010)
- Virginia Commission for the Arts, Individual Artist Fellowship in Poetry (2007)
- National Endowment for the Humanities Fellowship (2005)

== Selected bibliography ==
=== Poetry ===
- Radioland (Barrow Street 2015) ISBN 9780989329682
- The Receptionist and Other Tales (Aqueduct 2012) ISBN 9781619760127
- Heterotopia (Barrow Street 2010) ISBN 9780981987620
- Heathen (C&R 2009) ISBN 9780981501093

=== Academic works ===
- Voicing American Poetry: Sound and Performance from the 1920s to the Present. (Cornell University Press, 2008) ISBN 9780801446689
- The poetics of enclosure: American women poets from Dickinson to Dove. (University of Tennessee Press, 2002) ISBN 9781572331976
