= Formalism (philosophy) =

Concept of focusing on form over concept

The term formalism describes an emphasis on form over content or meaning in the arts, literature, or philosophy. A practitioner of formalism is called a formalist. A formalist, with respect to some discipline, holds that there is no transcendent meaning to that discipline other than the literal content created by a practitioner. For example, formalists within mathematics claim that mathematics is no more than the symbols written down by the mathematician, which is based on logic and a few elementary rules alone. This is as opposed to non-formalists in that field, who hold that there are some things inherently true, and they are not necessarily dependent on the symbols within mathematics so much as a greater truth. Formalists within a discipline are completely concerned with "the rules of the game," as there is no other external truth that can be achieved beyond those given rules. In this sense, formalism lends itself well to disciplines based upon axiomatic systems.

== Religion ==
Formalism in religion means an emphasis on ritual and observance over their meanings. Within Christianity, the term legalism is a derogatory term that is loosely synonymous to religious formalism.

== Law ==
Formalism is a school of thought in law and jurisprudence which assumes that the law is a system of rules that can determine the outcome of any case, without reference to external norms. For example, formalism animates the commonly heard criticism that "judges should apply the law, not make it." To formalism's rival, legal realism, this criticism is incoherent, because legal realism assumes that, at least in difficult cases, all applications of the law will require that a judge refer to external (i.e. non-legal) sources, such as the judge's conception of justice, or commercial norms.

== Criticism ==
In general in the study of the arts and literature, formalism refers to the style of criticism that focuses on artistic or literary techniques in themselves, in separation from the work's social and historical context.

=== Art criticism ===
Generally speaking, formalism is the concept which everything necessary in a work of art is contained within it. The context for the work, including the reason for its creation, the historical background, and the life of the artist, is not considered to be significant. Examples of formalist aestheticians are Clive Bell, Jerome Stolnitz, and Edward Bullough.

=== Literary criticism ===
In contemporary discussions of literary theory, the school of criticism of I. A. Richards and his followers, traditionally the New Criticism, has sometimes been labelled 'formalist'. The formalist approach, in this sense, is a continuation of aspects of classical rhetoric.

Russian formalism was a twentieth century school, based in Eastern Europe, with roots in linguistic studies and also theorizing on fairy tales, in which content is taken as secondary since the tale 'is' the form, the princess 'is' the fairy-tale princess.

== The arts ==
=== Poetry ===
In modern poetry, Formalist poets may be considered as the opposite of writers of free verse. These are only labels and rarely sum up matters satisfactorily. 'Formalism' in poetry represents an attachment to poetry that recognizes and uses schemes of rhyme and rhythm to create poetic effects and to innovate. To distinguish it from archaic poetry the term 'neo-formalist' is sometimes used.

See for example:

- The Formalist, a literary magazine (now defunct) for formalist poetry
- New Formalism, a movement within the poetry of the United States
- The New Formalist, a literary magazine for formalist poetry. It was published from 2001 to 2010.

=== Film ===
In film studies, formalism is a trait in filmmaking, which overtly uses the language of film, such as editing, shot composition, camera movement, set design, etc., so as to emphasize graphical (as opposed to diegetic) qualities of the image. Strict formalism, condemned by realist film theorists such as André Bazin, has declined substantially in popular usage since the 1950s, though some more postmodern filmmakers reference it to suggest the artificiality of the film experience.

Examples of formalist films may include Resnais's Last Year at Marienbad and Parajanov's The Color of Pomegranates.

== Intellectual method ==
Formalism can be applied to a set of notations and rules for manipulating them which yield results in agreement with experiment or other techniques of calculation. These rules and notations may or may not have a corresponding mathematical semantics. In the case no mathematical semantics exists, the calculations are often said to be purely formal. See for example scientific formalism.

== Mathematics ==
In the foundations of mathematics, formalism is associated with a certain rigorous mathematical method: see formal system. In common usage, a formalism means the out-turn of the effort towards formalization of a given limited area. In other words, matters can be formally discussed once captured in a formal system, or commonly enough within something formalizable with claims to be one. Complete formalization is in the domain of computer science.

Formalism also more precisely refers to a certain school in the philosophy of mathematics, stressing axiomatic proofs through theorems, specifically associated with David Hilbert. In the philosophy of mathematics, therefore, a formalist is a person who belongs to the school of formalism, which is a certain mathematical-philosophical doctrine descending from Hilbert.

== Anthropology ==
In economic anthropology, formalism is the theoretical perspective that the principles of neoclassical economics can be applied to our understanding of all human societies.

== See also ==
- Zhdanov Doctrine, "anti-formalist" doctrine leading to purges in the arts and culture of the USSR and satellite states
