= Goethe's Faust =

Play by Johann Wolfgang von Goethe

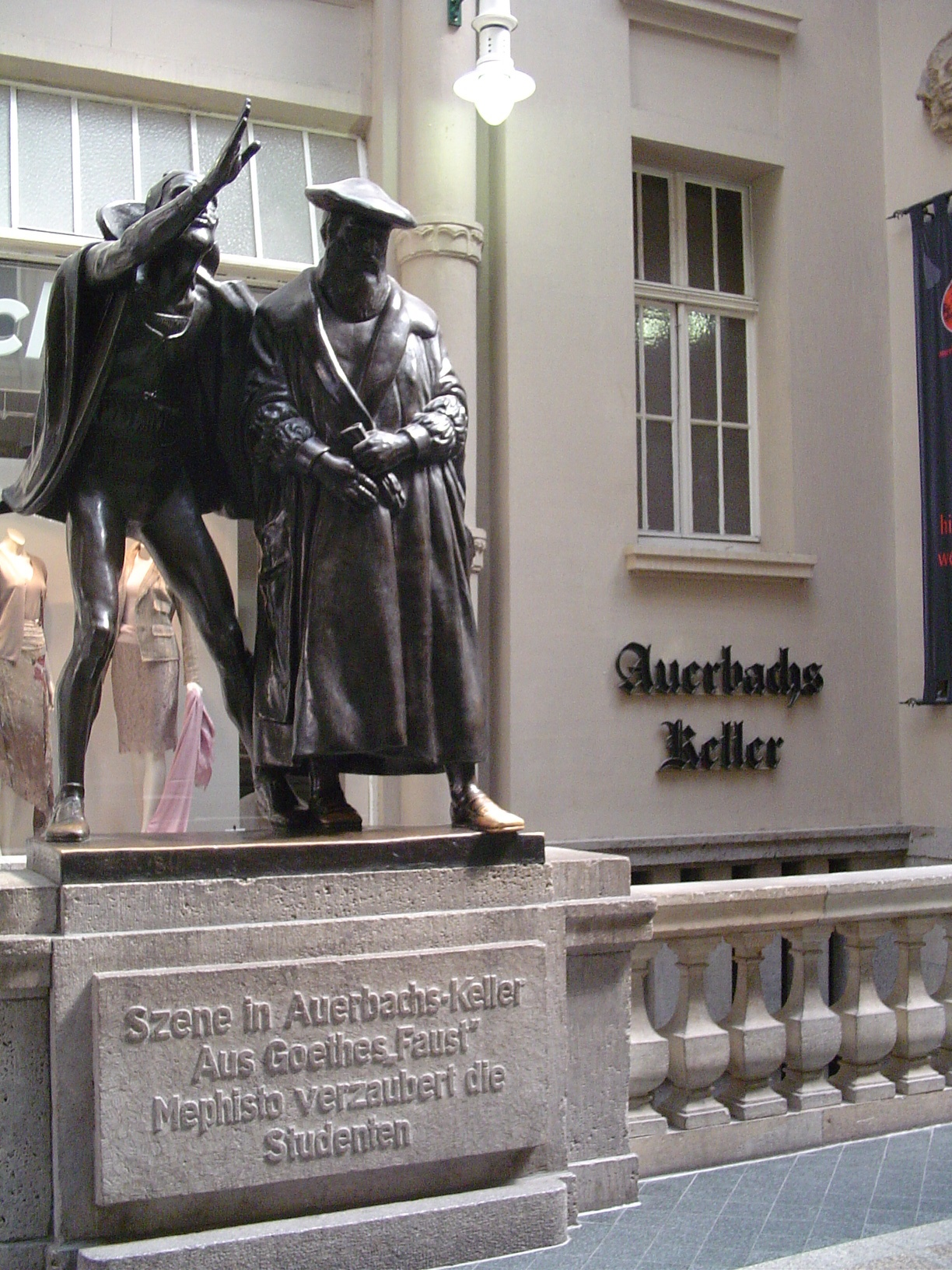
Sculpture of Mephistopheles bewitching the students in the scene "Auerbachs Keller" from Faust, at the entrance of what is today the restaurant Auerbachs Keller in Leipzig

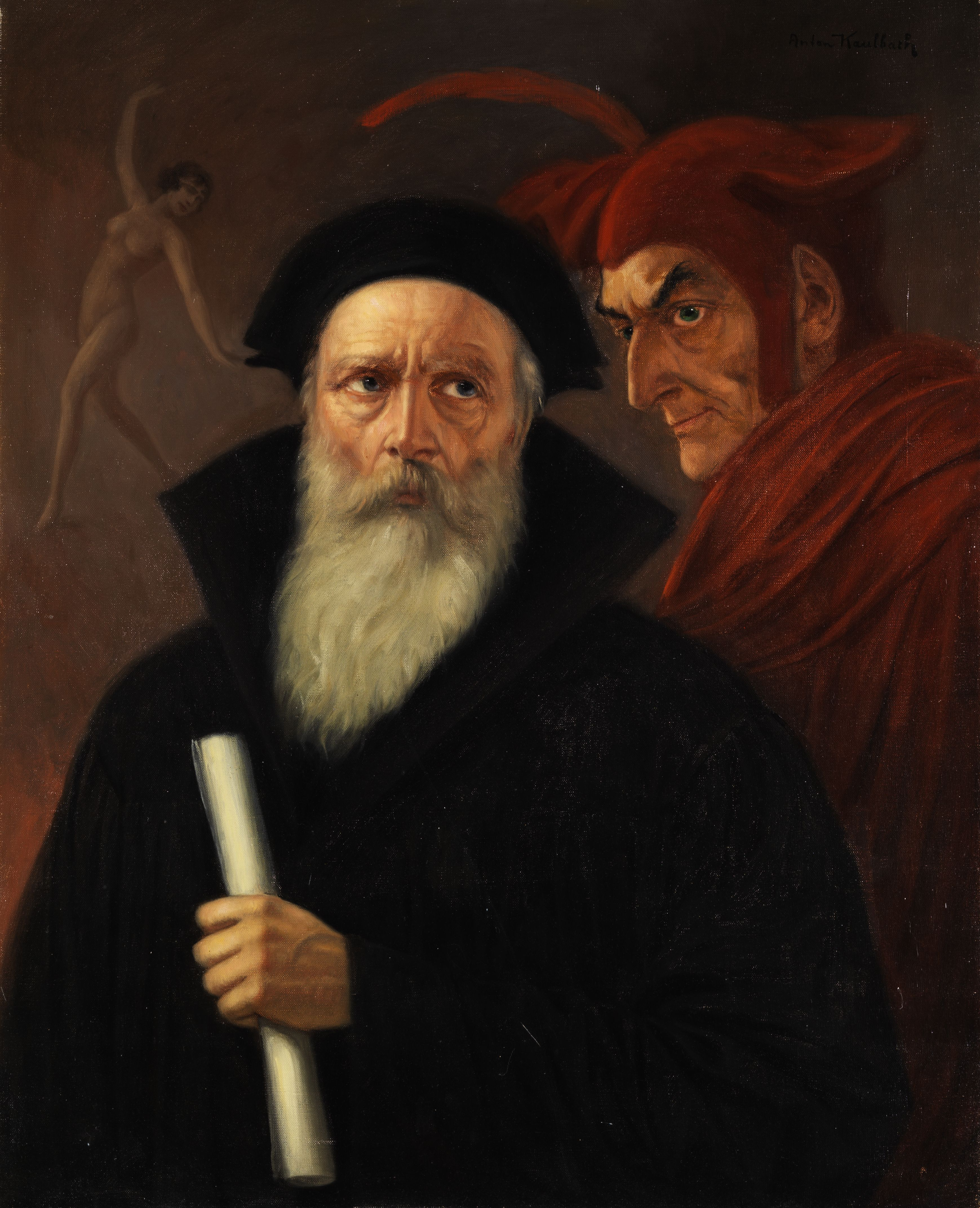
Anton Kaulbach: Faust and Mephisto

Faust (/faʊst/ FOWST, German: [faʊst]) is a tragic play in two parts by Johann Wolfgang von Goethe, usually known in English as Faust, Part One and Faust, Part Two, based on the German folk legend Faust. Nearly all of Part One and the majority of Part Two are written in rhymed verse. Although rarely staged in its entirety, it is the play with the largest audience numbers on German-language stages. Faust is considered by many to be Goethe's magnum opus and the greatest work of German literature.

The earliest forms of the work, known as the Urfaust, were developed between 1772 and 1775; however, the details of that development are not entirely clear. Urfaust has twenty-two scenes, one in prose, two largely prose and the remaining 1,441 lines in rhymed verse. The manuscript is lost, but a copy was discovered in 1886.

The first appearance of the work in print was Faust, a Fragment, published in 1790. Goethe completed a preliminary version of what is now known as Part One in 1806. Its publication in 1808 was followed by the revised 1828–29 edition, the last to be edited by Goethe himself.

Goethe finished writing Faust, Part Two in 1831; it was published posthumously the following year. In contrast to Faust, Part One, the focus here is no longer on the soul of Faust, which has been sold to the devil, but rather on social phenomena such as psychology, history and politics, in addition to mystical and philosophical topics. The second part formed the principal occupation of Goethe's last years.

== Nomenclature ==
The original 1808 German title page of Goethe's play read simply: "Faust. / Eine Tragödie" ("Faust. / A Tragedy"). The addition of "erster Teil" (in English, "Part One") was retroactively applied by publishers when the sequel was published in 1832 with a title page which read: "Faust. / Der Tragödie zweiter Teil" ("Faust. / The Tragedy's Second Part").

The two plays have been published in English under a number of titles, and are usually referred to as Faust, Parts One and Two.

== Faust, Part One ==
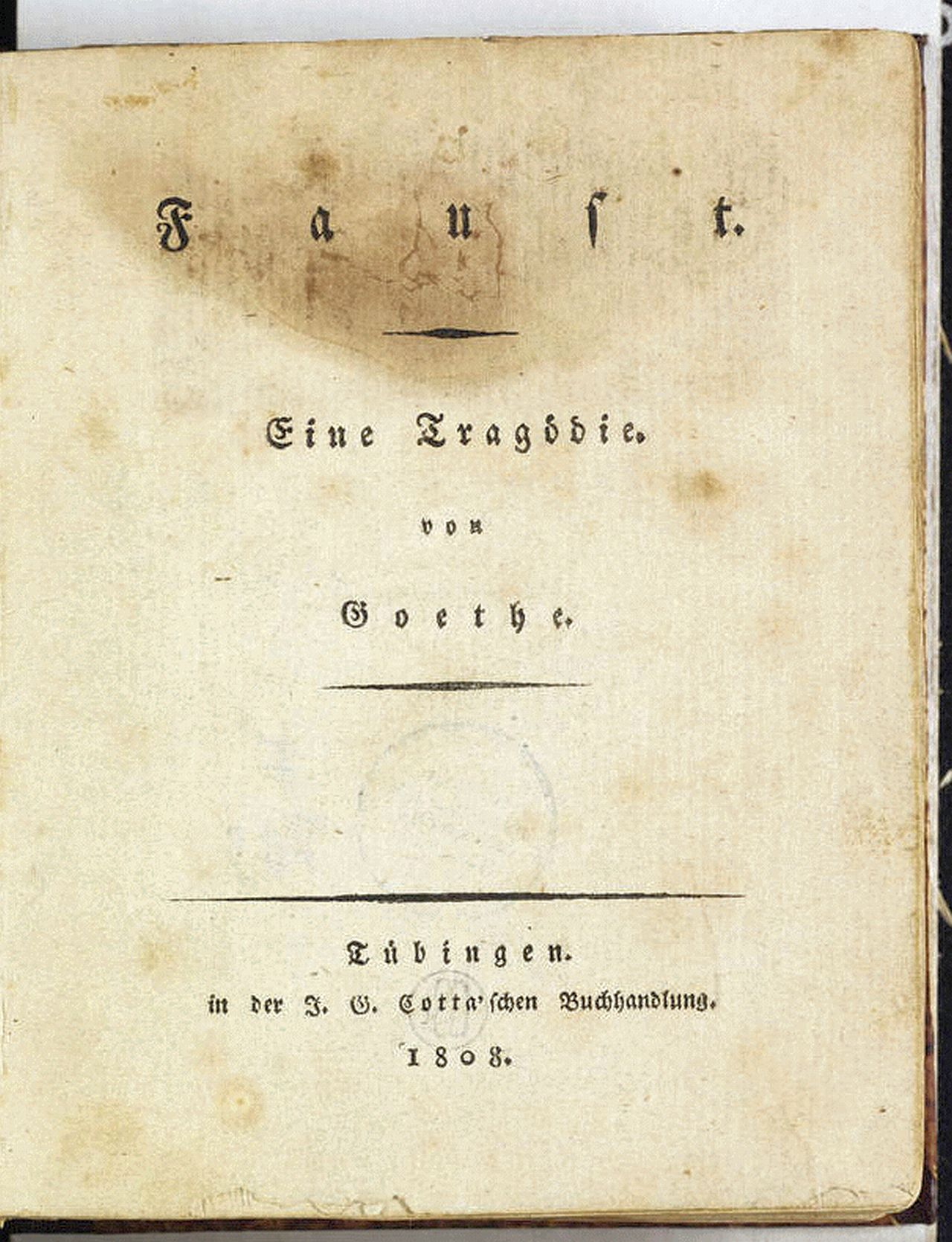
Faust I, first edition, 1808

The principal characters of Faust Part One include:

- Heinrich Faust (see also Faust), a scholar, sometimes said to be based on Johann Georg Faust, or on Jacob Bidermann's dramatized account of the Legend of the Doctor of Paris, Cenodoxus
- Mephistopheles, the Devil
- Gretchen, Faust's love (short for Margarete; Goethe uses both forms)
- Marthe Schwerdtlein, Gretchen's neighbour
- Valentin, Gretchen's brother
- Wagner, Faust's attendant

Faust, Part One takes place in multiple settings, the first of which is Heaven. Mephistopheles (Satan) makes a bet with God: he says that he can lure one of God's servants, Faust, who is striving to learn everything that can be known, away from righteous pursuits. The next scene takes place in Faust's study where the aging scholar, struggling with what he considers the vanity and uselessness of scientific, humanistic, and religious learning, turns to magic for the showering of infinite knowledge. He suspects, however, that his attempts are failing. Frustrated, he ponders suicide, but rejects it as he hears the echo of nearby Easter celebrations begin. He goes for a walk with his assistant Wagner and is followed home by a stray poodle.

In Faust's study, the poodle transforms into Mephistopheles, dressed as a travelling student who refuses to give his name. He reveals to Faust that although the misshapen pentagram carved into Faust's doorway has allowed him to enter, he cannot leave. Faust is surprised that Mephistopheles is bound by mystical laws, and from this reasons that he could make a pact. Mephistopheles says that he is willing to make a deal but wishes to leave for the night. Faust refuses to release him because he believes it would be impossible for him to catch Mephistopheles again. Mephistopheles then tricks him into permitting a demonstration of his power; Faust falls asleep listening to the song of the spirits, allowing Mephistopheles to escape by calling upon rats to chew away the pentagram.

The next morning Mephistopheles returns. He tells Faust that he wishes to serve him in life, and in return Faust must serve him in the afterlife. Faust is willing to accept but is concerned that accepting the services of Mephistopheles will bring him to ruin. To avoid this fate, Faust makes a wager: if Mephistopheles can grant Faust an experience of transcendence on Earth—a moment so blissful that he wishes to remain in it forever, ceasing to strive further—then he will instantly die and serve the Devil in Hell. Mephistopheles accepts the wager.

When Mephistopheles tells Faust to sign the pact with blood, Faust complains that Mephistopheles does not trust Faust's word of honour. In the end, Mephistopheles wins the argument and Faust signs the contract with a drop of his own blood. Faust has a few excursions and then meets Margaret (also known as Gretchen). He is attracted to her and with jewellery and with help from a neighbour, Marthe, Mephistopheles draws Gretchen into Faust's arms. With Mephistopheles' aid, Faust seduces Gretchen. Gretchen's mother dies from a sleeping potion, administered by Gretchen to obtain privacy so that Faust could visit her. Gretchen discovers she is pregnant. Gretchen's brother condemns Faust, challenges him and falls dead at the hands of Faust and Mephistopheles. Gretchen drowns her illegitimate child and is convicted of the murder. Faust tries to save Gretchen from death by attempting to free her from prison. Finding that she refuses to escape, Faust and Mephistopheles flee the dungeon, while voices from Heaven announce that Gretchen shall be saved – "Sie ist gerettet" – this differs from the harsher ending of Urfaust – "Sie ist gerichtet!" – "she is condemned."

== Faust, Part Two ==
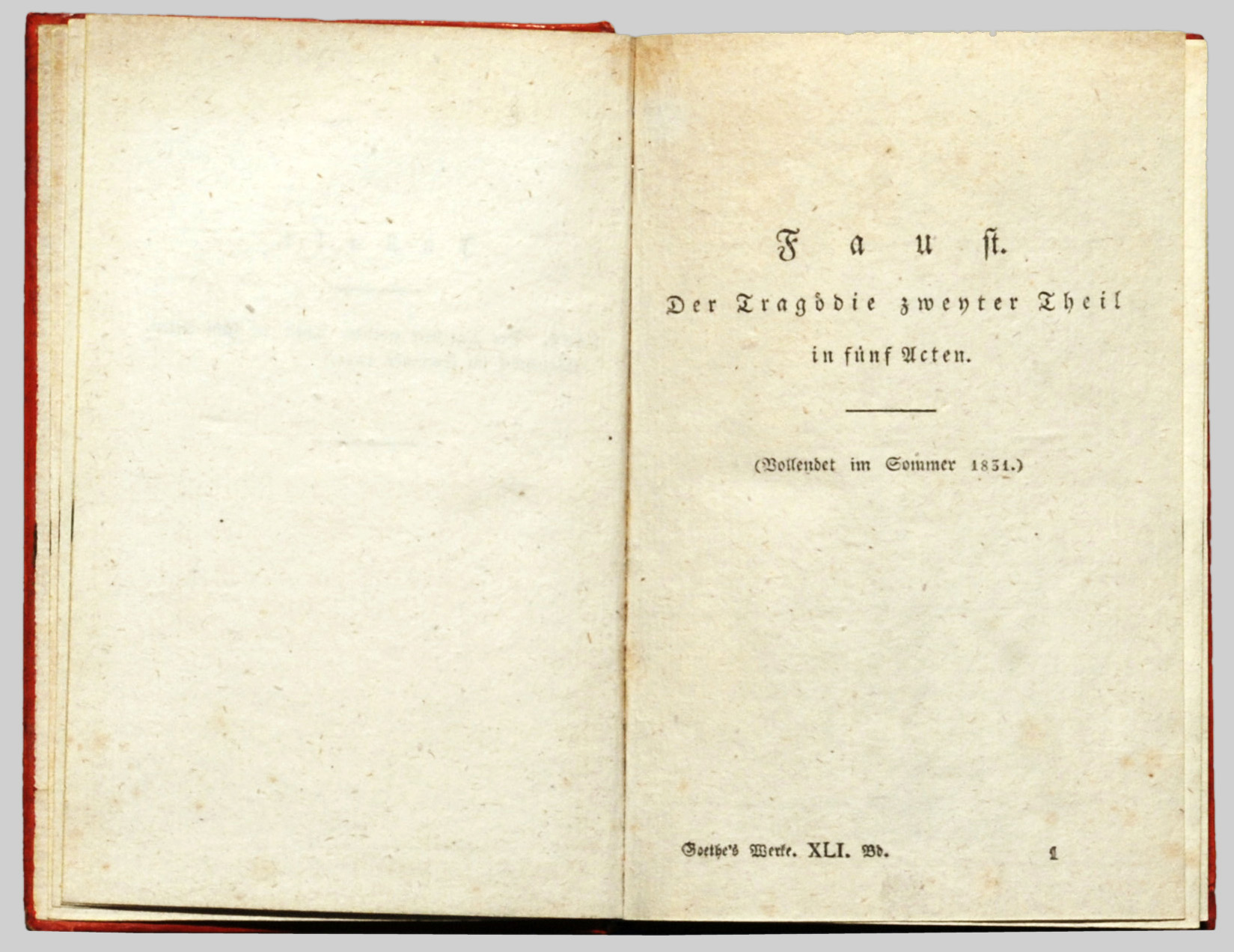
Faust II, first edition, 1832

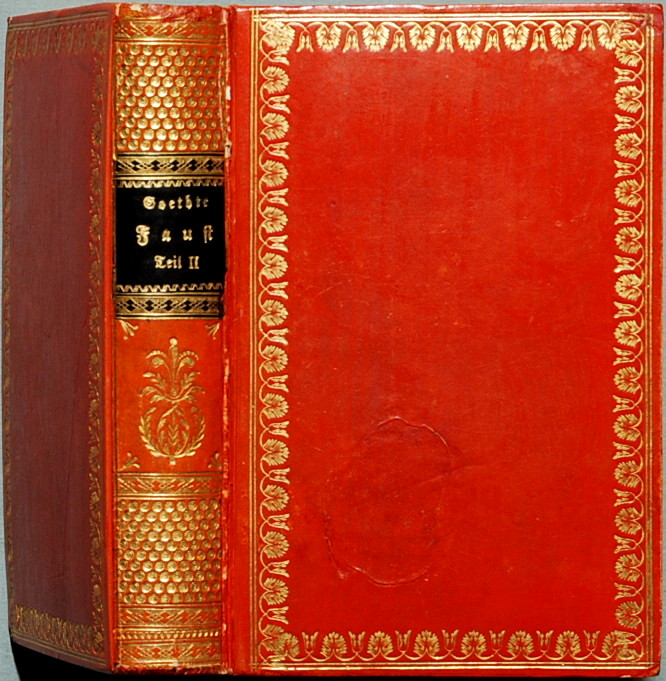
Cover of the first edition of Faust Part Two, 1832

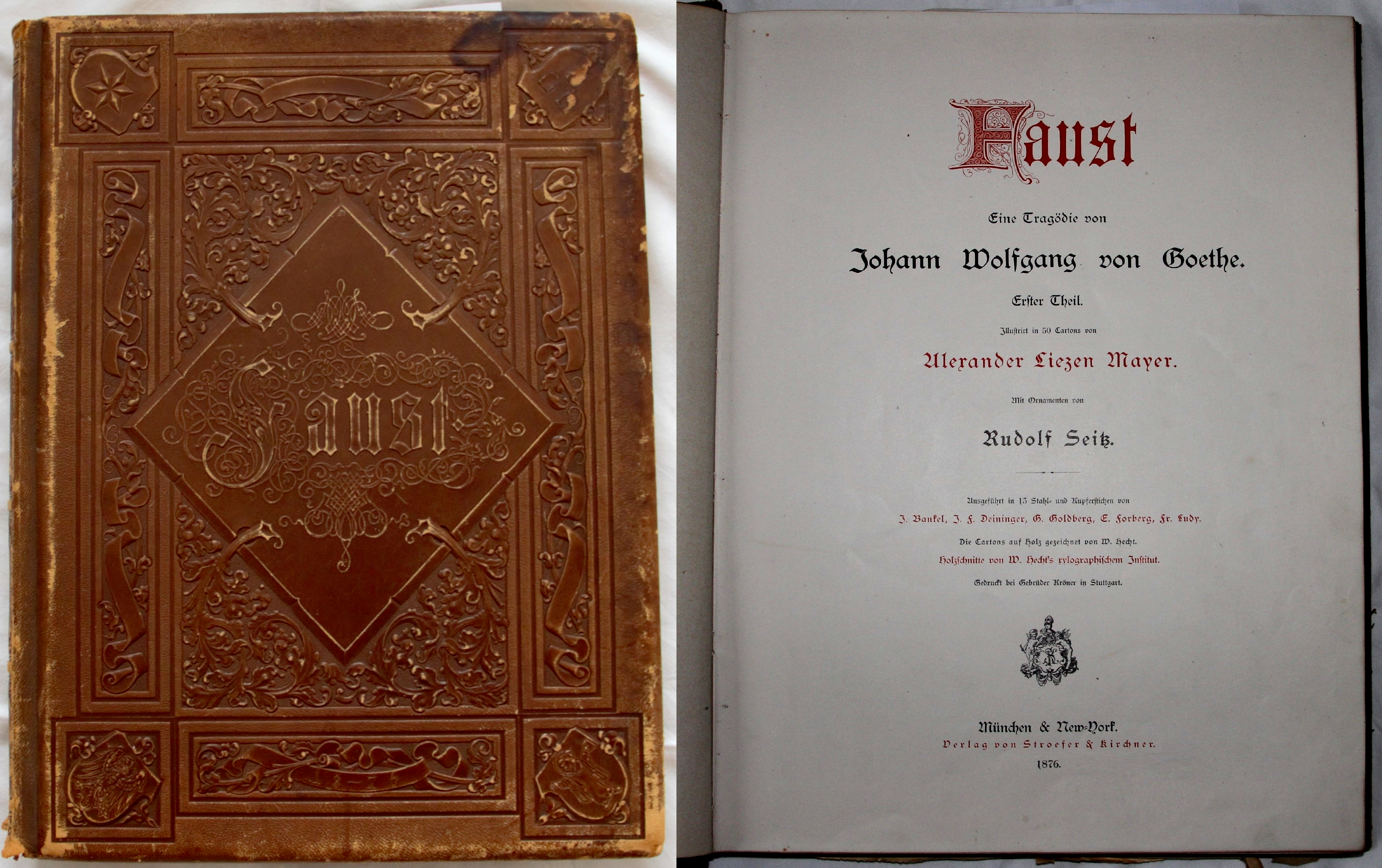
1876 Faust, large edition (51×38cm)

Rich in classical allusion, in Part Two the romantic story of the first Faust is put aside, and Faust wakes in a field of fairies to initiate a new cycle of adventures and purpose. The piece consists of five acts—relatively isolated episodes—each representing a different theme. Ultimately, Faust goes to Heaven. He had lost his wager with Mephistopheles, that he would never seek to remain in a transcendental moment and have it prolonged forever. However, God had won his wager from the Prologue (and thus Faust's soul) as the transcendental moment was derived from his righteous pursuits. Angels, who arrive as messengers of divine mercy, declare at the end of Act V: "He who strives on and lives to strive / Can earn redemption still" (V, 11936–7).

== Relationship between the parts ==
Throughout Part One, Faust remains unsatisfied; the ultimate conclusion of the tragedy and the outcome of the wagers are only revealed in Faust, Part Two. The first part represents the "small world" and takes place in Faust's own local, temporal milieu. In contrast, Part Two takes place in the "wide world" or macrocosmos.

== Role of music in Goethe’s play ==
Notably, Goethe’s Faust — "is permeated by music in both of its parts. It is, however, not granted to Heinrich Faust. Music resounds around him, not from within him. Margarete’s expression is musical in nature; spirits can be heard singing in chorus; the students bawl their ditties; and even Mephisto has his songs. It is precisely Faust’s exclusion from the music of Faust that Goethe uses as a literary device to bring the character into sharp relief."

== Translations ==
In 1821, a partial English verse translation of Faust (Part One) was published anonymously by the London publisher Thomas Boosey and Sons, with illustrations by the German engraver Moritz Retzsch. This translation was attributed to the English poet Samuel Taylor Coleridge by Frederick Burwick and James C. McKusick in their 2007 Oxford University Press edition, Faustus: From the German of Goethe, Translated by Samuel Taylor Coleridge. In a letter dated 4 September 1820, Goethe wrote to his son August that Coleridge was translating Faust. However, this attribution is controversial: Roger Paulin, William St. Clair, and Elinor Shaffer provide a lengthy rebuttal to Burwick and McKusick, offering evidence including Coleridge's repeated denials that he had ever translated Faustus and arguing that Goethe's letter to his son was based on misinformation from a third party.

Coleridge's fellow Romantic Percy Bysshe Shelley produced admired fragments of a translation first publishing Part One Scene II in The Liberal magazine in 1822, with "Scene I" (in the original, the "Prologue in Heaven") being published in the first edition of his Posthumous Poems by Mary Shelley in 1824.

- In 1828, at the age of twenty, Gérard de Nerval published a French translation of Goethe's Faust.
- In 1850, Anna Swanwick released an English translation of Part One. In 1878, she published a translation of Part Two. Her translation is considered among the best.
- In 1870–71, Bayard Taylor published an English translation in the original metres. This translation, which he is best known for, is considered one of the finest and consistently remained in print for a century.
- Calvin Thomas: Part One (1892) and Part Two (1897) for D. C. Heath.
- Alice Raphael: Part One (1930) for Jonathan Cape.
- Mori Ōgai: 1913 both parts into Japanese.
- Guo Moruo: Part One (1928) and Part Two (1947) into Chinese.
- Philosopher Walter Kaufmann was also known for an English translation of Faust, presenting Part One in its entirety, with selections from Part Two, and omitted scenes extensively summarized. Kaufmann's version preserves Goethe's metres and rhyme schemes, but objected to translating all of Part Two into English, believing that "To let Goethe speak English is one thing; to transpose into English his attempt to imitate Greek poetry in German is another."
- George Madison PRIEST translated Faust in english (1941) and his poetic work was praised by Thomas MANN.
- C. F. MacIntyre: Faust: An American Translation of Part I (1949) for New Directions.
- Phillip Wayne: Part One (1949) and Part Two (1959) for Penguin Books.
- Louis MacNeice: In 1949, the BBC commissioned an abridged translation for radio. It was published in 1952.

In August 1950, Boris Pasternak's Russian translation of the first part led him to be attacked in the Soviet literary journal Novy Mir. The attack read in part,

... the translator clearly distorts Goethe's ideas... in order to defend the reactionary theory of 'pure art' ... he introduces an aesthetic and individualist flavor into the text... attributes a reactionary idea to Goethe... distorts the social and philosophical meaning...

In response, Pasternak wrote to Ariadna Efron, the exiled daughter of Marina Tsvetaeva:

There was some alarm when my Faust was torn to pieces in Novy mir on the basis that supposedly the gods, angels, witches, spirits, the madness of poor Gretchen and everything 'irrational' was rendered too well, whereas Goethe's progressive ideas (which ones?) were left in the shade and unattended.

- Peter Salm: Faust, First Part (1962) for Bantam Books.
- Randall Jarrell: Part One (1976) for Farrar, Straus and Giroux.
- Walter Arndt: Faust: A Tragedy (1976) for W. W. Norton & Company.
- Stuart Atkins: Faust I & II, Volume 2: Goethe's Collected Works (1984) for Princeton University Press.
- David Luke: Part One (1987) and Part Two (1994) for Oxford University Press.
- Martin Greenberg: Part One (1992) and Part Two (1998) for Yale University Press.
- John R. Williams: Part One (1999) and Part Two (2007) for Wordsworth Editions.
- David Constantine: Part One (2005) and Part Two (2009) for Penguin Books.
- Zsuzsanna Ozsváth and Frederick Turner: Part One (2020) for Deep Vellum Books, with illustrations by Fowzia Karimi.

== Historic productions ==
=== Part One ===
- May 24, 1819: Premiere of selected scenes. Castle Monbijou, Berlin
- January 29, 1829: Premiere of the complete Part One. Braunschweig
- In 1885, the Irish dramatist W. G. Wills loosely adapted the first part of Faust for a production starring Henry Irving as Mephistopheles and Ellen Terry as Margaret at the Lyceum Theatre, London.
- In 1908, Stephen Phillips and J. Comyns Carr freely adapted the first part of Faust for a production at Her Majesty's Theatre. It starred Henry Ainley as Faust, Herbert Beerbohm Tree as Mephistopheles and Marie Lohr as Margaret.
- 1960: Deutsches Schauspielhaus, Hamburg: Directed by Peter Gorski, and produced by Gustaf Gründgens (who also played Mephistopheles), with Will Quadflieg (Faust), Ella Büchi (Gretchen), Elisabeth Flickenschildt (Marthe), Max Eckard (Valentin), Eduard Marks (Wagner), Uwe Friedrichsen (Student). The film of this performance was very successful.
- 1989: Fragments from Part One. Piccolo Teatro di Milano: Director Giorgio Strehler, scenographer Josef Svoboda
- October 26, 2006: Teatro Comunale Modena, Italy: Directed by Eimuntas Nekrošius; complete playing length (with intervals): 4½ hours

=== Part Two ===
- 1990: Fragments from Part Two. Piccolo Teatro di Milano: Director Giorgio Strehler, scenographer Josef Svoboda
- 2003 of Ingmar Thilo; with Antonios Safralis (Faust), Raphaela Zick (Mephisto), Ulrike Dostal (Helena), Max Friedmann (Lynceus), and others
- 2005 Michael Thalheimer at the Deutsches Theater, Berlin, with a.o. Ingo Hülsmann, Sven Lehmann, Nina Hoss and Inge Keller

=== Entire piece ===
- 1938: World premiere of both parts, unabridged, at the Goetheanum in Dornach, Switzerland
- July 22–23, 2000: The Expo 2000 Hanover performance: Directed by Peter Stein; both parts in their complete version, with Christian Nickel and Bruno Ganz (the young and the old Faust), Johann Adam Oest (Mephistopheles), Dorothée Hartinger, Corinna Kirchhoff and Elke Petri. Complete playing length (with intervals): 21 hours

== Adaptations ==
- Ludwig van Beethoven's song "Es war einmal ein König": Aus Goethes Faust, Op. 75, No. 3 (1809)
- In 1814 Franz Schubert set a text from Faust Part I, scene 18 as "Gretchen am Spinnrade" (D 118; Op. 2). It was his first setting of a text by Goethe. Later Lieder by Schubert based on Faust: D 126, 367, 440 and 564.
- Antoni Henryk Radziwiłł's opera Faust (1835) is based on the original version of Faust Part I. Composed between 1808 and 1832, it received its first complete performance in Berlin in 1835. Created in close contact with Goethe, Radziwiłł’s musical setting is considered to have influenced the author’s subsequent revisions of his drama.
- Robert Schumann's secular oratorio Scenes from Goethe's Faust (1844–1853)
- Hector Berlioz's "légende dramatique" La damnation de Faust (1846)
- Franz Liszt's Faust Symphony (1857)
- Charles Gounod's opera Faust (1859)
- Arrigo Boito's opera Mefistofele (1868; 1875)
- Gustav Mahler's Symphony No. 8 (Mahler) (1906) sets the text of the final scene of Faust Part II in its lengthy second movement.
- F. W. Murnau's film Faust (1926) is based on older versions of the legend as well as Goethe's version.
- Havergal Brian's opera Faust written in 1955–56.
- Peter Gorski directed Gustaf Gründgens in the 1960 film, Faust. Havergal Brian's opera Faust written in 1955–56.
- Stanley Donen directed Peter Cook and Dudley Moorein the 1967 film, Bedazzled.
- Brian De Palma's 1974 musical/horror/comedy film Phantom of the Paradise blends the story of Faust with Gaston Leroux's The Phantom of the Opera.
- The production is also briefly mentioned in Katja Ebatein's 1976 personality television show Katja and Co.
- Randy Newman's musical Faust (1993)
- Jan Švankmajer's film Faust (1994)
- Rudolf Volz's Rock Opera Faust with original lyrics by Goethe (1997)
- American metal band Kamelot's CDs Epica (2003) and The Black Halo (2005) are based on Faust.
- Alexander Sokurov's film Faust (2011)
- American metal band Agalloch's Faustian Echoes EP is directly based on Goethe's work and contains direct quotations from it.
- Swedish singer and rapper Bladee's song "Faust" is based on Goethe's work.
- Philipp Humm's modern art film The Last Faust (2019) is directly based on Goethe's Faust and is the first film made on Faust part I and part II.
- Alexander Pavlenko's and Jan Krauß' comic book Faust (2021)

== See also ==
- Deals with the Devil in popular culture
- Lawsuits against the Devil
- Mephistopheles and Margaretta, sculpture
- Verse drama and dramatic verse
- Woland, character in Bulgakov's novel The Master and Margarita
- Works based on Faust
