= Catherine Chandler =

Canadian poet (born 1950)

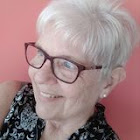
- Born: New York City
- Citizenship: Canadian
- Education: McGill University
- Occupations: Poet and translator
- Website: cathychandler.blogspot.com

Catherine M. Chandler (born November 1950) is a Canadian poet and translator.

== Career ==
Chandler's work has appeared in numerous print and online journals and anthologies, including Able Muse, Alabama Literary Review, American Arts Quarterly, The Centrifugal Eye, Comstock Review, First Things, Iambs and Trochees, Light Quarterly, The Lyric, Measure, Möbius, Orbis, Quadrant, The Raintown Review, Texas Poetry Journal and many others. She is the author of Lines of Flight (Able Muse Press, 2011), a highly acclaimed full-length collection of poetry in various forms, including the sonnet, pantoum, rondeau (poetry), villanelle, triolet, sapphic stanza, ballad stanza, quatrain, cinquain, cento (poetry) and other forms. Her second book, Glad and Sorry Seasons was published in the spring of 2014 by Biblioasis Press of Windsor, Ontario, and her third book, The Frangible Hour, winner of the Richard Wilbur Award, was published by the University of Evansville Press at the end of December 2016. Her fourth full-length collection, Pointing Home was published by Kelsay Books in April 2019. Her most recent book, Annals of the Dear Unknown, an historical verse-tale, was published by Kelsay Books in 2022. She is also the author of three chapbooks, For No Good Reason, All or Nothing, and This Sweet Order (White Violet Press/Kelsay Books), co-editor of Passages (The Greenwood Centre for Living History, 2010), and editor of North Dakota poet Timothy Murphy's "Last Poems" (North Dakota State University Press, 2021).

Chandler has lectured in Spanish at McGill University's Department of Languages and Translation for many years and also acted as the university's International Affairs Officer. She taught Spanish at Concordia University in Montreal. She taught French, English, and Music for the Commission scolaire des Trois-Lacs in the Vaudreuil-Soulanges region of Quebec.

== Personal life and education ==
Chandler was born in Queens, New York City and raised in Wilkes-Barre, Pennsylvania, emigrating to Canada in 1971. She received a Bachelor of Arts degree in French and Spanish from Wilkes University and a Master of Arts in Education (Culture and Values in Education) from McGill University. She and her husband currently divide their time between their homes in Saint-Lazare-de-Vaudreuil, Québec, and Punta del Este, Uruguay.

== Select awards ==
Chandler is the recipient of the 2016 Richard Wilbur Award for her book The Frangible Hour, University of Evansville Press. She also won the 2010 Howard Nemerov Sonnet Award for her poem "Coming to Terms", the final judge being A.E. Stallings. She was also a finalist for the Nemerov award in 2008 ("Missing"), 2009 ("Singularities"), 2012 ("Composure"), 2013 ("The Watchers at Punta Ballena, Uruguay"), 2014 ("Afterwords"), 2015 ("Oleka"), 2016 ("Family at Sunset Beach, California"), and 2017 ("Celebration"), and won The Lyric Quarterly Prize in 2004 ("Franconia") and the Leslie Mellichamp Award in 2015 ("Chiaroscuro"). Eight of her poems, including "66", "Body of Evidence" and "Writ" received nine Pushcart Prize nominations, and her poem, "66" was a finalist for the Best of the Net award in 2006. Her poem, "Discovery" was a finalist in the Able Muse Write Prize (Poetry) and her Millay parody, "Pack Rat" was a finalist in the 2015 X.J. Kennedy Parody Award. Her first full-length collection, Lines of Flight (Able Muse Press, 2011), was shortlisted for the Poets' Prize in 2013.

She has received numerous endorsements for her work, including praise from Richard Wilbur, who wrote that Chandler's poems "offer the reader a plain eloquence, a keen eye, and a graceful development of thought"; Rhina Espaillat, who praised Chandler's "effortless mastery of form"; Eric Ormsby, who called Chandler's poems "distillations of experience captured in exquisite measures"; and X. J. Kennedy, who named her "an engaging and authoritative new voice". James Matthew Wilson, in his essay, "Intelligent Design: The Poetry of Catherine Chandler", states: "Chandler stands out for both her particular elegance and fluency of style and for the profundity of her vision."

Three of Chandler's poems, "Full Snow Moon," "Superbia," and "The Lost Villages: Inundation Day," were chosen by George Elliott Clarke, Poet Laureate of Canada, for inclusion in the National Poetry Registry, Library of Parliament.

Catherine Chandler's poetry blog, The Wonderful Boat, which includes reviews, a list of awards and nominations, sample poems, podcasts and SoundCloud audio recordings, is online at cathychandler.blogspot.com.

== Works ==
- "Catherine Chandler", Poets & Writers, July 2013
- "Catherine Chandler - Spotlight Poet", Able Muse, Summer 2009
- "Distinguished Performance - Catherine Chandler", Able Muse/Eratosphere, July 2010
- "The Deep Season", The Raintown Review, Volume 9 Issue 2
- "Editor's Note (Catherine Chandler)", 14 by 14, September 2009

=== Collections ===
- For No Good Reason, Self-published chapbook; (2008), ISBN 978-0-9808945-0-9
- All or Nothing, Self-published chapbook; (2010), ISBN 978-0-9808945-1-6
- Lines of Flight, Able Muse Press; (April 4, 2011), ISBN 978-0-9865338-3-9
- This Sweet Order, White Violet Press; (March 28, 2012), ISBN 978-0-615613-42-0
- Glad and Sorry Seasons, Biblioasis; (March 24, 2014), ISBN 978-1-927428-61-0
- The Frangible Hour, University of Evansville Press; (Winner of the 2016 Richard Wilbur Award), ISBN 978-0-930982768
- Pointing Home, Kelsay Books; (April 25, 2019), ISBN 978-1949229776
- Annals of the Dear Unknown, Kelsay Books; (June 21, 2022), ISBN 978-1639801640
