= Feirstein =

Feirstein is a surname. Notable people with the surname include:

- Bruce Feirstein, American screenwriter
- Doug Feirstein, cofounder of Liveops
- Frederick Feirstein (1940–2020), American poet, playwright, and psychoanalyst
