= Leo Yankevich =

American poet

- Born: 30 October 1961; Sharon, Pennsylvania, U.S.
- Died: 11 December 2018 (aged 57)
- Occupations: Poet, editor, translator
- Writing career
- Literary movement: New Formalism
- Website: web.archive.org/web/20181216171553/http://leoyankevich.com/

Leo Yankevich (30 October 1961 – 11 December 2018) was an American poet and the editor of The New Formalist.

== Early life and education ==
Leo Yankevich grew up and attended high school in Farrell, Pennsylvania, a small steel town in western Pennsylvania. He studied History and Polish Studies at Alliance College, Cambridge Springs, Pennsylvania, receiving a BA in 1984. Later that year he traveled to Poland on a fellowship from the Kosciuszko Foundation to attend Kraków's Jagiellonian University.

After the fall of the Iron Curtain in 1989, he decided to settle permanently in Poland. Thereafter, he lived in Gliwice, an industrial city in Upper Silesia.

== Writing activities ==
Yankevich wrote poems in both traditional metre and in syllabics, and only occasionally in free verse. He was a prolific translator, having rendered into English poems by Mikhail Lermontov, Georg Trakl, Rainer Maria Rilke, Stanisław Grochowiak, Czesław Miłosz, Alexander Blok, Leopold Staff, Nikolay Gumilev, Bolesław Leśmian, and many others. He has a large internet presence with work published in scores of online publications, ranging from the Pittsburgh Post-Gazette to Poets Against War.

== Personal life ==
Yankevich was married and had three sons.

== Published works ==
=== Chapbooks ===
- The Language of Birds; Pygmy Forest Press, 1994 ISBN 0-944550-39-8
- Grief's Herbs (translations after the Polish of Stanisław Grochowiak); The Mandrake Press, 1995
- The Gnosis of Gnomes; The Mandrake Press, 1995
- Epistle from The Dark; The Mandrake Press, 1996 ISBN 83-904541-1-4
- The Golem of Gleiwitz; The Mandrake Press, 1998 ISBN 83-904541-6-5
- "Metaphysics" by Leo Yankevich, 2002

=== Books ===
- The Unfinished Crusade; The Mandrake Press, 2000 ISBN 83-904541-9-X
- The Last Silesian; The Mandrake Press, 2005 ISBN 0-9708219-2-1
- Tikkun Olam; Counter-Currents Publishing, 2012 ISBN 978-1-935965-38-1
- Journey Late at Night: Poems & Translations; Counter-Currents Publishing, 2013 ISBN 978-1935965824
- The Hypocrisies of Heaven: Poems New & Old: ; Counter-Currents Publishing, 2016 ISBN 978-1940933764

== Internet Archive's copies ==
- Internet Archive's copy of the Official Leo Yankevich Website
- Internet Archive's copy of Leo Yankevich Poems at Poemhunter.com
