= Erica Dawson =

Erica Dawson may refer to:

- Erica Dawson (poet)
- Erica Dawson (sailor)
