= Rebel Angels: 25 Poets of the New Formalism =

Poetry compilation

- Author: Mark Jarman, David Mason
- Publisher: Story Line Press
- Publication date: 1996
- ISBN: 1-885266-33-2

Rebel Angels: 25 Poets of the New Formalism is an anthology of poets edited by Mark Jarman and David Mason, published by Story Line Press in 1996. The stated objective of this anthology was to showcase American poetry in traditional verse by poets born since 1940.

The 25 poets represented are: Elizabeth Alexander, Julia Alvarez, Bruce Bawer, Rafael Campo, Thomas M. Disch, Frederick Feirstein, Dana Gioia, Emily Grosholz, R. S. Gwynn, Marilyn Hacker, Rachel Hadas, Andrew Hudgins, Paul Lake, Sydney Lea, Brad Leithauser, Phillis Levin, Charles Martin, Marilyn Nelson, Molly Peacock, Wyatt Prunty, Mary Jo Salter, Timothy Steele, Frederick Turner, Rachel Wetzsteon, and Greg Williamson.

== Reviews ==
- John Lucas, "The Tame and the Just?", Darkhorse, Summer 1997
- Keith Maillard, "Review", Antogonish Review 109
