= Donald Justice Poetry Prize =

- The logo as it appears on books that have won
- Awarded for: unpublished 50–100 typed page manuscript of formal poetry
- Country: United States
- Presented by: WCU Poetry Center
- Reward: $1,500, publication
- First award: 2006; 20 years ago
- Final award: 2025; 1 year ago
- Currently held by: P. Scott Cunningham
- Website: Donald Justice Poetry Prize

The Donald Justice Poetry Prize is an American national competition sponsored by the Spencer Poetry Awards of the West Chester University Poetry Center which Kean W. Spencer created in honor of his mother, Iris N. Spencer. The prize recognizes the distinguished American poet, teacher, and Pulitzer Prize winner, Donald Justice. The WCU Poetry Center welcomes submissions of unpublished, original book-length manuscripts that pay attention to form for consideration in this competition.

The submissions are judged blindly and selected by a notable poet who works in traditional forms. Past judges have included Major Jackson, Patricia Smith, Cornelius Eady, Erica Dawson, David Mason, A. E. Stallings, and Marilyn Nelson.

The winner receives $1,500 and will have the manuscript published. Prior to 2018, winning poetry collections were either published by Measure Press or West Chester University.

== Past winners ==
The following are the winners of the Donald Justice Poetry Prize:

- 2006 — Kate Light, Gravity's Dream: New Poems and Sonnets
- 2007 — Kim Bridgford, In the Extreme: Sonnets about World Records
- 2008 — John Poch, Two Men Fighting with a Knife
- 2009 — Julie Kane, Jazz Funeral
- 2010 — Ned Balbo, Trials of Edgar Poe and Other Poems
- 2011 — Amit Majmudar, Heaven and Earth
- 2012 — Joanna Pearson, Oldest Mortal Myth
- 2013 — Anne-MarieThompson, Audiation
- 2014 — Susan McLean, The Whetstone Misses the Knife
- 2014 — Stephen Gibson, Rorschach Art Too
- 2015 — Jeff Hardin, Restoring the Narrative
- 2015 — Pat Valdata, Where No Man Can Touch
- 2017 — Ryan Wilson, The Stranger World
- 2018 — Chad Abushanab, The Last Visit
- 2019 — Katherine Barrett Swett, Voice Message
- 2020 — John Foy, No One Leaves the World Unhurt
- 2021 — Alexis Sears, Out of Order
- 2022 — J. D. Debris, The Scorpion's Question Mark
- 2023 — Erica Reid, Ghost Man on Second
- 2024 — Sunni Brown Wilkinson, Rodeo
- 2025 — P. Scott Cunningham, Self Portrait as the "i" in Florida
- 2026 — TBD
