= Rebel Angels =

Rebel Angels may refer to:

- The Rebel Angels, a 1981 novel by Robertson Davies
- Rebel Angels: 25 Poets of the New Formalism, a 1996 poetry anthology
- Rebel Angels (novel), a 2006 fantasy novel by Libba Bray
- Rebel angels, a theme in some Jewish, Christian, and Islamic literature
