= Kim Bridgford =

American writer (1959–2020)

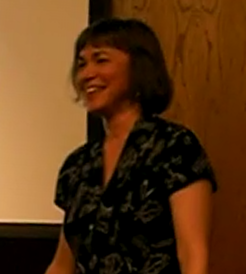
- Born: August 8, 1959; Coal Valley, Illinois, U.S.
- Died: June 28, 2020 (aged 60); Bettendorf, Iowa, U.S.
- Education: University of Iowa (B.A. and M.F.A.); University of Illinois at Urbana-Champaign (Ph.D.)
- Occupations: Professor; editor; poet; fiction writer; critic
- Spouse: Peter Duval
- Children: 1
- Writing career
- Notable awards: Connecticut Professor of the Year (1994); Donald Justice Poetry Prize (2007)
- Movement: New Formalism

Kim Bridgford published her poetry collection "Instead of Maps" in 2005

Kim Suzanne Bridgford (August 8, 1959 – June 28, 2020) was an American poet, writer, critic, and academic. In her poetry, she wrote primarily in traditional forms, particularly sonnets. She was the director of Poetry by the Sea: A Global Conference, established in 2014 and first held in May 2015. She directed the West Chester University Poetry Conference from 2010-14.

As editor-in-chief at Mezzo Cammin, a journal of poetry by women, she founded The Mezzo Cammin Women Poets Timeline Project, which is designed to become the world's largest database of women poets. She was formerly the editor of Dogwood: A Journal of Poetry and Prose.

== Life ==
Kim Bridgford was born in 1959. She grew up in Coal Valley, Illinois. She earned both her Bachelor of Arts and Master of Fine Arts degrees from the University of Iowa; the latter degree was earned from the Iowa Writers' Workshop. Bridgford earned her Ph.D. from the University of Illinois.

She started teaching at Fairfield University in Connecticut in 1989. In 1994, she moved to Wallingford, Connecticut with her husband, Peter Duval, an award-winning author of fiction. In 1996, their son, Nick, was born. In August 2010, she and her family moved to Philadelphia, where Bridgford joined the West Chester University faculty and served as director of the West Chester University Poetry Center.

Bridgford died from cancer on June 28, 2020, at the age of 60, at a hospice care center in Bettendorf, Iowa.

== Awards and honors ==
In 1994, Bridgford was named Connecticut Professor of the Year by the Carnegie Foundation for the Advancement of Teaching. In 1999, she was awarded a National Endowment for the Arts fellowship in poetry. In 2003, she received a poetry fellowship from the Connecticut Commission on the Arts.

Bridgford was the 2007 Touring Poet for the Connecticut Poetry Circuit. That year, her book In the Extreme: Sonnets about World Records received the 2007 Donald Justice Poetry Award.

== Books ==
- 2003 — Undone (WordTech Communications)
- 2005 — Instead of Maps (WordTech Communications, May 1, 2005), nominated for the Poets' Prize
- 2007 — In the Extreme: Sonnets about World Records (Contemporary Poetry Review Press), winner of Donald Justice Poetry Prize
- 2010 — Take-Out: Sonnets about Fortune Cookies (David Roberts Books; WordTech Communications)
- 2011 — Hitchcock's Coffin: Sonnets about Classic Films (David Roberts Books; WordTech Communications)
- 2012 — Bully Pulpit: Poems (White Violet Press)
- 2013 — Epiphanies: Poems (David Roberts Books; WordTech Communications)
- 2014 — Doll (Main Street Rag)
- 2016 — Human Interest (White Violet Press)
- 2019 — A Crown for Ted and Sylvia (Wipf and Stock)

In addition, Bridgford's poetry has appeared in The North American Review, The Christian Science Monitor, and The Iowa Review. While best known as a poet, she also wrote fiction which has appeared in The Georgia Review, The Massachusetts Review, and Redbook.
