= Fowzia =

Fowzia or Fowzieh is a feminine given name of Arabic origin. Notable people with the name include:

== Given name ==
=== Fowzia ===
- Fowzia Fathima (born 1972), Indian film cinematographer and director
- Fowzia Karimi, Afghan-American author and illustrator

=== Fowzieh ===
- Fowzieh Khalili (born 1958), Indian cricketer
