= Jane Greer (poet) =

American poet (1953–2025)

- Born: May 25, 1953; Fort Madison, Iowa, U.S.
- Died: July 22, 2025 (aged 72); Bismarck, North Dakota, U.S.
- Occupation: Poet
- Known for: Founder of Plains Poetry Journal

Jane Greer (May 25, 1953 – July 22, 2025) was an American poet. She founded Plains Poetry Journal, a quarterly literary magazine that was an advance guard of the New Formalism movement, in 1981, and edited it until 1993. Her poetry collections include Bathsheba on the Third Day (1986), Love like a Conflagration (2020), and The World as We Know It Is Falling Away (2022).

== Career ==
In 1981, Greer founded Plains Poetry Journal, a quarterly literary magazine that was an advance guard of the New Formalism movement. In her "Editorial Manifesto", Greer wrote: "Through history, the best poetry has used certain conventions: meter, rhyme, alliteration, assonance, painstaking attention to diction. Not all good poems use all of these conventions, but if a poem uses none of them, why call it a poem?" She decried the sort of conversational free verse "that reads like random thoughts randomly written", and wrote: "All these attempts at unfettered individuality sound alike." In 1984, Writer's Digest named Plains Poetry Journal the "#1 Non-paying U.S. Poetry Magazine." Greer edited Plains Poetry Journal until 1993.

In the 1980s and early 1990s, Greer's poems appeared in the anthologies A Formal Feeling Comes, edited by Annie Finch, and A Garland for Harry Duncan, edited by W. Thomas Taylor, and in many journals, including Yale Literary Magazine, First Things, America, and Chronicles. For Chronicles she also wrote the monthly "Letters from the Heartland" column. Her ideas about poetics and esthetics are elaborated in a short essay, "Art Is Made", in A Formal Feeling Comes.

In 1986, Greer's first poetry collection, Bathsheba on the Third Day, was released in a limited hardcover edition of three hundred copies hand-typeset and hand-printed by Harry Duncan at The Cummington Press.

After nearly three decades working as a civil servant for the State of North Dakota, teaching writing at Bismarck State College, and working in advertising and marketing, Greer returned in 2019 to writing poetry and being published in major journals, including National Review, Modern Age, First Things, St. Austin Review, The North American Anglican, and Angelus. She has been featured in several podcasts, and wrote reviews for publications such as Literary Matters and Angelus.

Greer's second poetry collection, Love like a Conflagration, was published in May 2020 by Lambing Press (Pittsburgh, Pennsylvania). The collection of new poems also included a reissue of Bathsheba on the Third Day, and received strong advance endorsements from Samuel John Hazo, James Matthew Wilson, Anthony Esolen, Ryan Wilson, C. C. Pecknold, A. M. Juster, and Jennifer Reeser.

In 2022, Greer's third collection of poetry, The World as We Know It Is Falling Away, was published by Lambing.

== Death and legacy ==
Greer died after a brief illness in Bismarck, North Dakota, on July 22, 2025, at the age of 72. According to National Review, "some considered Greer to be the greatest living American poet." She was also remembered as, "the lady who helped (homeless people) write a résumé and prepare for job interviews," and that many of the attendees of funerals were "surprised to hear she was a nationally renowned poet."

== Bibliography ==
- The World as We Know It Is Falling Away: New Poems, Lambing Press, Pittsburgh, Pa. 2022
- Love like a Conflagration, Lambing Press, Pittsburgh, Pa. 2020
- Bathsheba on the Third Day, The Cummington Press, University of Nebraska, Omaha, Neb. 1986.
- Greer, Jane. "Rodin's 'Gates of Hell'", A Formal Feeling Comes: Poems in Form by Contemporary Women, Annie Finch, Ed., Story Line Press, Brownsville, Ore., 1994. pp. 79–80.
- Greer, Jane. "Professor Dobbs to Jayleen Nichols on Semantics and the Fact of Myth", A Garland for Harry Duncan, W. Thomas Taylor, Ed., W. Thomas Taylor Press, Austin, Texas, 1989. pp. 37–38.
