= Fowzia Karimi =

Afghan-American author and illustrator

Fowzia Karimi is an Afghan-American author and illustrator who won the Rona Jaffe Foundation Writers' Award in 2011.

== Early life and education ==
Karimi was born in Kabul and relocated to the United States in 1980.

She has a masters in fine arts degree from Mills College at Northeastern University, in California.

== Career ==
Karimi won the Rona Jaffe Foundation Writers' Award in 2011. She illustrated Micheline Aharonian Marcom's 2017 book The Brick House. She illustrated Zsuzsanna Ozsváth and Frederick Turner's translation of Goethe's Faust, published by Deep Vellum, in 2020.

Karimi is the author of the illustrated book Above us the Milky Way: An Illuminated Alphabet, published by Deep Vellum, in 2020). The book was Karimi's first, is autobiographical, and incorporates family photographs and watercolour paintings. It follows the stories of five sisters, who are born in Afghanistan and relocate to the United States. It was described by D Magazine as "gorgeous". It was re-released in audiobook format in 2021. The book inspired the 2022 exhibit Above Us the Milky Way in Void Gallery, Belfast.

She was a Neustadt International Prize for Literature jury member in 2022.

== Personal life ==
Karimi lives in Denton, Texas.
