= Grochowiak =

Grochowiak is a Polish surname. Notable people with the surname include:

- Sebastian Grochowiak (born 1977), Polish vocalist, member of metal band Witchmaster
- Stanisław Grochowiak (1934–1976), Polish poet and dramatist
