= Joanna Pearson =

American writer and psychiatrist (born 20th century)

- Education: University of North Carolina at Chapel Hill; Johns Hopkins Writing Seminars (MFA); Johns Hopkins School of Medicine (MD)
- Occupations: writer; psychiatrist
- Children: 2
- Writing career
- Period: Contemporary
- Genres: Mystery fiction Thriller
- Website: joanna-pearson.com

Joanna Pearson is an American novelist, short story writer, poet, and psychiatrist. She published two books of short stories, Every Human Love, in 2019, and Now You Know it All, in 2021, and a novel, Bright and Tender Dark, in 2024. Pearson is a recipient of the Donald Justice Poetry Prize and the Drue Heinz Literature Prize.

== Early life and education ==
Pearson grew up in Cleveland County, North Carolina. She was presented at the North Carolina Debutante Ball in Raleigh in 1999, although she was reluctant to take part in the event.

Pearson graduated from the University of North Carolina at Chapel Hill in 2002. She obtained a master of fine arts degree in poetry from the Johns Hopkins Writing Seminars and a medical degree from Johns Hopkins School of Medicine.

== Career ==
Her short stories have appeared in The Alaska Quarterly Review, storySouth, Blackbird, Colorado Review, Mississippi Review, Shenandoah, and Joyland. In 2012, she won the Donald Justice Poetry Prize. Her short story "Mr. Forble" appeared in The Best American Mystery and Suspense in 2021. Her short story "Grand Mal" appeared in The Best American Short Stories in 2023. In May 2019, she published a collection of short stories, titled Every Human Love. In 2021, she was awarded the Drue Heinz Literature Prize for her second book of short stories, Now You Know It All. She was nominated for the Janet Heidinger Kafka Prize and a Virginia Literary Award. She was the only North Carolinian in South Arts' inaugural class of State Fellows for Literary Arts.

Her debut novel, Bright and Tender Dark, was published by Bloomsbury Press in 2024. The novel is a literary mystery.

Pearson also works as a psychiatrist.

== Personal life ==
Pearson lives in Carrboro, North Carolina with her husband and two children.
