= Mark Jarman =

American poet and critic

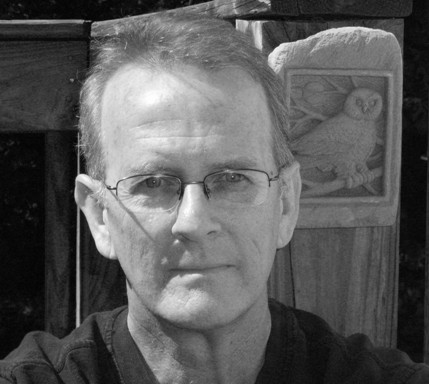
Mark Jarman

Mark F. Jarman (born in Mount Sterling, Kentucky) is an American poet and critic often identified with the New Narrative branch of the New Formalism; he was co-editor with Robert McDowell of The Reaper throughout the 1980s. Centennial Professor of English, Emeritus, at Vanderbilt University, he is the author of eleven books of poetry, three books of essays, and a book of essays co-authored with Robert McDowell. He co-edited the anthology Rebel Angels: 25 Poets of the New Formalism with David Mason.

Jarman's awards for poetry include a Joseph Henry Jackson Award, three grants from the NEA, and a fellowship from the John Simon Guggenheim Foundation. His book The Black Riviera won the 1991 Poets' Prize. Questions for Ecclesiastes was a finalist for the 1997 National Book Critics Circle Award in poetry and won the 1998 Lenore Marshall Poetry Prize from the Academy of American Poets and The Nation magazine. Bone Fires: New and Selected Poems won the 2013 Balcones Prize.

== Biography ==
Mark Jarman was born while his father, Donald R. Jarman, was in seminary in Lexington, Kentucky. His parents, both Californians, moved back to California in 1954 and settled in Santa Maria, where his father served First Christian Church. In 1958, responding to a call from his denomination, Mark's father moved his wife Bo Dee, his son, and daughter Katie, to Scotland to serve a small church in Kirkcaldy, Fife, a linoleum factory town on the Firth of Forth across from Edinburgh. The three years he spent there were formative ones for the poet. The family returned to California in 1961, where his father served South Bay Christian Church in Redondo Beach and his sister Luanne was born. In 1970, Jarman entered the University of California, Santa Cruz and earned a B.A. with highest honors in English literature in 1974. There he met his wife, soprano Amy Kane Jarman and his friend and long-time collaborator, Robert McDowell. While at U.C.S.C., he studied with the poet and editor George Hitchcock (poet) and the short story writer and poet Raymond Carver. In 1974, Jarman entered the Iowa Writers' Workshop and earned an M.F.A. in poetry in 1976. At Iowa he studied with Donald Justice, Charles Wright, Stanley Plumly, and Sandra McPherson. His classmates included poets Chase Twichell, Brenda Hillman, James Galvin, and Rita Dove. In 1976, he was hired to teach creative writing at Indiana State University in Evansville. In 1978, a grant from the National Endowment for the Arts allowed him to quit his job and live in Italy where Amy studied singing in Perugia. Returning to California in 1979, he was hired as a visiting writer at the University of California, Irvine. Mark and Amy's oldest daughter was born in Mission Viejo in 1980. That same year, Jarman took a position teaching creative writing at Murray State University in Kentucky. Two years later the couple's second daughter was born in Murray. In 1983, he left Murray State to teach at Vanderbilt University, where he has been since. Amy joined the voice faculty at the Blair School of Music in 1986. Since 2007, Jarman has been Centennial Professor of English at Vanderbilt and was Director of Creative Writing until 2013. In August 2020, he retired from Vanderbilt University and is now Centennial Professor of English Emeritus.

Jarman's early poetry reflects the influence of living by the Pacific and the North Sea at important times in his life, along with growing up in a strongly religious family. As he has matured, his poetry has remained invested in family experience, a sense of place, and the presence of God in everyday life. Though he is associated with the New Formalism, his poetry has always ranged widely in form and style, from narrative to lyric, free to metrical verse, verse to prose poetry.

== Honors ==
- Balcones Poetry Prize, 2013
- Lenore Marshall Poetry Prize of the Academy of American Poets, 1998
- Finalist, National Book Critics Circle Award, 1997, for poetry
- National Endowment for the Arts Grant, 1992, for poetry
- The Poets' Prize, 1991
- Guggenheim Fellow (Poetry), 1991–92
- Robert Frost Fellowship in poetry, The Bread Loaf Writers' Conference, 1985
- Crazyhorse prize for poetry published in the journal during the past year, 1985
- National Endowment for the Arts Grant, 1984, for poetry
- Duncan Lawrie Prize, Sotheby's International Poetry Competition, 1982
- National Endowment for the Arts Grant, 1977, for poetry
- Academy of American Poets Prize, 1975, The University of Iowa
- The Joseph Henry Jackson Award, 1974, from the San Francisco Foundation, for a manuscript of poetry

== Works ==
- North Sea, Cleveland State University Poetry Center, 1978, ISBN 978-0-914946-13-7
- The Rote Walker, Carnegie-Mellon University Press, 1981, ISBN 978-0-915604-58-6
- Far and Away, Carnegie-Mellon University Press, 1985, ISBN 978-0-88748-008-9
- The Black Riviera. Wesleyan University Press. 1990. ISBN 978-0-8195-1172-0. "Mark Jarman."
- Iris, Story Line Press, 1992, ISBN 978-0-934257-88-6
- Questions for Ecclesiastes, Story Line Press, 1997, ISBN 978-1-885266-41-5
- Unholy Sonnets, Story Line Press, 2000, ISBN 978-1-885266-87-3
- To the Green Man, Sarabande Books, 2004, ISBN 978-1-932511-03-1
- Epistles, Sarabande Books, 2007, ISBN 978-1-932511-53-6
- Bone Fires: New and Selected Poems, Sarabande Books, 2011, ISBN 978-1-932511-89-5
- The Heronry, Sarabande Books, 2017, ISBN 978-1941411353
- Zeno's Eternity, Paul Dry Books, 2023, ISBN 978-1589881709

=== Non-fiction ===
- The Reaper Essays, written with Robert McDowell (Story Line Press, 1996)
- Rebel Angels: 25 Poets of the New Formalism, (editor, with David Mason) (Story Line Press 1996)
- The Secret of Poetry, Story Line Press, 2001, ISBN 978-1-58654-005-0
- Body and Soul: Essays on Poetry, University of Michigan Press, 2002, ISBN 978-0-472-09802-6
- Dailiness:Essays on Poetry, Paul Dry Books, 2020, ISBN 978-1589881419
