= The New Formalist =

- Categories: New formalist poetry
- Frequency: Monthly
- Founded: 2001
- Final issue Number: 2010; IX
- Country: United States
- Language: English

The New Formalist was a United States–based literary periodical published (since 2001) monthly in electronic form and once a year in print form. Distributed by The New Formalist Press and edited by Leo Yankevich, it published many of the leading formal poets writing in English today. The magazine ceased publication in 2010.

Published poets included Jared Carter, Keith Holyoak, Alfred Dorn, T. S. Kerrigan, Richard T. Moore, and Frederick Turner.

The New Formalist also publishes The New Formalist E-book Series.

== See also ==
- Mezzo Cammin
- New Formalism
- The Formalist
