= Dick Allen (poet) =

American poet (1939–2017)

- Born: Richard Stanley Allen; August 8, 1939; Troy, New York, U.S.
- Died: December 26, 2017 (aged 78); Bridgeport, Connecticut, U.S.
- Occupations: Poet, literary critic
- Writing career
- Notable awards: Robert Frost Prize
- Literary movement: Expansive Poetry; Zen Poetry

Richard Stanley Allen (August 8, 1939 – December 26, 2017) was an American poet, literary critic and academic.

== Early life ==
The son of Richard Sanders Allen, a writer and historian, and Doris (née Bishop), a postmaster, Allen was educated at the College of Liberal Arts at Syracuse University (A.B. 1961), then at the Brown University graduate school (M.A. 1964), and subsequently undertook two years of post-Masters work.

== Career ==
Having been a teaching assistant at Brown whilst studying, he went on to teach creative writing and English literature at Wright State University from 1964 to 1968, then the University of Bridgeport. When he retired, he was the Charles A. Dana Endowed Chair Professor at the University of Bridgeport.

From July 1, 2010, through June 30, 2015, he served as Connecticut's poet laureate. During this time he wrote the poem "Solace" in remembrance of the victims of the shootings at the Sandy Hook Elementary School in Newton, CT. This poem was subsequently set to music by the composer William Bolcom.

Allen was co-editor of several anthologies of science fiction and science fiction criticism, and his book, Overnight in the Guest House of the Mystic, was a finalist for the 1984 National Book Critics Circle Award for Poetry. He was one of the founders of the Expansive Poetry movement. His influences included Ralph Waldo Emerson, A. E. Housman, Ben Jonson, Robert Frost.

His poems appeared in many journals, including Poetry, The Atlantic Monthly, The New Republic, The New Yorker, The American Poetry Review, Ploughshares, The Kenyon Review, The Hudson Review, The Massachusetts Review, The Yale Review, Boulevard, The Gettysburg Review, JuxtaProse Literary Magazine, and The New Criterion. Allen died on December 26, 2017, after a heart attack.

== Awards and recognition ==
- Finalist, National Book Critics Circle Award for Poetry, Overnight in the Guest House of the Mystic, 1984
- Robert Frost Prize
- Hart Crane Poetry Prize
- Pushcart Prize
- New Criterion Poetry Prize, This Shadowy Place, 2013.
- Poems included in:
  - The Best American Poetry volumes for 1991, 1994, 1998, 1999 and 2006
  - Scanning the Century: The Penguin Book of the Twentieth Century in Poetry (1999)
- Poetry writing fellowships:
  - National Endowment for the Arts
  - Ingram Merrill Foundation

== Bibliography ==
=== Poetry ===
Collections

- Allen, Dick (1971). Anon, and various time machine poems. New York: Delacorte Press.
- Regions With No Proper Names (St. Martin's Press, 1975)
- Overnight in the Guest House of the Mystic (Louisiana State University Press, 1984)
- Flight and Pursuit (Louisiana State University Press, 1987)
- Ode to the Cold War: Poems New and Selected (Sarabande, 1997)
- The Day Before: New Poems (Sarabande Books, 2003)
- Present Vanishing (Sarabande Books, 2008)
- This Shadowy Place (St. Augustines Press, 2014)
- Zen Master Poems (Wisdom Publications, 2016)

List of poems

Title	Year	First published	Reprinted/collected
Memo from the desk of Wallace Stevens:	1996	Allen, Dick (August 1996). "Memo from the desk of Wallace Stevens". The Atlantic Monthly. 278 (2): 64.	

== See also ==
- Expansive Poetry

== Sources ==
- Dick Allen

=== Poems online ===
- "For My 60th Birthday" and "Tone Poem In A Small Forest Clearing"
- "On Tenterhooks"
- "The Weeks Before"
- "The Lost Children", "Skeletonics for Poets and Others"
- "As If I Wasn't There"
- "Elvis," "Rats"
- "France"
- "Grandfather"
