= Susan McLean =

American poet

- Education: Harvard University (BA); Rutgers University (PhD)
- Occupations: Poet; translator; professor
- Writing career
- Notable awards: Richard Wilbur Award (2009); Donald Justice Poetry Prize (2014)

Susan McLean is an American poet, a translator of poetry, and a retired professor of English at Southwest Minnesota State University in Marshall, Minnesota.

She graduated from Harvard University with a BA in English in 1975 and from Rutgers University with a PhD in 1990. Her work has appeared in Kalliope, Atlanta Review, The Formalist, Iambs and Trochees, Arion, Measure, The Classical Outlook, Literary Imagination. She writes in the field of formalism. According to an interview with the Poetry Foundation, she describes her love of formalism as: " I am addicted to the esoteric pleasures of rhyme and meter, and I don’t even try to deny it or camouflage it with slant rhyme". She has been portrayed as a New Formalist by many if not most noted critics of her work.

== Awards ==
- 2015 Finalist, PEN Center USA Translation Award
- 2014 Donald Justice Poetry Prize
- 2009 Richard Wilbur Award
- 2006 the Leslie Mellichamp Prize from The Lyric
- 2004 McKnight Artist Fellowship/Loft Award in Poetry

== Works ==
- "Deep Cover"; "Desire"; "Hazard", Mezzo Cammin
- "Translations of Latin epigrams by Martial", The Chimaera, January 2008
- "Vanity: On a painting by Frank Cadogan Cowper", Eratosphere
- "Unscripted"; "Raw", Umbrella, Issue 2, 2007
- Translator, Martial, Selected Epigrams, University of Wisconsin Press, 2014, ISBN 978-0299301743
- Daylight Losing Time, Able Muse Press, 2026, ISBN 978-1773491486
- The Whetstone Misses the Knife, Story Line Press, 2014, ISBN 978-0996078207
- The Best Disguise, University of Evansville Press, 2009, ISBN 978-0-930982-68-3
- Holding Patterns, Finishing Line Press, 2006, ISBN 978-1-59924-096-1

=== Anthologies ===
- Currents of the Universal Being: Explorations in the Literature of Energy, Texas Tech University Press, 2015, ISBN 978-0896729285
- Irresistible Sonnets, Headmistress Press, 2014, ISBN 978-0615931517
- Villanelles, Everyman's Library, 2012, ISBN 978-0307957863
- The Best of The Barefoot Muse, Barefoot Muse Press, 2011, ISBN 978-0615570730
- The Cento: A Collection of Collage Poems, Red Hen Press, 2011, ISBN 978-1597091329
- Hot Sonnets, Entasis Press, 2011, ISBN 978-0980099997
- Kiss and Part: Laughing at the End of Romance and Other Entanglements, Doggerel Daze Press, 2005, ISBN 978-0972282024
- Sonnets: 150 Contemporary Sonnets University of Evansville Press, 2005, ISBN 978-0-930982-59-1
