= Measure (journal) =

International poetry journal

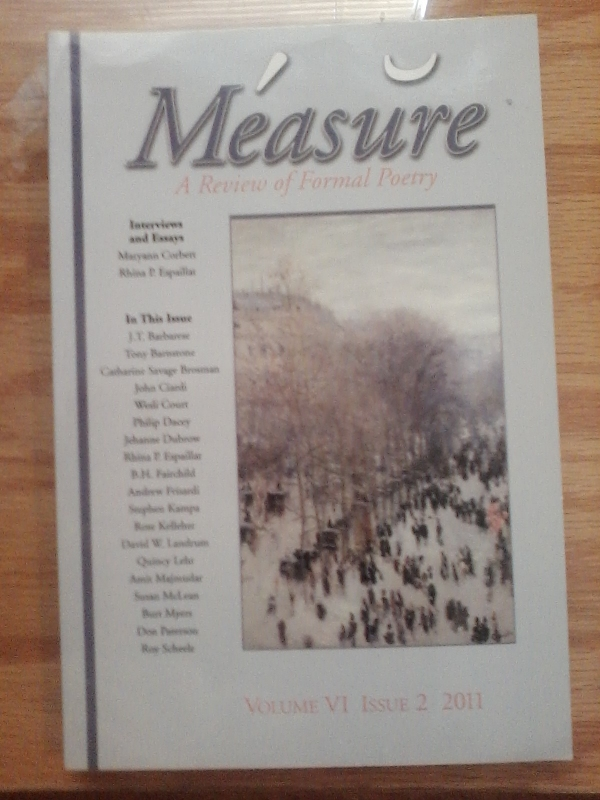
- Volume VI Issue 2
- Frequency: Semiannual (2005-2018), weekly 2018-
- Format: Print (2005-2018), electronic 2018-
- Publisher: University of Evansville
- Founded: 2005
- Final issue: 2018 (print)
- Country: United States
- Based in: Evansville, Indiana, U.S.
- Language: English
- Website: https://measurereview.org
- ISSN: 1555-4791
- OCLC: 58808724

Measure is an international journal of formal poetry. It was founded by Paul Bone and Rob Griffith in 2005, following the demise of The Formalist. Measure is published by Measure Press and funded in part by the University of Evansville. The journal features poetry, critical essays, and interviews. Notable past contributors include Kelly Cherry, Rachel Hadas, Allison Joseph, Derek Walcott, Richard Wilbur, and many others.

The print magazine ceased publication in 2018, although Measure Press continued. An electronic journal, Measure Review: A Magazine of Formal Poetry, continues.

== See also ==
- Howard Nemerov Sonnet Award
- Donald Justice Poetry Prize
- New Formalism
