= The Reaper (magazine) =

American literary periodical

The Reaper was a United States literary periodical which played an important role in establishing the poetry movements of New Narrative and New Formalism. It was founded in 1980 and ran until 1989; a double issue of numbers 19 and 20 was the last. The Reaper was founded and edited by Robert McDowell and Mark Jarman. It was started at Indiana State University. For the earlier issues the art director was Michael K. Aakhus; for later issues Thomas Wilhelmus served as fiction editor.

Donald Hall contributed a review of the first ten issues in Issue 10. The piece was entitled 'Reaping the Reaper'. His first paragraph runs: "Most poems in the first ten issues of The Reaper are bad. Many are bad in familiar ways." But he went on to say the magazine "is an encouraging phenomenon because it howls with dissatisfaction."
