= Tampa Review =

American literary journal

- Discipline: Literary journal
- Language: English
- Edited by: Richard Mathews

Publication details
- Former name: Tampa Poetry Review
- History: 1964-present
- Publisher: The University of Tampa (United States)
- Frequency: Biannual

Standard abbreviations
- ISO 4: Tampa Rev.

Indexing
- ISSN: 0896-064X (print); 2326-4101 (web)

Links
- Journal homepage; Project MUSE

Tampa Review is a literary magazine produced at The University of Tampa in Tampa, Florida. It was founded in 1964 as the Tampa Poetry Review and changed to its current name in 1988.

Tampa Review has been instrumental in promoting Florida-based writers such as Lisbeth Kent, Judith Hemsshemeyer, Lola Haskins, and Dionisio Martinez in the national stage. Work that has appeared in the journal has also been reprinted in The Best American Poetry series and has won the Pushcart Prize. Nationally known writers whose work has appeared in the journal include Amina Gautier, Robert Dana, Margaret Gibson, Peter Meinke, Enid Shomer, Jacob Appel and Samrat Upadhyay.

In 1995, the Council of Editors of Learned Journals awarded the Tampa Review its Phoenix Award for "significant editorial achievement."

== Masthead ==
- Editor: Richard Mathews
- Fiction Editors: Andrew Plattner, Yuly Restrepo
- Nonfiction Editor: Daniel Dooghan, Elizabeth Winston
- Poetry Editor: Erica Dawson
- Editorial Assistants: Sean Donnelly, Joshua Steward
- Staff Assistant: Megan C. Wiedeman
- Contributing & Consulting Editor: J. M. Lennon

== See also ==
- List of literary magazines
