= Mezzo Cammin =

Semiannual literary journal focusing on past eras

Mezzo Cammin is a semiannual online literary journal devoted to formalist poetry by contemporary women as well as to bring attention back to work that was more famous in previous eras. The journal's title comes from Judith Moffett's poem "Mezzo Cammin", which in turn takes its title from the opening line of the famous Italian poet Dante Alighieri's Inferno. The journal was associated for a long time with the West Chester University Poetry Conference. The founding editor in chief was Kim Bridgford. Its advisory board consists of well-known poets such as Annie Finch, Allison Joseph, Marilyn Nelson, and Molly Peacock. Since Kim Bridgford's death in June 2020, the journal has been edited by Anna M. Evans.

== History ==
The first issue of the journal came out in the summer of 2006. It was created in response to "the tendency that persists in academia of choosing the work of male poets to define a given era or literary style".

Mezzo Cammin emerged from community of women poets at the West Chester University Poetry Conference. The magazine was also affiliated with Fairfield University early on. In 2010, Kim Bridgford, Mezzo Cammin's editor in chief, became the director of the WCU Poetry Center 2010. The magazine affirmed its link with West Chester in its Fifth Anniversary Issue.

== Women Poets Timeline Project ==
Launched on March 27 at the National Museum of Women in the Arts in Washington, DC, the Mezzo Cammin Women Poets Timeline Project is expected to become the world's largest database of women poets. The date of the launch was symbolically chosen to be at the end of Women's History Month, just before National Poetry Month.

The database started with information about 15 women poets, which will be expanded over time. The project will include biographical articles of the poets, including photographs and reprints of their work when possible. One of the early challenges of the project has been the obtaining of copyright permission for the republishing of works online.

== See also ==
- New Formalism, the movement to revive formalism in poetry
- New Formalist, a literary journal devoted to all formalist poetry
