= Frederick Turner (poet) =

English–American poet

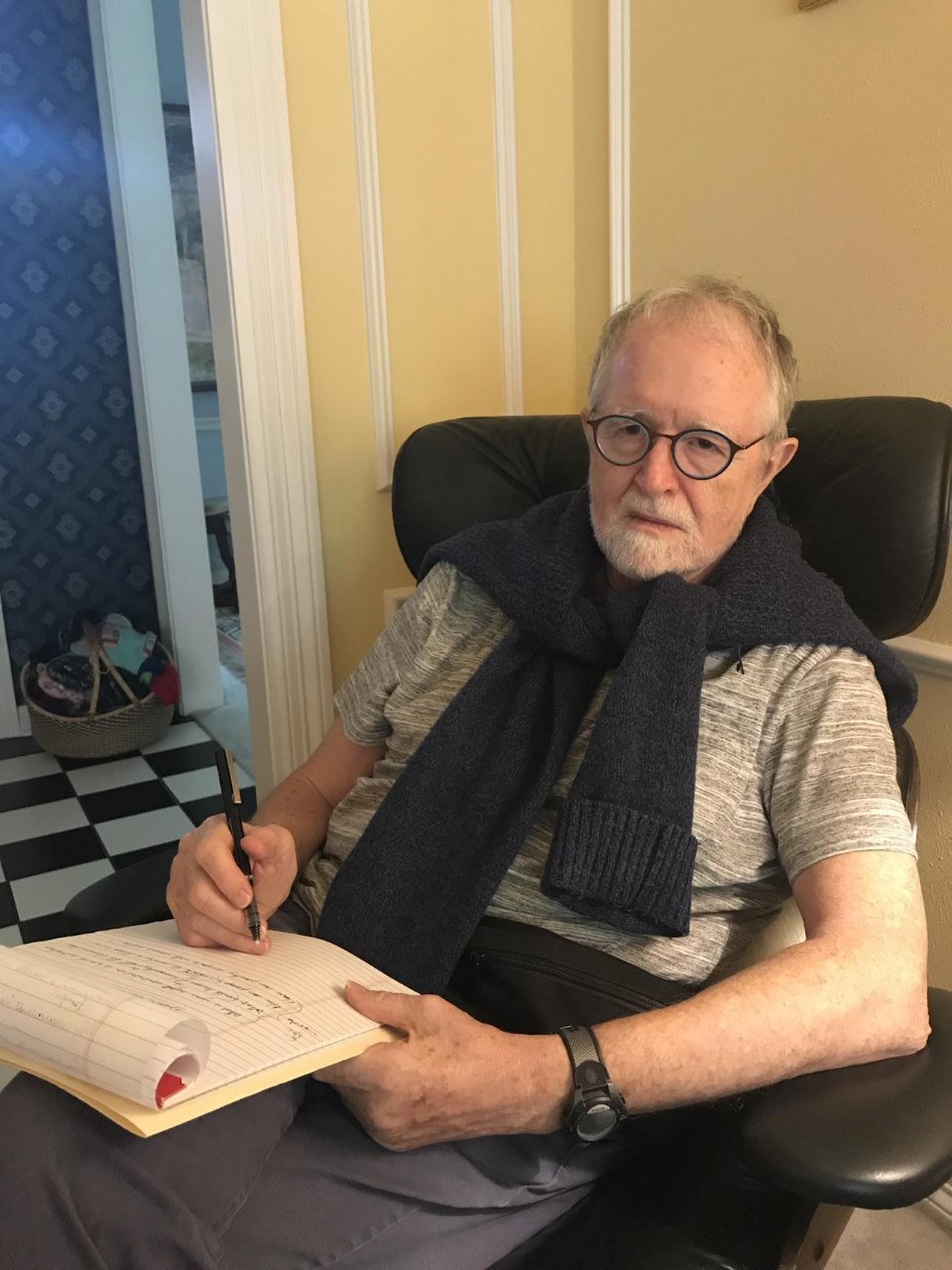
- Turner in 2023
- Born: November 19, 1943 (age 82); Northamptonshire, England
- Education: University of Oxford
- Occupations: Poet, critic, professor
- Writing career
- Notable works: The New World; Genesis; Apocalypse
- Notable awards: Milán Füst Prize; Levinson Poetry Prize; PEN Dallas Golden Pen Award
- Movement: New Formalism

Frederick Turner (born 19 November, 1943) is an English‑American poet, literary critic, and translator known for his association with the New Formalism movement. He has published over 25 books, including the verse epics The New World (1985), Genesis (1988), and Apocalypse (2016), as well as critical studies such as Shakespeare and the Nature of Time and The Culture of Hope. Turner taught at the University of Texas at Dallas from 1985 until his retirement as Founders Professor in 2020.

== Early life and education ==
Born in Northamptonshire, England, Turner is the son of Scottish cultural anthropologist Victor Witter Turner and English anthropologist Edith Turner. He has four siblings. His brothers include scientist Robert Turner, and anthropologist Rory Turner, who teaches at Goucher College in Towson, Maryland.

In an interview with William Baer, Turner recalled that "[his] father wanted to be a poet," but chose to be an anthropologist to provide for his family. Turner added: "He used to say to me that I'd become a poet because he'd always wanted to be one."

=== Childhood in Africa ===
In 1952, Turner's father accepted an assignment funded by the Rhodes-Livingstone Institute to study the Eastern Ndembu people of Northern Rhodesia. While talking with Baer, Turner recalled the voyage: "...it was a marvelous seven days on the ocean, sailing down the Atlantic Ocean and seeing Ascension Island and all the other sights along the way."

Turner further recalls, "In Africa, we lived mostly in grass huts. They were wonderful, with a smoky hay kind of smell ... We would truck in supplies occasionally, and there was a small trading center called Mwinilunga, which had a few stores. We also bought a lot of bush meat, mostly goat and antelope, from the local people."

While growing up in Africa, Turner was home schooled by his parents. He recalls, "My parents had the addresses of several secondhand bookstores — which had various catalogues — so we ordered from Africa. As a boy, I read all the politically incorrect books! Lots of Kipling and Rider Haggard and all of Stevenson, like Treasure Island and The Master of Ballantrae."

When asked if these were the books his father read aloud in the evenings, Turner replied, "Yes, and then I would reread them by myself: The Swiss Family Robinson, Kim, and The Jungle Book, of course. Later on, when it started coming out, he read us The Lord of the Rings series. I think he read it three times, and then I read it five or six more times on my own. Eventually, we also read C.S. Lewis' Narnia, John Buchan, Arthur Conan Doyle, some Dickens, and lots of Shakespeare." Turner also grew up listening to the Chishimukulu stories from the Ndembu oral tradition.

On many Sundays, the Turner family would drive by truck to the Zambezi River rapids, a sight that Turner missed terribly once they returned to England.

Turner has also spoken about his parents: "They went there as traditional, structuralist, functionalist anthropologists with a Marxist background. They were both atheists, and I was raised as a good atheist and Humanist — very idealistic, always believing in the brotherhood of man. Their primary interest was studying the structure of roles, statuses, and relationships — kinship — in the culture, and seeing them as a system for survival. They had expected to find that economic factors would be the primary forces in the culture, but they discovered, instead, that it was really ideology, ideas, religion, ritual, and ritual symbolism that were running the society ... So my parents were struck with the power of religion and ritual in the Ndembu culture, and they became world renowned experts on those subjects."

In 1955, Victor Turner returned to England with his family upon accepting a position at the University of Manchester.

On returning to England, Turner states: "I greatly missed the African people, especially my closest friends, who were all Ndembu boys. There was one boy in particular named Sakeru — who is now, I understand, a Colonel in the Zambian Air Force — and he was the leader of our group. He ran around virtually naked, but he was a great hunter and a great trapper, and he was absolutely admirable. He seemed so perfect at everything he did and I missed him and all the others when we got to Manchester. I also missed the tribal rituals. The Ndembu were a ritual people, and my friends and I always hung around for the tribal rituals which were perfectly fascinating. My parents, of course, were studying the rituals, so I got to witness many of them, and sometimes even participate. Once I was actually initiated into some kind of cult, but the most fascinating of all were the women's puberty rituals. We boys were never allowed to attend, but we did our best to sneak around, although we were often driven away with terrible curses by the elderly women. What went on in those rituals was absolutely fascinating – and my mother has written about it rather extensively."

=== Education ===
Turner's early education was at Manchester Grammar School, a private all-boys school based in Manchester, England.

Between 1962 and 1967, Turner attended the University of Oxford, where he obtained a B.A., M.A., and B.Litt. in English Language and Literature. At Oxford, Turner's thesis supervisor was Helen Gardner. Turner's other examiners were Lord David Cecil and John Bayley, the husband of novelist Iris Murdoch.

The title of Turner's thesis was Shakespeare and the Nature of Time, and the thesis was later published at Gardner's insistence.

In his 1995 book, The Culture of Hope, Turner criticized the Counterculture of the 1960s, writing, "When one seeks for radical equality, and a total pruning of the tree of authority, one gets an Oliver Cromwell, a Napoleon Bonaparte, a Hitler, a Lenin, a Stalin instead. In recent times, the egalitarian commune movement has given birth to such monstrosities as Charlie Manson and Jimmy Jones. Any of us who were involved in radical consciousness-raising groups in the sixties, seventies, and eighties can remember the oppressive atmosphere of thought control and authority, the way in which some unacknowledged leader emerged supported by a little coterie of moral enforcers and yes-men, and the bullying of the weak or independent."

After moving to the United States and working there, he was naturalized as a U.S. citizen in 1977.

== Marriage and family ==
Turner has been married to Mei Lin Turner since 1966. The two met as a fellow undergraduate at Oxford University. He has two sons.

According to William Baer, Turner has "written numerous love poems" addressed to his wife, such as The Mei Lin Effect.

== Career ==
After receiving his doctorate, Turner worked as an assistant professor at the University of California, Santa Barbara from 1967 to 1972. Soon after his arrival in California in 1967, Turner's doctoral thesis, Shakespeare and the Nature of Time, was published as a book and attracted the attention of Hungarian-American philosopher and physicist Julius Thomas Fraser, who invited Turner to join the International Society for the Study of Time. While visiting Austria and attending one of the Society's triennial conferences alongside many Nobel Prize-winning scholars from different disciplines, Turner became involved with a group of scholars interested in the neurobiology of aesthetics. Ranging from musicians to physicists, the group questioned why and how humans were able to perceive beauty across cultures. Of the phenomena, Turner said: "Once we had the facts at our disposal, it was impossible to entertain any of these post-structuralist notions that such human forms and conventions are simply closed systems and culturally unique. In fact, it was clear that human aesthetics rose from human biology." After a grant from the Werner Reimers, the group began to meet over a nine-year period.

During the early 2000s, James Matthew Wilson wrote, "Turner has spent several decades engaged on a consciously syncretistic quest to draw the findings of neuroscience, physics, anthropology, and Eastern and Western religions into a coherent vision of culture and the world as they shape and are shaped by human nature. As Turner argued in A Culture of Hope (1995), this quest is neither liberal nor conservative, but one that shares the best insights of both. He views liberalism and capitalism as indicative of human nature's dynamic, iconoclastic, yet inventive, culture-making character. While he agrees with conservatives that the cultural productions that most befit human nature will always be classical in character, he believes that human choices renovate classicism in every age. The argument for this position was first set forth in the aptly titled Natural Classicism (1986)..."

After leaving Santa Barbara, Turner worked as an associate professor at Kenyon College between 1972 and 1985. Between 1979 and 1983, Turner and Ronald Sharp served as editors of The Kenyon Review, where they published the poems and essays of the first New Formalist poets.

Meanwhile, Turner and Ernst Pöppel, psychologist and neuroscientist of the Max Planck Institute in Munich, West Germany, reported findings that prove, according to William Baer, "that regular rhythm actually induces the brain to release pleasure-creating endorphins."

Of both his research and friendship with Ernst Pöppel, Turner has said, "Now Ernst had already been a member of the Time Society, so we'd known each other for quite a while, and we used to hang out in the bar and talk about all sorts of things. At the same time, I'd already embarked on a serious study of world meter, and I'd noticed that all human societies had poetry, that it was always divided into lines, and that, even in pre-literate societies, all the lines were about three seconds long. Ernst had similarly noticed that humans have a three second cycle in which we hear and understand language... So there was clearly some kind of three-second phenomenon going on. Then we hooked up with a group of bio-genetic structuralists who'd been studying, for instance, the neurophysiology of ritual chants, and we'd examined the effects of ritual chanting and learned that ritual chanting produces significant changes in the brain waves, so we started to put a lot of things together, and we wrote that essay."

In 1985, Turner and Pöppel published their findings in the award-winning essay The Neural Lyre: Poetic Meter, the Brain, and Time in the magazine Poetry.

Turner also worked as a visiting professor at the University of Exeter in England from 1985 until 1986. From 1986 until his retirement in September 2020, Turner was Founders Professor of Arts and Humanities at the University of Texas at Dallas.

== Writing ==
As a poet, Turner favors longer genres, narrative, science fiction, and strict metrical forms.

He is a winner of the Milán Füst Prize (shared with Zsuzsanna Ozsváth) and the Levinson Poetry Prize, awarded by Poetry Magazine (1983). He has been described as "a universal scholar — a rare find in a world of over-specialization — whose work transects and borrows from several rather disparate fields."

=== Epic poetry ===
Turner has published three epic poems, which are also science fiction novels in verse.

When asked about his decision to write epic poetry, Turner replied, "People are willing to read novels, and they're willing to read the classic epics. I suspect that Robert Fitzgerald's wonderful translation of The Odyssey has been read by as many people as most contemporary novels. So I don't think that there's anything wrong with the form itself; it's rather a problem of old-fashioned expectations, along with the general incompetence with which it's usually done in our times — when it's done at all. Also, the perceived difficulty of modern poetry is a problem. If readers struggle with a short modern poem, they'll often dread the idea of reading a 200-page poem, but if it's crafted correctly and really tells a story, then it isn't a problem. You can read Fitzgerald's Odyssey more easily than most novels, it's much more direct."

==== The New World ====
Turner published his first poem, The New World, in 1985, which celebrates world culture in the year 2376 A.D.

According to James Matthew Wilson, Turner's vision of the future in The New World, "is at once dystopian and utopian. The quest to exploit natural resources and develop advanced technology has led to the fragmentation of nation states into hostile, tribal factions, but it has also led some of these factions to attain a high level of civilization."

Also, according to Wilson, "Entire segments of the American population, dubbed 'Riots', now live as 'liberated' crazed addicts of drugs and violence, others lose themselves in a fundamentalist Christian Jihad. And yet, it seems that these developments allow Turner to dramatize a theme that has come to be a focus of much of his work: the way in which nature, the material world, shapes and is shaped by the cultural made world."

In his introduction to The New World, Turner explains he drew from previous literature such as Homer's Odyssey, sharing the theme of "a man who must struggle to return home and claim his family from his enemies." Like Njal's Saga, The New World tells of, "a tragic family feud", and, like Wolfram von Eschenbach's Parsifal, "it is not the hero's prowess, but his questions that enable him to find the Grail." From the Bhagavad Gita, Turner drew the plotline in which, "a hero weary of war is able to reconcile his duty with his knowledge." Turner also admitted to drawing upon the life story of Queen Elizabeth I of England, as well as the history of the American Civil War, and the legends and literature of the American Frontier.

Turner further explained that he intended The New World to celebrate American culture, in the same way that Beowulf did for "Nordic culture," and that the epics of Homer and Virgil did for the culture of ancient Greece and Imperial Rome.

When his epic was reprinted in 2011, Turner included a foreword written after rereading his work. Turner commented that, unlike the works of Isaac Asimov and most other science fiction writers of the 1970s and '80s, The New World had correctly predicted that the Soviet Union would collapse without the mass destruction of a nuclear war. Turner further commented, "The poem's identification of fanatical authoritarian monotheistic fundamentalism (Christian and Islamic) as engaged in a struggle with mindless hedonism on the one side and free democratic syncretism on the other seems pretty much on target."

==== Genesis ====
Turner's second epic is the 1990 poem Genesis, which is heavily influenced by Greek Mythology and is about the human colonization of Mars. Genesis has not only, according to Turner, done well in terms of sales, "it's even been adopted by NASA."

In 1990, Kim Stanley Robinson wrote of Turner's epic, "[It] doesn't seem like an epic poem about the terraforming of Mars, using characters modeled partly on Greek mythology, would be a recipe for success. But Turner is an exceptionally skillful poet, who when he wrote this book had already completed a fascinating Mars novel, A Double Shadow (1978), and another fine book-length narrative poem, The New World (1985). Here, the Olympian grandeur of the characters and plot match well with the Martian landscape, which under its rapid terraforming is still recognizably a place established in the popular imagination by the Viking landers. The result is a triumph that deserves to be better known."

==== Apocalypse ====
Turner's third epic poem, Apocalypse, concerns humanity's attempts to respond to climate change in 2067. It was published in 2016.

=== Literary translation ===
In a 1992 collection of translated poems by Miklós Radnóti, a Hungarian Jewish war poet, convert to Roman Catholicism, and critic of the Arrow Cross Party, who the Royal Hungarian Army murdered during the Holocaust, Turner's co-translator was Zsuzsanna Ozsváth, a Hungarian Jewish refugee who carried a volume of Radnóti's poems in her winter-coat pocket in March 1957, when she fled from her parents' home in Budapest and defected to the West following the defeat of the Hungarian Revolution of 1956.

In a subsequent interview, William Baer asked about the collection, and Turner responded, "One day, one of Radnóti's friends saw him on the streets of Budapest, and the poet was mumbling something like, 'Du-duh-du-duh-du-duh,' and his friend said, 'Don't you understand?! Hitler is invading Poland!' And Radnóti supposedly answered, 'Yes, but this is the only thing I have to fight with.' As his poetry makes clear, Radnóti believed that Fascism was the destruction of order. It both destroyed and vulgarized civil society. It was as if you wanted to create an ideal cat, so you took your cat, killed it, removed its flesh, put it into some kind of mold, and then pressed it into the shape of a cat. That's what Fascism does, and that's what Communism does. They both destroy an intricate social order to set up a criminally simple-minded order."

About his work with Zsuzsanna Ozsváth, Turner said, "Well, we made an agreement right from the start that we would maintain the Hungarian formats. We also wanted to capture the sound of the Hungarian, which is quite unusual. Fortunately, Hungarian poets use a lot of meters and forms that we also use. Iambs and sonnets, for example, but the language has many more trochees and dactyls, and the Hungarians often combine the two rhythms in fascinating ways, and ways that work extremely well in English. As George Steiner once said, Hungarian poems shouldn't sound like American poems. So we worked hard to create the Hungarian sounds."

When asked about his translations of Chinese poetry, particularly poems dating from the Tang dynasty, Turner commented, "That was quite a bit more difficult, but eventually I realized that the Chinese syllable is roughly equivalent to two syllables in English, and that made things much easier. Chinese poetry needs to be recited much slower than English poetry, and when a line of Chinese poetry has five syllables, it will probably take ten syllables to render it into English. Whenever I translate, whether from the Hungarian or the Chinese, I always listen to the poem recited first. Then I write a 'score' for the poem, marking stresses, and the rhyme scheme, and the cadence, and so forth."

=== Religious poetry ===
When asked about his own Christian poetry, Turner said, "In the 20th century, it became more and more frowned on to advertise your religious views. Partly it was a reaction against the 'tolerant hypocrisy' of the Victorians, but the primary reason, of course, was the intellectual fashion of the death of God. You really couldn't be a respectable thinker unless you made an act of faith that there is nothing but matter in the world. We now know, of course, from countless scientific discoveries, that matter itself has a relatively late appearance in the universe, and if the universe looks like anything, it looks like a gigantic thought, which Eddington claimed a long time ago. The best metaphor for the universe is not a gigantic machine, but rather a thought, which from a theological point of view is perfectly reasonable. But there's still a lot of pressure to conform in the arts and academia, and it also has professional ramifications. People could certainly lose their jobs for expressing themselves like Hopkins, Dickinson, or Milton – or they wouldn't get those jobs in the first place."

== Awards and honours ==
- Milán Füst Prize (Hungary)
- Levinson Poetry Prize, Poetry magazine
- PEN Dallas Chapter Golden Pen Award
- Missouri Review Editors’ Prize
- David Robert Poetry Prize
- Gjenima Prize

== Reviews and commentary ==
- "In Hadean Eclogues, Frederick Turner..., an interdisciplinary scholar and devotee of the classics, searches for a modern Arcadia, the sacred and taboo gateway between heaven and Earth that inspired the poets of old. He finds it in a startling place – the emerging suburbs in the cities of his adopted home, Texas." --Minneapolis Star-Tribune
