= Expansive Poetry =

Expansive Poetry is a movement in United States poetry that began in the 1980s. It is an umbrella term coined by Wade Newman for the movements of New Formalism and New Narrative, and the term is controversial even among many of the writers it purports to describe. Although more New Formalism and New Narrative poets have gained prominence in recent years, as evidenced by the number of books and anthologies they have published and the rapid expansion of the West Chester University Poetry Conference, the term "Expansive Poetry" is increasingly rarely used.

== See also ==
- New Formalism
