= William Baer (writer) =

American poet

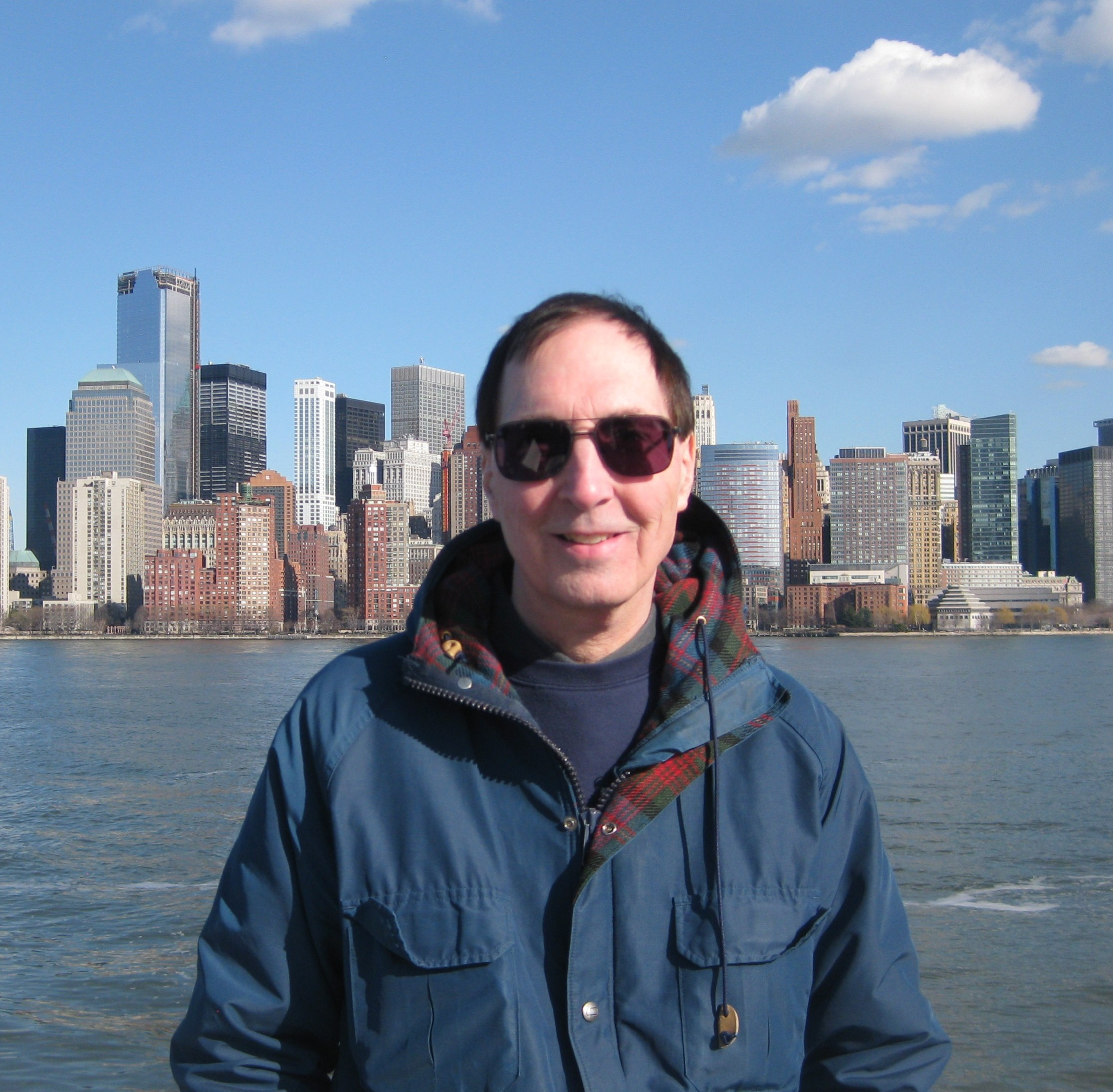
- Born: December 29, 1948 (age 77); Geneva, New York
- Education: Rutgers University (B.A.); New York University (M.A.); University of South Carolina (Ph.D); Johns Hopkins University (M.A.); University of Southern California (M.A.)
- Occupations: Writer, Translator, Editor, Professor
- Writing career
- Literary movement: New Formalism
- Website: www.williambaer.net

William Baer (born December 29, 1948) is an American writer, translator, editor, and academic. He has been the recipient of a Guggenheim Fellowship, a Fulbright (Portugal), and a Creative Writing Fellowship from the National Endowment for the Arts.

== Early life and education ==
William Baer was born in Geneva, New York, in 1948. He was raised in The Bronx, New York City, and Wayne, New Jersey. After graduating from Rutgers University with a B.A. in English, he received an M.A. in English from New York University. He completed his doctoral dissertation in English at the University of South Carolina under the direction of James Dickey, before attending the Johns Hopkins Writing Seminars where he earned an M.A. in Creative Writing, working under David St. John and John Barth. He also graduated from the USC School of Cinematic Arts with an M.A. in Cinema, receiving the Jack Nicholson Screenwriting Award.

== Literary activities (Poetry) ==
Baer is the author of seven books of poetry, including Formal Salutations: New & Selected Poems; The Unfortunates, recipient of the T. S. Eliot Prize from Truman State University; "Borges" and Other Sonnets; and "Bocage" and Other Sonnets, recipient of the X. J. Kennedy Poetry Prize. His other books include translations from the Portuguese, Luís de Camões: Selected Sonnets; the textbook, Writing Metrical Poetry; and three collections of poet interviews.

William Baer was the founding editor of The Formalist (1990–2004), a small poetry journal which played a significant role in the Formalist poetry revival (New Formalism). He also served as the poetry editor and film critic for Crisis Magazine, the founding director of the St. Robert Southwell Institute, the director of the University of Evansville Press, the faculty director of The Evansville Review, and the founding director of the Richard Wilbur Poetry Series, the Howard Nemerov Sonnet Award, and the Willis Barnstone Translation Prize.

== Literary activities (Fiction) ==
William Baer’s fiction has been awarded a Creative Writing Grant from the National Endowment for the Arts. He is the author of fifteen novels in widely divergent genres, including literary, mystery, love-themed, and Catholic-themed. He is also the author of two collections of short stories, Times Square and Other Stories and One-and-Twenty Tales, and his short fiction has been published in numerous literary journals, including The Iowa Review, Arkansas Review, The Chariton Review, and The Dalhousie Review.

== Literary activities (Theater) ==
William Baer's various plays have been produced at more than thirty American theaters, including the 13th Street Theatre in New York City, Chicago Dramatists, and the Metropolitan Playhouse of New York. His full-length drama, Three Generations of Imbeciles, received the New Works of Merit Playwriting Award and was chosen for the regionals of the 2013 American College Theatre Festival. His play Lighthouse, the recipient of the AACT NewPlayFest Award, premiered at the Windsor Playhouse in Windsor, Colorado.

== Literary activities (Cinema) ==
William Baer is a graduate of the School of Cinematic Arts at the University of Southern California (M.A.), where he received the Jack Nicholson Screenwriting Award. He also taught screenwriting at U.S.C. for three years, was represented by Stuart Robinson of Robinson, Weintraub, and Gross, optioned a screenplay, and directed an MTV music video. He subsequently taught cinema history and screenwriting at the University of Evansville in southwest Indiana. His two related books are Classic American Films: Conversations with the Screenwriters and Elia Kazin: Interviews.

== Selected Awards ==
- Guggenheim Fellowship
- N.E.A. Creative Writing Fellowship in Fiction
- Fulbright Lectureship in American Literature, Portugal
- Jack Nicholson Screenwriting Award
- T. S. Eliot Prize (Truman State University)
- AACT NewPlayFest Award
- X.J. Kennedy Poetry Prize
- New Works of Merit Playwriting Award
- James H. Wilson Playwriting Award
- Melvin M. Peterson Chair in Literature

== Selected books ==
- Equinox, Winged Publications, 2024
- Murder in Nashville, Many Words Press, 2024
- The Sweet Science, Winged Publications, 2024
- Mary Pickford Mystery, Winged Publications, 2024
- Jacinta, Many Words Press, 2024
- Annie Oakley Mystery, Winged Publications, 2024
- Central Park, Winged Publications, 2024
- The Gravedigger, Winged Publications, 2024
- Advocatus Diaboli, Many Words Press, 2023
- Murder in Times Square, Many Words Press, 2022
- New Jersey Noir: Barnegat Light, Able Muse Press, 2022
- New Jersey Noir: Cape May, Able Muse Press, 2021
- Formal Salutations: New & Selected Poems, Measure Press, 2019
- New Jersey Noir, Able Muse Press, 2018
- Companion, James Ward Kirk Publishing, 2017
- Thirteen on Form: Conversations with Poets, Measure Press, 2016
- AACT NewPlayFest, Volume Two, containing Lighthouse, Dramatic Publishing, 2016
- Love Sonnets, Kelsay Books, 2016
- Times Square and Other Stories, Able Muse Press, 2015
- One-and-Twenty Tales, Mockingbird Lane Press, 2015
- Psalter, Truman State University Press, 2011
- "Bocage" and Other Sonnets, Texas Review Press, 2008
- Classic American Films: Conversations with the Screenwriters, Praeger, 2007
- Rhyming Poems: A Contemporary Anthology, University of Evansville Press, 2007
- The Ballad Rode into Town, Turning Point, 2007
- Writing Metrical Poetry, Writer's Digest Books, 2006, Measure Press, 2015
- The Conservative Poets, University of Evansville Press, 2006
- Luís de Camões: Selected Sonnets, University of Chicago Press, 2005
- Sonnets: 150 Sonnets, University of Evansville Press, 2005
- Fourteen on Form: Conversations with Poets, University Press of Mississippi, 2004
- "Borges" and Other Sonnets, Truman State University Press, 2003
- Elia Kazan: Interviews, University Press of Mississippi, 2000
- The Amistad Case, Eldridge Publishing, 1998
- The Unfortunates, Truman State University Press, 1997
- Conversations with Derek Walcott, University Press of Mississippi, 1996
