= New Formalism =

Movement in American poetry

New Formalism is a late 20th- and early 21st-century movement in American poetry that has promoted a return to metrical, rhymed verse and narrative poetry on the grounds that all three are necessary if American poetry is to compete with novels and regain its former popularity among the American people.

== Background ==
The formal innovations of Modernist poetry, inspired by Walt Whitman and popularized by Ezra Pound, Edgar Lee Masters, and T.S. Eliot, led to the widespread publication of free verse during the early 20th century. By the 1920s, debates about the value of free verse versus formal poetry were filling the pages of American literary journals.

Meanwhile, many poets chose to continue working predominantly in traditional forms, such as Robert Frost, Richard Wilbur, and Anthony Hecht. Formal verse also continued being written by American poets associated with the New Criticism, including John Crowe Ransom, Robert Penn Warren and Allen Tate.

During the 1950s, the second coming of "The Free Verse Revolution" was inspired by the writings of Beat Generation poets Allen Ginsberg, Kenneth Rexroth, and of Imagist poet William Carlos Williams. The Second Free Verse Revolution also introduced into American poetry, according to Frederick Feirstein and Frederick Turner, the Silent Generation's much wider "revolt against the social conventions of Puritan America", which was reflected by the Greaser subculture of the era and the Rock and Roll music of Chuck Berry, Little Richard, Bill Haley, and Elvis Presley.

As a result, it became more expected for poets to experiment and, with the rise of Confessional poetry, the writing and publication of autobiographical and nonprosodic verse, often with a liberal political bent, became fashionable. As often happens in literature and the arts, however, what had begun as an anti-establishment counterculture seeking freedom from constraint hardened over time into a literary elite that opposed innovation and expressed hostility to both older and younger poets who refused to conform to its dictates.

According to Feirstein and Turner,

"It is hard to imagine in 1989 how narrow and doctrinaire was the world of poetry in the seventies when the poets in the movement began to mature. Both narrative and meter were considered at best out of date and at worst the instruments of bourgeois capitalism. Ignoring the strict meter and narrative impulses of blues and country and western lyrics, the high priests of the ruling ideology proclaimed that narrative and meter were elitist European importations and that the true American voice could only be heard in free verse. These views went together with a pose of the poet as resenting and rebelling against the poets cultural past and that of society at large. Although he or she invariably taught in a university, the poseurs would express profound hostility to the intellectual imagination, especially in the forms of science and technology, and a sentimental preference for nature over culture. The poseurs often would be gleefully pessimistic about the future which would seem to justify their solipsistic confessions about their darkly perceived past."

In an essay that he admitted was similarly intended to provoke, R.S. Gwynn wrote in similar terms about American poetry of the 1970s,

"The tribal music of Poetryland -- the murky manifestos of Projective Verse and breath-units, the proliferation of cut-rate knock-offs of Howl and Daddy, the shamanism of the Deep Image and the multiform brain -- had begun to resemble ritualized incantations, mumbled by the multitudes of but comprehended by few, and a sense emerged that certain types of poetry had overstayed their welcome."

An early sign of a revival of interest in traditional poetic forms was the publication of Lewis Turco's The Book of Forms: A Handbook of Poetics in 1968. In the early 1970s X. J. Kennedy started publishing the short-lived magazine Counter/Measures which was devoted to the use of traditional form in poetry. A few other editors around this time were sympathetic to formal poetry, but the mainstream continued to oppose rhyme and meter.

Meanwhile, aspiring Formalist poets from both the Silent and Baby Boomer Generations were still able to attend classes taught by older professors, including Yvor Winters, Robert Fitzgerald, and Elizabeth Bishop, who continued to teach both literary criticism and the craft of writing poetry in a more traditional way.

In a 2021 interview, Dana Gioia said that while New Formalism and New Narrative are the most controversial responses in American poetry to the Second Free Verse Revolution, they are only one facet of an enormous grassroots movement. Gioia elaborates,

"If I go back to 1975 when I was leaving Harvard, I was told by the world experts in poetry that rhyme and meter were dead, narrative was dead in poetry. Poetry would become ever more complex, which meant that it could only appeal to an elite audience, and finally, that the African American voice in poetry rejected these European things and would take this experimental form. What the intellectuals in the United States did was we took poetry away from common people. We took rhyme away, we took narrative away, we took the ballad away, and the common people reinvented it. The greatest one of these was Kool Herc in the South Bronx, who invented what we now think of as rap and hip hop. Within about ten years, it went from non-existent to being the most widely purchased form of popular music. We saw in our own lifetime something akin to Homer, the reinvention of popular oral poetry. There were parallels in the revival of slam poetry, cowboy poetry, and new formalism, so at every little social group, people from the ground up reinvented poetry because the intellectuals had taken it away from them."

In what William Baer has seen as the beginning of New Formalism, Rachel Hadas published her first chapbook in 1975, Charles Martin published his first collection in 1978, and Timothy Steele's first book of poems appeared in 1979.

Frederick Feirstein and Frederick Turner, on the other hand, first became aware that New Formalism existed during a 1981 conversation with Dick Allen at the "Minetta Tavern" in Greenwich Village. Turner had just published the provocative essay "Mighty Poets in Their Misery Dead: A Polemic on the Contemporary Poetry Scene" in Missouri Review and had immediately heard from many fellow Formalist poets. Meanwhile, Feirstein was already corresponding with West Coast Formalist poets, including Charles Martin and Dana Gioia. Turner and Feirstein later recalled, "We began to see ourselves as a distinct movement of many people. We saw each other's work begin to appear consistently in the literary journals."

Other literary scholars, including Robert McPhillips and Gerry Cambridge, date the beginning of New Formalism from the publication of Diane Wakoski's 1986 polemic essay "The New Conservatism in American Poetry" and the irate defenses that same essay provoked from Robert Mezey, Lewis Turco, David Radavich, Brian Richards, and Dana Gioia.

== Early history ==
One of the first rumbles of the conflict that was to provide the impetus to create New Formalism as a specific movement, came with the publication in 1977 of an issue of the Mississippi Review called 'Freedom and Form: American Poets Respond'. The late 1970s saw the publication of a few collections by poets working in traditional forms, including Comforting the Wilderness (1977) by Robert B. Shaw, Room for Error (1978) by Charles Martin, and Timothy Steele's Uncertainties and Rest (1979). In 1980 Mark Jarman and Robert McDowell started the small magazine The Reaper to promote narrative and formal poetry. In 1981 Jane Greer launched Plains Poetry Journal, which published new work in traditional forms. In 1984 McDowell started Story Line Press which has since published some New Formalist poets. The Reaper ran for ten years. Frederick Feirstein's Expansive Poetry (1989) gathered various essays on the New Formalism and the related movement New Narrative, under the umbrella term 'Expansive Poetry'.

From 1983 the onset of "neoformalism" was noted in the annual poetry roundups in the yearbooks of The Dictionary of Literary Biography, and through the mid-1980s heated debates on the topic of formalism were carried on in several journals. 1986 saw the publication of Vikram Seth's The Golden Gate: A Novel in Verse and the anthology Strong Measures: Contemporary American Poetry in Traditional Forms.

== The Poetry Wars ==
As the pioneers of the movement were joined in print by a growing number other young formalist poets, the dispute that had begun in the 1920s and 1950s reignited and would later be dubbed the Poetry Wars by literary critics and historians. This time, however, Free Verse poets, many of whom were English professors and veterans of the 1960s Counterculture, found themselves in the ironic position of being The Establishment.

The term 'New Formalism' was first used by Ariel Dawson in the article "The Yuppie Poet" in the May 1985 issue of the AWP Newsletter, which was a polemic against returning to traditional poetic forms. Dawson's article accused the New Formalist poets not only of social conservatism, but also of yuppie capitalism, consumerism, and greed; an allegation that would be repeated many times in the future.

Meanwhile, Frederick Turner and psychologist and neuroscientist Ernst Pöppel of the Max Planck Institute in Munich, West Germany, made a scientific breakthrough by proving "that regular rhythm actually induces the brain to release pleasure-creating endorphins" and, in 1985, they published their findings in the award-winning essay The Neural Lyre: Poetic Meter, the Brain, and Time in the magazine Poetry.

In 1986, Diane Wakoski, a deep image poet, literary critic, and professor at Michigan State University, published the essay The New Conservatism in American Poetry. The essay was provoked when Wakoski attended a Modern Language Association conference in which old Formalist John Hollander spoke critically, according to Robert McPhillips, of college and university "creative writing programs and the general slackness of most free verse."

In a critique which Robert McPhillips has called "less aesthetic than it is political", Wakoski recalled about Hollander's remarks, "I thought that I heard the Devil speaking to me." Hollander was, Wakoski alleged, "a man full of spite, from lack of recognition and thinly disguised anger... who was frustrated and petty from that frustration," as he was "denouncing the free verse revolution, denouncing the poetry which is the fulfillment of the Whitman heritage, making defensive jokes about the ill-educated, slovenly writers of poetry who have been teaching college poetry classes for the past decade, allowing their students to write drivel and go out into the world, illiterate of poetry." Wakoski then turned her attack against the younger poets, whom she called "really the spokesmen for the new conservatism," which she called an unfortunate continuation of the legacies of Henry Wadsworth Longfellow, T.S. Eliot, and Robert Frost.

According to Gerry Cambridge, "This attack generated five responses, from Robert Mezey, Lewis Turco, David Radavich, Brian Richards, and Dana Gioia. Most of them denied any necessary link between aesthetic and politics, in particular between form and conservatism, citing Ezra Pound as an example of a Fascist who wrote free verse. They also criticized as a kind of cultural fascism Wakoski's intolerance of literary pluralism, paradoxically in the guise of a democratic Whitmanism that declared form to be un-American. Gioia compared her tone and content to 'the quest for pure Germanic culture led by the late Joseph Goebbels.' He entertainingly suggested 'the radical notion' that whatever poetry was written by Americans constituted American poetry. Wakoski's polemic and these responses were the first public controversy about the young movement."

Despite more recent arguments against political stereotyping by Progressive New Formalist poets, such as Paul Lake in the 1988 essay, Towards a Liberal Poetics and by A.E. Stallings in the 2010 essay Afro-Formalism, as Dana Gioia wrote in 1987, "for many writers the discussion between formal and free-verse has become an encoded political debate."

Therefore, the Poetry Wars continued and poets who wrote free verse and Confessional poetry were alleged to be social progressives, anti-racists, and as New Left socialists. New Formalist and New Narrative poets, on the other hand, were stereotyped as old money White Anglo-Saxon Protestant preppies and as Anglophiles filled with hatred of the American Revolution and nostalgia for the British Empire. American poetry in traditional verse forms was, according to polemicists defending "The Free Verse Revolution", reactionary, Eurocentric, un-American, white supremacist, and even fascist.

For female New Formalists, The Poetry Wars meant accusations of betraying their gender and the cause of feminism; as Annie Finch wrote in 1994 in the Introduction to A Formal Feeling Comes: Poems in Form by Contemporary Women, "Readers who have been following the discussion of the 'New Formalism' over the last decade may not expect to find such a diversity of writers and themes in a book of formal poems; the poems collected here contradict the popular assumption that formal poetics correspond to reactionary politics and elitist aesthetics. The passion for form unites these many and diverse poets."

Similar accusations were unleashed against minority New Formalists and, in an essay of her own, Dominican-American poet and novelist Julia Alvarez defended her decision to write in languages and verse forms introduced to the New World by English and Spanish colonialists, while simultaneously subverting them by using those languages and verse forms to "say what's important to me as a woman and as a Latina."

== Later history ==
In 1990 William Baer started The Formalist and the first issue contained poems by, among others, Howard Nemerov, Richard Wilbur, and Donald Justice. The magazine ran twice a year for fifteen years, with the fall/winter 2004 issue being the last. The Formalist was succeeded by Measure: A Review of Formal Poetry, which is published biannually by the University of Evansville.

Since 1995, West Chester University has held an annual poetry conference with a special focus on formal poetry and New Formalism. Despite his original reluctance, the involvement of Richard Wilbur as the keynote speaker at the first conference in 1995 was a major reason for both its success and subsequent continuation. Richard Wilbur also continued to attend the Conference and teach classes there on the poets craft until well into his nineties. Every year the Robert Fitzgerald Prosody Award is awarded as part of the West Chester Poetry Conference.

Dominican-American poet Rhina Espaillat, who attended the first West Chester Poetry Conference as a student, has used her subsequent position as a teacher at the Conference to introduce her students to verse forms from Spanish and Latin American poetry, including the décima and the ovillejo. This has led to those verse forms being introduced into English-language poetry by Espaillat's students.

Dick Davis, a Persophile, University-trained Iranologist, and award-winning translator of Persian poetry, and Agha Shahid Ali, a Qizilbash Kashmiri Shiite Muslim and composer of Ghazals in American English, are also considered to be New Formalists.

Within New Formalism there are also several living authors of Christian poetry. They include Dana Gioia, Frederick Turner, David Middleton, and James Matthew Wilson.

Modern Christian poetry may be found in anthologies and in several Christian magazines such as Commonweal, Christian Century and Sojourners. Poetry by a new generation of Catholic poets appears in St. Austin Review, Dappled Things, The Lamp, and First Things.

== Legacy ==
During the early 21st century, poems in traditional forms were once again being published more widely, and the new formalist movement was winding down.

In 2001 the American poet Leo Yankevich founded The New Formalist, which published among others the poets Jared Carter and Keith Holyoak.

Meanwhile, the movement was still not without its detractors. In the November/December 2003 issue of P. N. Review, N. S. Thompson wrote: "While movements do need a certain amount of bombast to fuel interest, they have to be backed up by a certain artistic success. In hindsight, the movement seems to be less of a poetic revolution and more a marketing campaign."

Since then, the effects of new formalism have been observed in the broader domain of general poetry; a survey of successive editions of various general anthologies showed an increase in the number of villanelles included in the post-mid-'80s editions. The publication of books concerned with poetic form has also increased. Lewis Turco's Book of Forms from 1968 was revised and reissued in 1986 under the title 'New Book of Forms. Alfred Corn's The Poem's Heartbeat, Mary Oliver's Rules of the Dance, and Stephen Fry's The Ode Less Travelled are other examples of this trend. The widely used anthology An Exaltation of Forms: Contemporary Poets Celebrate the Diversity of Their Art (University of Michigan Press, 2002), edited by Annie Finch and Kathrine Varnes, defines formalist poetry as a form on a par with experimental, free verse, and even prose poetry.

In a 2010 essay, Philhellene poet A.E. Stallings, whose poetry has been favorably compared with that of both Richard Wilbur and Edna St. Vincent Millay, expressed regret that the writing of formal verse in American poetry remained "an oddly politicized choice". Stallings added that female and minority New Formalists continued to be "criticized" as part of what she dubbed "that false dichotomy of free verse = democracy and empowerment and progress whereas formal verse = oppression and elitism and kowtowing to dead white males."

Later in that same essay, however, Stallings described listening to African-American poet Erica Dawson, "who has something like rock star status in the formal world", as Dawson described how "A decade ago she was told at a recitation contest that 'form was dead' but now she has served as judge at that same contest. She exuded confidence and vindication, taking on the canon in her own terms."

In a 2022 interview with St. Austin Review co-editor Joseph Pearce, Polish journalist Anna Szyda from the literary magazine Magna Polonia explained that the nihilism of modern American poetry is widely noticed and commented upon in the Third Polish Republic as reflecting "the deleterious influence of the contemporary civilisation on the American soul." In response, StAR co-editor Joseph Pearce described "the neo-formalist revival" inspired by the late Richard Wilbur and how it has been reflected in recent verse by the Catholic poets whom he and Robert Asch publish in StAR. Pearce said that the Catholic faith and optimism of the younger generation of Catholic poets made him feel hope for the future.

In a 2016 interview with John Cusatis, Dana Gioia explained, "Literary movements are always temporary. They last a decade or so, and then they die or merge into the mainstream. The best New Formalist poets gradually became mainstream figures. There was no climax to the so-called Poetry Wars, only slow assimilation and change. Free and formal verse gradually ceased to be considered polar opposites. Form became one of the available styles of contemporary practice. Today one finds poems in rhyme and meter in most literary magazines. New Formalism became so successful that it no longer needed to exist."

== New Formalist canon ==
The 2004 West Chester Conference had a by-invitation-only critical seminar on 'Defining the Canon of New Formalism', in which the following anthologies were discussed:

- Rebel Angels: 25 Poets of the New Formalism edited by Mark Jarman and David Mason, 1996.
- The Direction of Poetry: An Anthology of Rhymed and Metered Verse Written in the English Language since 1975, edited by Robert Richman
- A Formal Feeling Comes: Poems in Form by Contemporary Women, edited by Annie Finch, 1993

== See also ==
- The New Formalist, a literary journal
- Eratosphere and Poetcraft Circles Community, online communities associated with formal poetry
- The Lyric, a journal devoted to formal poetry
- Mezzo Cammin, a journal devoted to formal poetry by women specifically
