= Stanisław Grochowiak =

Polish poet and dramatist

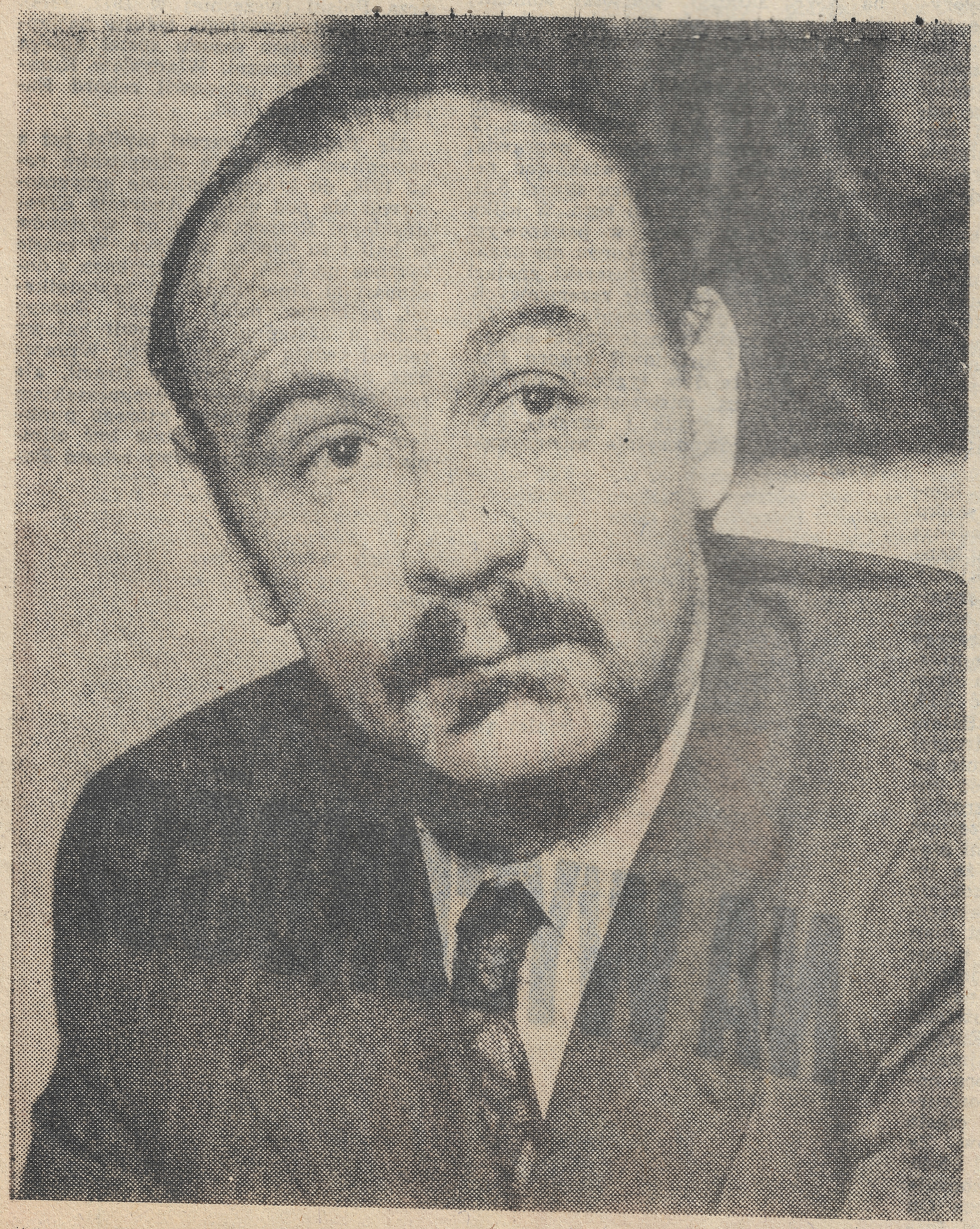
Stanisław Grochowiak

Stanisław Antoni Grochowiak, pen-name "Kain" (24 January 1934 – 2 September 1976) was a Polish poet and dramatist. His is often classified as a representative of turpism (Polish: turpizm), because of his interest in the physical, ugly and brutal, but he also exhibits strong tendencies toward formal, rhymed poetry, reaching on many occasions the ornamental grace of a baroque style. Grochowiak was born in Leszno and died, aged 42, in Warsaw.

Grochowiak is considered one of the leaders of the Polish "new wave" along with poets such as Zbigniew Herbert and Miron Białoszewski.

== See also ==
- Polish literature
