= The Formalist =

Magazine

- Categories: New formalist poetry
- Frequency: Semiannual
- Founded: 1990
- Final issue: 2004
- Country: United States
- Based in: Evansville, Indiana
- Language: English

The Formalist: A Journal of Metrical Poetry was a literary periodical, founded and edited by William Baer, which was published twice a year from 1990 to the fall/winter issue of 2004. The headquarters of the magazine was in Evansville, Indiana.

The Formalist published contemporary, metrical verse. Poets whose work has appeared in the journal include: Howard Nemerov, Richard Wilbur, Derek Walcott, Mona Van Duyn, Donald Justice, James Merrill, Maxine Kumin, Karl Shapiro, W. S. Merwin, May Swenson, W. D. Snodgrass, Louis Simpson, John Updike, Fred Chappell, and John Hollander.

From 1994 to 2005 The Formalist awarded the Howard Nemerov Sonnet Award.

== See also ==
- New Formalism
- Measure
