= Frederick Feirstein =

American poet, playwright, and psychoanalyst (1940–2020)

Frederick Feirstein (1940-2020) was a New Formalist and New Narrative poet, playwright and psychoanalyst. He published nine books of poetry, had twelve plays produced, and published numerous psychoanalytic and literary essays. His ninth book of poems, Dark Energy, was published in 2013 as the first book in the Grolier Series of Established Poets.

He was a training analyst at the National Psychological Association for Psychoanalysis and maintained a private practice.

Feirstein was a Guggenheim Fellow in poetry. He received the Rockefeller Foundation's OADR Award for his musical drama The Children's Revolt.
