= Erica Dawson (poet) =

American poet and professor

- Born: 1979 (age 46–47); Columbia, Maryland
- Education: Johns Hopkins University; Ohio State University; University of Cincinnati
- Occupation: Poet
- Website: ericadawsonpoet.net

Erica Dawson (born 1979) is an American poet and professor. She is the author of three poetry collections.

== Biography ==
Dawson grew up in Columbia, Maryland. After earning a B.A. degree at Johns Hopkins University and a Master of Fine Arts degree in Poetry at Ohio State University, she earned a PhD at the University of Cincinnati as the Elliston Fellow in Poetry.

Dawson's first poetry collection, Big-Eyed Afraid (Waywiser Press, 2007), was selected for the 2006 Anthony Hecht Poetry Prize by Mary Jo Salter and was named Best Debut of 2007 by the Contemporary Poetry Review. Her second collection, The Small Blades Hurt (Measure Press, 2014), won the 2016 Poets' Prize. A third collection, When Rap Spoke Straight to God, was published by Tin House Books in 2018. Dawson's poems have appeared in many literary journals and anthologies, including Barrow Street, Blackbird, and The Best American Poetry 2008, 2012, and 2015.

Dawson is known for her innovative use of traditional forms. In 2010 she was alleged by A.E. Stallings to have achieved "something like rock star status" among fellow New Formalist poets and poetry fans. She lives in Tampa, Florida, where she directs the University of Tampa's Low-Residency MFA in Creative Writing and serves as poetry editor of the Tampa Review.
