= Ryan Wilson (poet) =

American poet (born 1982)

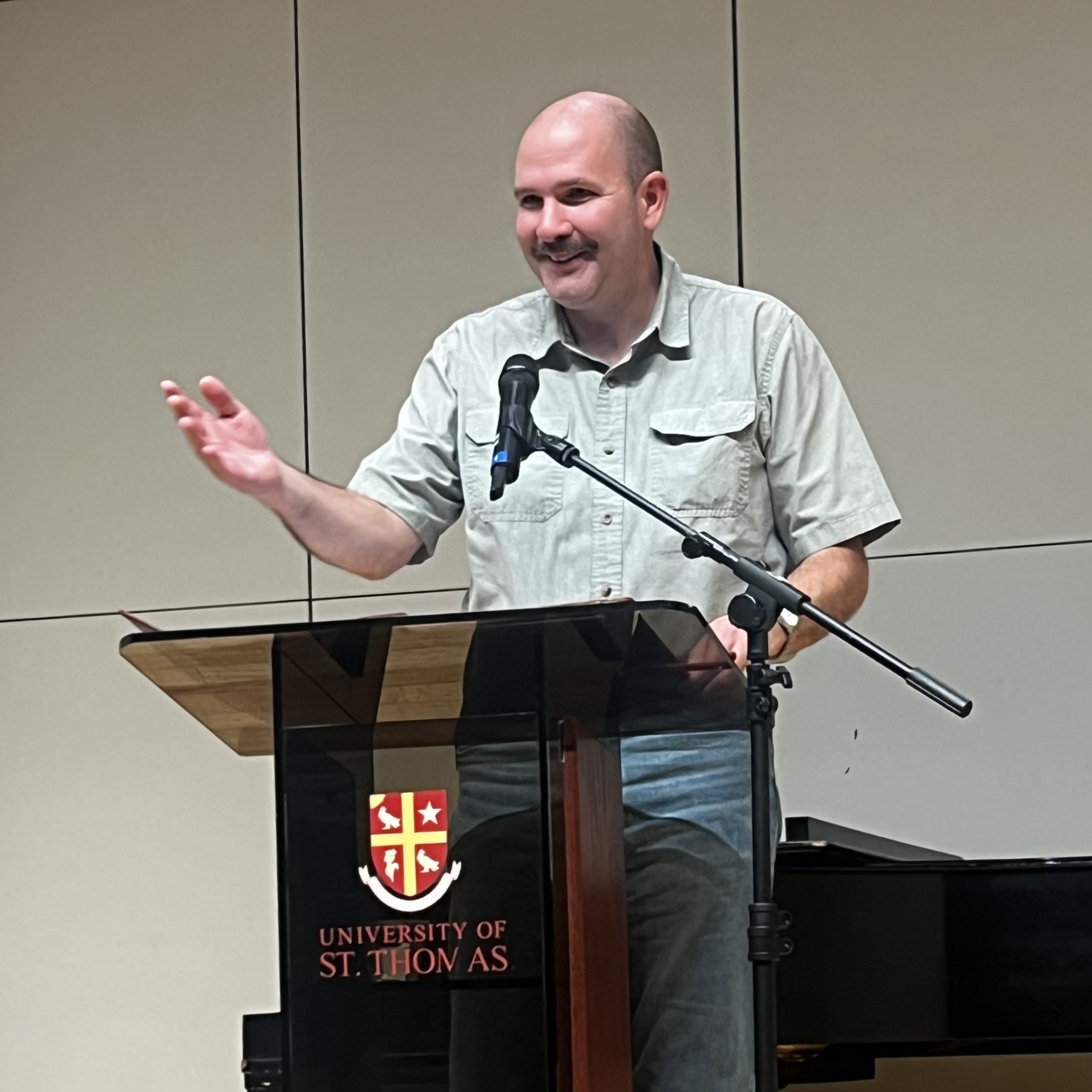
- Wilson in 2025
- Born: 1982 (age 43–44); Griffin, Georgia, U.S.
- Occupations: Academic; editor; literary critic; poet

Ryan James Wilson (born 1982) is an American poet, editor, translator, literary critic, and academic. He teaches at the Master of Fine Arts Program at the University of St. Thomas in Houston.

== Early life and education ==
Wilson grew up in Macon, Georgia. He earned a B.A. (English) from the University of Georgia, an M.F.A. (Poetry) from Johns Hopkins University, and an M.F.A. (Poetry) from Boston University in 2008.

== Career ==
He taught at The Catholic University of America, and he served as the Chief Financial Officer and Office Manager of the Association of Literary Scholars, Critics, and Writers, while also serving as editor-in-chief of Literary Matters, the association's digital literary journal.

He currently teaches at the Master of Fine Arts Program at the University of St. Thomas in Houston.

== Publications ==
- The Stranger World. Measure, 2017. Poetry.
- How to Think Like a Poet. Wiseblood, 2019. Monograph.
- Proteus Bound: Selected Translations, 2008-2020. Franciscan University Press, 2021.
- In Ghostlight. LSU, 2024. Poetry.
- Contemporary Catholic Poetry: An Anthology. Paraclete, 2024. Co-edited with April Lindner.
