= Zsuzsanna Ozsváth =

Hungarian-American author and translator (1931–2026)

- Born: Zsuzsanna Abonyi; 2 July 1931; Békéscsaba, Hungary
- Died: 6 February 2026 (aged 94)
- Occupations: Author; translator

Academic background
- Education: Hochschule für Musik und Theater Hamburg (BA) The University of Texas at Austin (PhD)
- Alma mater: University of Texas, Austin, Texas
- Thesis: Die Dilaektik der Freiheit bei Friedrich Schiller und bei Tomas Mann (1968)

Zsuzsanna Ozsváth (2 July 1931 – 6 February 2026) was a Hungarian-American author and translator of Jewish descent. After moving to the United States, she documented her experience as a holocaust survivor and translated several works of poetry and literature, mainly those of Hungarian and German authors. In 2003 she was named the Leah and Paul Lewis Chair of Holocaust Studies at the University of Texas, Dallas.

== Education ==
A classical pianist, Ozsváth was awarded a concert diploma from the State Academy of Music at Hamburg in 1961. She went on to earn her Ph.D. in German Language and Literature from The University of Texas at Austin in 1968.

== Career ==
Ozsváth joined the University of Texas at Dallas as a lecturer in 1976, initially teaching 19th- and 20th-century literature and history classes. Shortly thereafter, she began teaching courses about the Holocaust.

She spearheaded the founding of the Holocaust Studies Program at the University of Texas at Dallas in 1986. In 2003, she was appointed to the Leah and Paul Lewis Chair of Holocaust Studies. Ozsváth retired in 2020.

== Selected publications ==
- Foamy Sky: The Major Poems of Miklós Radnóti (1992)
- The Iron–Blue Vault: Attila József, Selected Poems (1999)
- In the Footsteps of Orpheus: The Life and Times of Miklós Radnóti (2000)
- When the Danube Ran Red (2010)
- My Journey Home: Life After the Holocaust (2019)
- The Golden Goblet: Selected Poems of Goethe (2019)
- Faust, Part One (2021)
- Light within the Shade: Eight–Hundred–Years of Hungarian Poetry (2022)

== Honors and award ==
Ozsváth received a Fulbright Award (1990-1991). She was a co-recipient of the Milán Füst Prize for her translation of Miklós Radnóti's poems.

== Personal life and death ==
In 1950, she married Dr. Istvan “Pista” Ozsváth (1928-2013). In 1957 they immigrated to Hamburg, Germany and later in 1962 they moved to the United States, where he had been offered a position as a mathematics professor at The University of Texas in Austin.

Ozsváth died on 6 February 2026, at the age of 94.
