= Headmistress Press =

American publishing company

Headmistress Press, est. 2013

Headmistress Press is a small press based in Sequim, Washington. Founded in 2013, the press specializes in poetry by lesbian poets. Notable poets who have published collections with Headmistress include Janice Gould, Joy Ladin, Constance Merritt, and Lesléa Newman.

== History ==
Headmistress Press was started in 2013 by founding editor Mary Meriam, founding editor Risa Denenberg, and Jessica Lowell Mason (formerly Jessica Mason McFadden), who gave the press its name. In 2015, Rita Mae Reese joined Meriam and Denenberg as "Mistress of Marketing." The advisory board includes Ellen Bass, R. Nemo Hill, JP Howard, Joy Ladin, and Hannah Barrett.

Several of its publications have won awards: The Body's Alphabet by Ann Tweedy (2016) won a Bisexual Book Award for Poetry, and was a finalist for a Lambda Literary Award for Bisexual Nonfiction and for the Golden Crown Literary Society Award for Poetry. I Carry My Mother by Lesléa Newman was named a 2016 "Must Read" title by the Massachusetts Center for the Book and received the 2016 Golden Crown Literary Society Poetry Award. Conjuring My Leafy Muse by Mary Meriam was nominated for the 2015 Poets' Prize, and Girlie Calendar by Mary Meriam was selected for the American Library Association's Over the Rainbow List in 2016.

In 2015, Headmistress published Lady of the Moon, edited by Mary Meriam, with a selection of poems by Amy Lowell, and lesbian-feminist scholar Lillian Faderman's groundbreaking essay on Amy Lowell. The press also published a general-audience anthology, Irresistible Sonnets, featuring sonnets by contemporary poets such as Robin Becker, Judy Grahn, Marilyn Hacker, Geoffrey Hill, Joshua Mehigan, Marilyn Nelson, Catherine Tufariello, and many others; it was selected for the Best Books List for June 2014 by Grace Cavalieri of the Washington Independent Review of Books.

Headmistress debuted its Lesbian Poet Trading Cards in 2015. The trading card project, lauded by Kathleen Rooney in the Chicago Tribune and featured on Harriet, AfterEllen, and Nat. Brut, is the press's way of "honoring lesbian existence, recognizing a range of lesbian voices, and promoting lesbian representation in the arts." They feature such poets as Naomi Replansky, Amy Lowell, Charlotte Mew, Eloise Klein Healy, Judy Grahn, Audre Lorde, and Minnie Bruce Pratt, among others.
