= Rita Mae Reese =

American poet

Rita Mae Reese is an American poet, fiction writer, and marketing director at Headmistress Press, an independent publisher of chapbooks and full-length collections by lesbian poets.

== Life ==
Reese was born and raised in Charleston, West Virginia, and lives in Madison, Wisconsin. She earned a B.A. in American studies and an M.A. in creative writing at Florida State University, and an M.F.A. at the University of Wisconsin-Madison. Her first collection, The Alphabet Conspiracy (Red Hen Press), won the 2012 Drake Emerging Writers Award. Other awards include the Rona Jaffe Foundation Writers' Award for fiction in 2006, a Wallace Stegner Fellowship from Stanford University, the Paumanok Poetry Award, and a Discovery/The Nation award. Her latest book, The Book of Hulga, won the Felix Pollak Prize and will be published in 2016. Her work has been published in many journals and anthologies, including Poetry From Sojourner: A Feminist Anthology (2004) and Robert Olen Butler's From Where You Dream: The Process of Writing Fiction (2005).

Headmistress Press was founded in 2013 by Mary Meriam (poet, Ms. magazine columnist, and founding editor of the Lavender Review) and poet Risa Denenberg. Reese joined the staff as "Headmistress of Marketing" in 2015. She is the designer of the press's Lesbian Poet trading cards. The trading card project, lauded by Kathleen Rooney in the Chicago Tribune and featured on Harriet, AfterEllen, and Nat. Brut, is the press's way of "honoring lesbian existence, recognizing a range of lesbian voices, and promoting lesbian representation in the arts." They feature such poets as Naomi Replansky, Lesléa Newman, Amy Lowell, Janice Gould, Charlotte Mew, Eloise Klein Healy, Judy Grahn, Audre Lorde, and Minnie Bruce Pratt, among others.
