= Mary Meriam =

American poet and editor (born 1955)

- Born: 1955 (age 70–71); Passaic, New Jersey, U.S.
- Education: Bennington College; Columbia University
- Occupation: Freelance writer/editor
- Writing career
- Genre: Poetry
- Literary movement: New Formalism
- Website: marymeriam.blogspot.com

Mary Meriam (born 1955) is an American poet and editor. She is a founding editor of Headmistress Press, one of the few presses (possibly the only press) in the United States specializing in lesbian poetry.

== Biography ==
Mary Meriam was born in Passaic, New Jersey. She earned a B.A. in Poetry from Bennington College and an M.F.A. in Poetry from Columbia University. She has published four full-length collections of poetry and four chapbooks. Three of her books (Word Hot, Conjuring My Leafy Muse, and Girlie Calendar) make up the Lillian Trilogy, which is dedicated to her mentor, Lillian Faderman.

Her first full-length collection, Conjuring My Leafy Muse (2015), was warmly praised by Naomi Replansky, David Bergman, Willis Barnstone, and others; it was nominated for the 2015 Poets' Prize. Girlie Calendar (2016) has been similarly well received. A new collection, My Girl's Green Jacket (2018), was favorably reviewed by several advance readers, including Rhina Espaillat, Rachel Hadas, and Stu Watson.

Meriam founded Lavender Review, an e-zine of lesbian poetry and art, on Gay Pride Day, June 27, 2010. In 2013, she founded Headmistress Press, a lesbian poetry press, with Risa Denenberg.

Her poetry, reviews, and essays have been published widely in literary journals, including Poetry, The Cimarron Review, The Evansville Review, The Gay & Lesbian Review, The Journal of Lesbian Studies, Literary Imagination, Measure, Mezzo Cammin, Rattle, Sinister Wisdom, and The Women's Review of Books; in anthologies, such as Nasty Women Poets: An Unapologetic Anthology of Subversive Verse, Measure for Measure: An Anthology of Poetic Meters, and Obsession: Sestinas in the 21st Century; and on websites such as the Poetry Foundation, Ms. magazine, and The New York Times.

Meriam often uses traditional forms in her poetry. She invented an original form called "Basic Me" which has been used by other poets, including Catherine Tufariello and Marly Youmans.

== Books ==
=== Full-length poetry collections ===
- Pools of June, Exot Books, 2022
- My Girl's Green Jacket, Headmistress Press, 2018
- Girlie Calendar, Headmistress Press, 2014
- Conjuring My Leafy Muse, Headmistress Press, 2013

=== Chapbooks ===
- The Lesbian, Seven Kitchens Press, 2016
- Word Hot, Headmistress Press, 2013
- The Poet's Zodiac, Seven Kitchens Press, 2011
- The Countess of Flatbroke, Modern Metrics, 2006

== Honors and awards ==
- 2017: "The Earth" nominated for a Pushcart Prize by SWWIM
- 2016: Girlie Calendar selected for the American Library Association's Over the Rainbow List
- 2016: Winner of the San Diego Reader Sonnet Contest
- 2015: Conjuring My Leafy Muse nominated for the 2015 Poets' Prize
- 2014: Irresistible Sonnets selected for the Washington Independent Review of Books Best Books List for June 2014
