= Paul Lake (disambiguation) =

Paul Lake (born 1968) is an English former footballer.

Paul Lake may also refer to:

- Paul Lake (cyclist) (born 1970), Australian Paralympic cyclist
- Paul Lake (poet), American poet, essayist and professor at Arkansas Tech University
- Paul Lake (Nova Scotia), Canada
- Paul Lake Provincial Park, British Columbia, Canada
