= Patricia Lieb =

American author and poet (1942–2025)

Patricia Shipp Lieb
- Born: April 7, 1942; Texarkana, Arkansas, U.S.
- Died: September 5, 2025 (aged 83)
- Education: Governors State University
- Occupations: Journalist, author

Patricia Shipp Lieb (April 7, 1942 – September 5, 2025) was an American poet, newspaper journalist and book author who wrote poetry, fiction and non-fiction and specialized in the crime-novel genre. She later lived in the U.S. state of Florida.

Early in her journalism career, she was honored for her "Reliable Reporting of Local Government News 1991-1999" by the Dunedin City Commission and for "Outstanding Dedication to Reliable and Impartial News Coverage" in 1996; in 1998 she was honored with the "Outstanding Achievement in Your Vocation" by the Rotary Club of Dunedin.

== Life and career ==
=== Early life and education ===
Patricia Shipp Lieb was born in Texarkana, Arkansas on April 7, 1942. Upon completion of her high school studies, she entered Kankakee Community College in Kankakee, Illinois. She later transferred to Governors State University in University Park, Illinois.

=== Writing career ===
Lieb worked for the Daily Journal in Kankakee, as a feature writer. She co-founded Lieb-Schott Publications with Carol Schott (Martino); they edited and published a literary magazine, Pteranodon, which featured poets such as William Stafford, Richard Eberhart, Jared Carter, Glenn Swetman, David Chorlton, and writers such as Patrick Smith and Borden Deal. They published books of poetry by other poets as well as compilations of their own works.

After moving to Florida, Lieb joined the news crew at the Daily Sun-Journal in Brooksville where she worked for four years as the newspaper's crime-beat reporter. She also wrote for true crime magazines for the next 10 years and later wrote Murders in the Swampland, the story of an actual murder.

Lieb last worked as a news and feature writer for the Suncoast News in New Port Richey where she won several awards from the Florida State Press Association, Kiwanis and Rotary Clubs, awards from the City of Dunedin, and various awards for features and photography.

=== Personal life and death ===
Lieb had two children; Douglas Lieb Jr., who lives in Middleboro, Massachusetts; and Rachelle Lieb Strenge, who lives in Spring Hill, Florida. Her step-parents are deceased.

Lieb died on September 5, 2025, at the age of 83.

== Bibliography ==
- Transparent Jeans: Poems. (A Pteranodon chapbook) Lieb-Schott Publications, 1980.
- Catholics and Publics. (poems, with foreword by poet Jared Carter)1983. ISBN 99942-3-696-2
- Captured. (A Pteranodon chapbook of poems) Lieb-Schott Publications, 1983.
- The Goat Ate My Notes: 2002 Bramble Street, Vol.1, 1st ed., CreateSpace Independent Publishing Platform, 2015. ISBN 1-5151-4628-6
- Across the Red River to Her Mysterious Heritage. ZXlibris Corp, 2003. ISBN 1-4010-8322-6
- Confessions of a High-Priced Call Girl. (co-author) 1st ed., BookSurge Publishing, 2006. ISBN 1-4196-2421-0
- Blue Eyes. Asylett Press, 2007. ISBN 1-9343-3732-3
- Murders in the Swampland. Asylett Press, 2008. ISBN 1-9343-3747-1
- Bridged By Love. Asylett Press, 2009. ISBN 1-9343-3741-2
- Sex, Games & Death. Kindle Edition, 2012 ASIN B008I79LAC
- Saying I Love You. Asylett Press, 2012. ISBN 1-9343-3736-6
- How I Met My Husband, by Michele Stegman. (contributing author; Lumps in the mattress) eBook and Kindle Edition, 2012. ASIN B008RE1RJO
- Kid Killers. (Florida Killers) Kindle Edition, 2012. ASIN B008RXW27Q
- Florida Serial Killers. Kindle Edition, 2012. ASIN B0085XMI1S
- Innocent Until Proven Guilty. Kindle Edition, 2013. ASIN B00DII18JS
- The Adventures of a Squirrel Named Peanut. CreateSpace Independent Publishing Platform, 2013. ISBN 1-4937-5140-9
- Blue Eyes Haunting. Kindle Edition, 2013. ASIN B008G0J80E
- My 18th Birthday. Kindle Edition, 2014. ASIN B00Q4ZGMSE
- Among My Souvenirs. CreateSpace Independent Publishing Platform, 2014. ISBN 1-4997-1678-8
- Sundown:Poems from the Deep: paranormal poems. Kindle Edition, 2015. ASIN B019YBJZH4
