= Porter Prize =

The Porter Prize, established in 1984 by the non-profit organization known as the Porter Fund Literary Prize, is awarded annually to a writer who has created a substantial body of work and has a significant connection with Arkansas. The $5000 prize is one of the most prestigious literary awards in Arkansas. (The non-profit organization also awards a lifetime achievement award every five years and an annual scholarship to a student in the University of Central Arkansas Master of Fine Arts Creative Writing Program.) The Porter Prize was founded in honor of Ben Drew Kimpel.

== Recipients ==
- 2023 Jay Jennings Fiction
- 2022 Mark Barr Fiction
- 2021 Jen Fawkes Fiction
- 2020 Geffrey Davis Poetry
- 2019 Qui Nguyen Playwriting
- 2018 Tyrone Jaeger Fiction
- 2017 Padma Viswanathan Fiction
- 2016 Sandy Longhorn Poetry
- 2015 Davis McCombs Poetry
- 2014 Mara Leveritt Non-Fiction
- 2013 Pat Carr Fiction
- 2012 Margaret Jones Bolsterli Non-Fiction
- 2011 Bill Harrison Fiction
- 2010 Bob Ford Playwriting
- 2009 Roy Reed Non-Fiction
- 2008 Trenton Lee Stewart Fiction
- 2007 Greg Brownderville Poetry
- 2006 Donald "Skip" Hays Fiction
- 2005 Shirley Abbott Non-Fiction
- 2005 Constance Merritt Poetry
- 2004 Michael Burns Poetry
- 2003 Kevin Brockmeier Fiction
- 2002 Ralph Burns Poetry
- 2001 Morris Arnold Non-Fiction
- 2001 Fleda Brown Poetry
- 2000 Jo McDougall Poetry
- 1999 Grif Stockley Fiction
- 1998 Michael Heffernan Poetry
- 1997 Dennis Vannatta Fiction
- 1996 David Jauss Fiction
- 1995 Norman Lavers Fiction
- 1994 Werner Trieschmann Playwriting
- 1993 No Prize was awarded
- 1992 Andrea Hollander Poetry
- 1991 Crescent Dragonwagon Fiction
- 1990 James Twiggs Fiction
- 1989 Hope Norman Coulter Fiction
- 1988 Paul Lake Poetry
- 1987 Donald Harington Fiction
- 1986 Buddy Nordan Fiction
- 1985 Leon Stokesbury Poetry
