= Mark Bolsterli =

American theoretical physicist

Mark Bolsterli (October 3, 1930, New Haven, Connecticut – May 19, 2012, Santa Fe, New Mexico) was an American theoretical physicist, specializing in nuclear physics.

== Biography ==
Mark Bolsterli attended high school in Webster Groves, Missouri. He was an Eagle Scout. He graduated in 1955 from Washington University in St. Louis with a Ph.D. in physics. His Ph.D. thesis A perturbation procedure for bound states of nuclei was supervised by Eugene Feenberg. Bolsterli received a Fulbright Scholarship to England for the academic year 1955–1956, a fellowship to the Niels Bohr Institute for the academic year 1961–62, and a Guggenheim Fellowship to the University of Oxford for the academic year 1964–65. At the University of Minnesota he was a professor from 1959 to 1969. He was a staff member of the Theoretical Physics Division of Los Alamos National Laboratory from 1969 to 1991, when he retired. He did research on the structure of atomic nuclei and mathematical physics. He was elected in 1963 a Fellow of the American Physical Society.

His first wife, Margaret Jones, whom he met in the early 1950s when they were both graduate students at Washington University in St. Louis, became a well-known author. They had two sons, Eric (born 1957), and David (1959–2019). During the 1960s, Mark and Margaret Bolsterli divorced. In 1971, he met Judith "Judy" Costlow (born 1946) when they were skiing in the Santa Fe Ski Basin. They married and over the years of their marriage they "skied, hiked, and bicycled in many parts of the world." Mark and Judy Costlow in 1976 bicycled from Missoula, Montana to Yellowstone National Park and then to Jackson Hole, Wyoming. In 2007 the couple went on a bicycle tour from Bariloche, Argentina to Puerto Montt, Chile.

Mark Bolsterli died in 2019, aged 81, from complications of Parkinson's disease. He was survived by his wife, two sons, and extended family.

== Selected publications ==
- Bolsterli, Mark; Feenberg, Eugene (1956). "Perturbation Procedure for Bound States of Nuclei". Physical Review. 101 (4): 1349–1357. Bibcode:1956PhRv..101.1349B. doi:10.1103/PhysRev.101.1349.
- Brown, G. E.; —— (1959). "Dipole State in Nuclei". Physical Review Letters. 3 (10): 472–476. Bibcode:1959PhRvL...3..472B. doi:10.1103/PhysRevLett.3.472. (over 400 citations)
- Kromminga, A. J.; —— (1962). "Perturbation Theory of Many-Boson Systems". Physical Review. 128 (6): 2887–2897. Bibcode:1962PhRv..128.2887K. doi:10.1103/PhysRev.128.2887.
- —— (1963). "Invariant Functions in Nonrelativistic Theory". Physical Review. 129 (6): 2830–2834. Bibcode:1963PhRv..129.2830B. doi:10.1103/PhysRev.129.2830.
- ——; Jezak, E. (1964). "Vector Harmonics for Three Identical Fermions". Physical Review. 135 (2B): B510–B515. Bibcode:1964PhRv..135..510B. doi:10.1103/PhysRev.135.B510.
- ——; MacKenzie, J. (1965). "Determination of separable potential from phase shift". Physics Physique Fizika. 2 (3): 141–149. doi:10.1103/PhysicsPhysiqueFizika.2.141.
- —— (1965). "Galilean invariance and Green functions for bound systems". Nuclear Physics. 66 (2): 369–375. Bibcode:1965NucPh..66..369B. doi:10.1016/0029-5582(65)90185-9.
- ——; Gibbs, W. R.; Kerman, A. K.; Young, J. E. (1966). "Intermediate-Structure Strength Function". Physical Review Letters. 17 (16): 878–880. Bibcode:1966PhRvL..17..878B. doi:10.1103/PhysRevLett.17.878.
- McVoy, K. W.; Heller, L.; —— (1967). "Optical Analysis of Potential Well Resonances". Reviews of Modern Physics. 39 (1): 245–258. Bibcode:1967RvMP...39..245M. doi:10.1103/RevModPhys.39.245.
- —— (1968). "Algebraic Solution in the V − θ Sector of the Lee Model". Physical Review. 166 (5): 1760–1767. doi:10.1103/PhysRev.166.1760.
- —— (1969). "Ground-State Energy of a One-Dimensional Many-Boson System". Physical Review. 178 (1): 432. Bibcode:1969PhRv..178..432B. doi:10.1103/PhysRev.178.432.
- —— (1969). "Continuity of Phase Shift at Continuum Bound State". Physical Review. 182 (4): 1095–1096. Bibcode:1969PhRv..182.1095B. doi:10.1103/PhysRev.182.1095.
- ——; Norton, J. L. (1971). "Separable Approximations to Matrices and Functions of Two Variables". Journal of Mathematical Physics. 12 (6): 969–970. Bibcode:1971JMP....12..969B. doi:10.1063/1.1665690. 1971
- —— (1971). "Self-consistent method for interactions mediated by fields". Annals of Physics. 62 (2): 569–581. Bibcode:1971AnPhy..62..569B. doi:10.1016/0003-4916(71)90103-5.
- ——; Fiset, E. O.; Nix, J. R.; Norton, J. L. (1971). "Shape of the Island of Superheavy Nuclei". Physical Review Letters. 27 (10): 681–685. Bibcode:1971PhRvL..27..681B. doi:10.1103/PhysRevLett.27.681.
- Visscher, William M.; —— (1972). "Random Packing of Equal and Unequal Spheres in Two and Three Dimensions". Nature. 239 (5374): 504–507. Bibcode:1972Natur.239..504V. doi:10.1038/239504a0. S2CID 4224961.
- ——; Hale, G. (1972). "Modified Phase-Shift Analysis for p-^{3}He Elastic Scattering". Physical Review Letters. 28 (19): 1285–1287. Bibcode:1972PhRvL..28.1285B. doi:10.1103/PhysRevLett.28.1285.
- Britt, H. C.; ——; Nix, J. R.; Norton, J. L. (1973). "Fission Barriers Deduced from the Analysis of Fission Isomer Results". Physical Review C. 7 (2): 801–823. Bibcode:1973PhRvC...7..801B. doi:10.1103/PhysRevC.7.801.
- —— (1976). "Translation invariance and localized states". Physical Review D. 13 (6): 1727–1732. Bibcode:1976PhRvD..13.1727B. doi:10.1103/PhysRevD.13.1727.
  - —— (1976). "Erratum: Translation invariance and localized states". Physical Review D. 14 (10): 2833. Bibcode:1976PhRvD..14.2833B. doi:10.1103/PhysRevD.14.2833.2.
- Liu, Keh-Fei, ed. (April 1987). "Chapter 13. The nucleon as a pionic soliton by M. Bolsterli and J. A. Parmentola". Chiral Solitons. Singapore: World Scientific. pp. 507–536. ISBN 9789814507806.
- —— (1991). "Canonical transformation method for static-source meson Hamiltonians". Journal of Mathematical Physics. 32 (1): 254–258. Bibcode:1991JMP....32..254B. doi:10.1063/1.529128.
