= Doren Robbins =

American poet

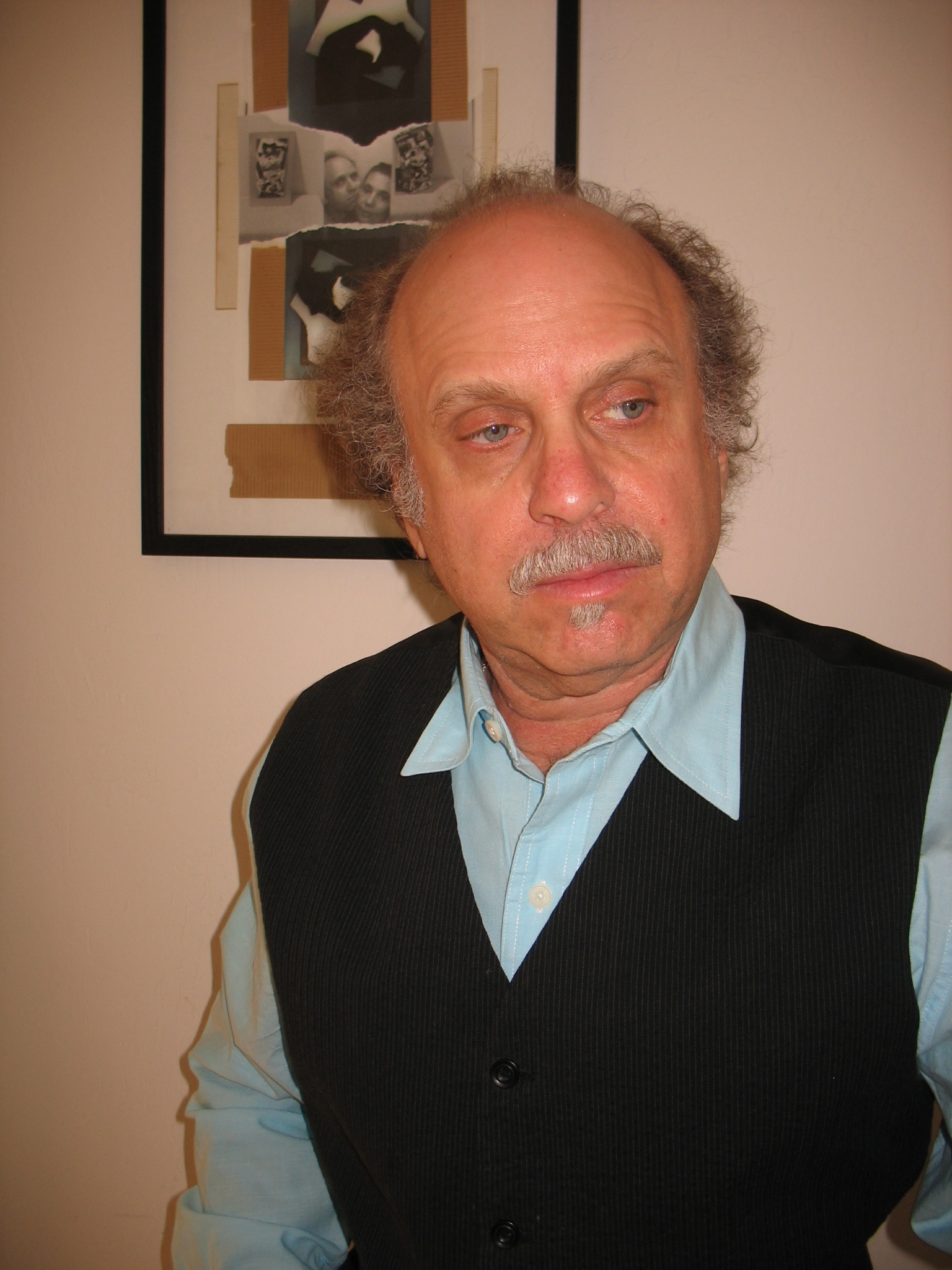
- Doren Robbins (photo by Linda Janakos)
- Born: August 20, 1949 (age 77); Los Angeles, California
- Writing career
- Genres: Poetry, Fiction, Essays
- Website: www.dorenrobbins.com

Doren Robbins (born August 20, 1949 in Los Angeles, California) is a contemporary American poet, prose poet, fiction writer, essayist, mixed media artist, and educator. As a cultural activist, he has organized and developed projects for Amnesty International, the Salvadoran Medical Relief Fund, the Romero Relief Fund, and poetsagainstthewar.org. Robbins has lived most of his life in California and Oregon.

== Writing and artistic life ==
Doren Robbins has published poetry, prose poetry, short fiction, literary criticism and book reviews in over one hundred journals, including The American Poetry Review, North Dakota Quarterly, Cimarron Review, Hawaii Review, Indiana Review, International Poetry, Kayak, Onthebus, Paterson Literary Review, Pemmican, Sulfur, New Letters, 5 AM, Willow Springs, and Hayden's Ferry Review. In spring 2008, Eastern Washington University Press published a new book of poems, My Piece of the Puzzle. His previous collection of poetry, Driving Face Down, won the Blue Lynx Prize for Poetry. In 2004, Cedar Hill Publications published Parking Lot Mood Swing: Autobiographical Monologues and Prose Poetry. A mixed media artist as well as a writer, two of his works are currently on exhibit at the Crossing Boundaries: Visual Art by Writers exhibit, held at the Paterson Museum in New Jersey. His collage-portrait of Kenneth Rexroth, "Angles with Fissures", appeared in the Beyond Baroque Literary Arts Center documentary film, Kenneth Rexroth Centennial.

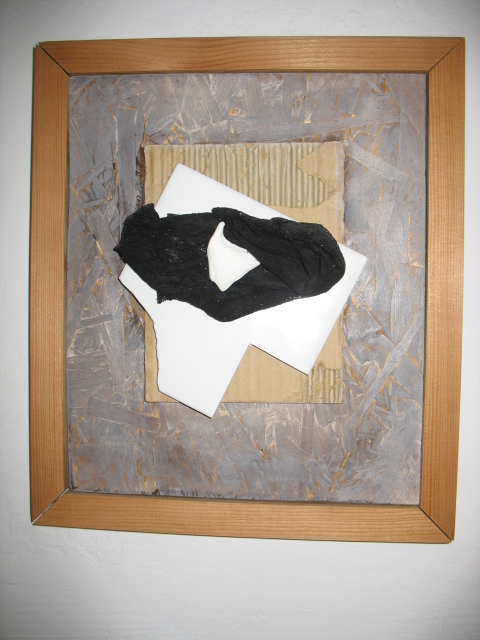
"Preferred Muse" created with shell, lace stocking, cardboard, strand board, white wash, and stain, 1999, by Doren Robbins

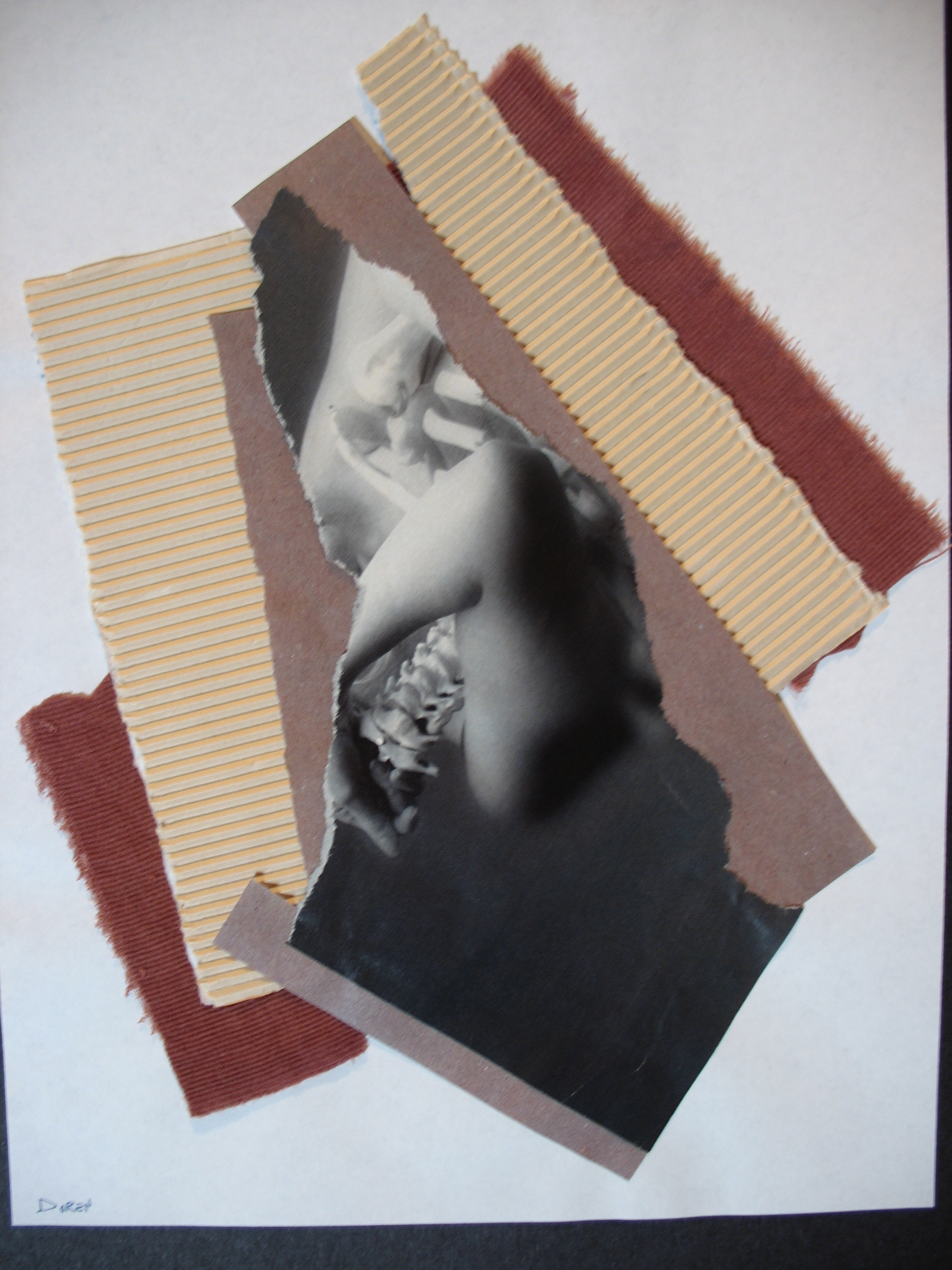
"Feminine #3" created with photograph, corduroy, and watercolor, 2000, by Doren Robbins

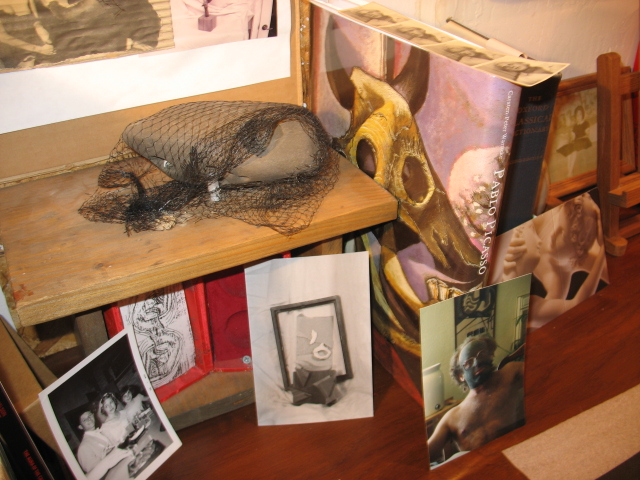
Desk arrangement with self-portrait and two portraits of Linda Janakos, by Doren Robbins

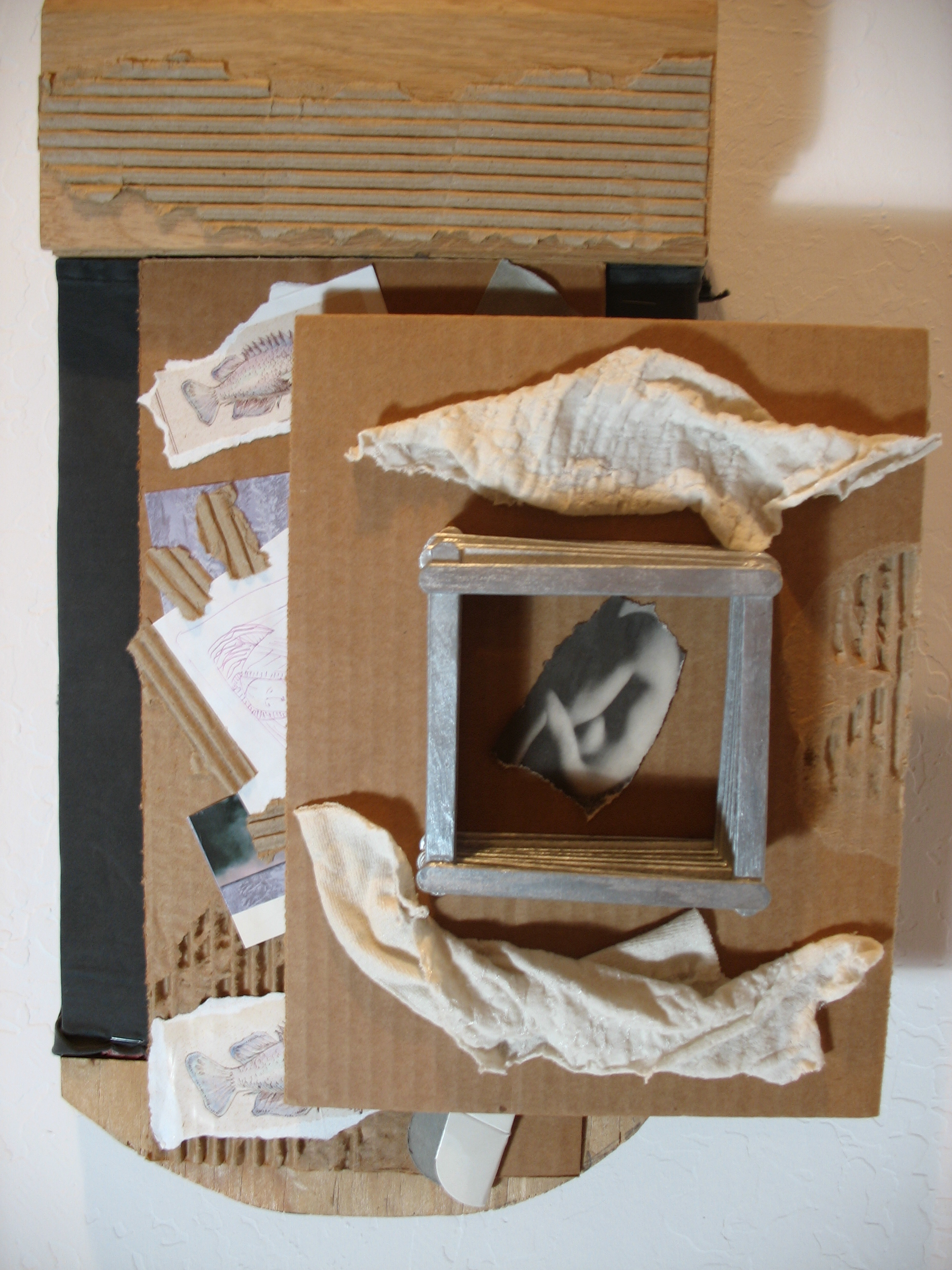
"Black and White Muse" by Doren Robbins

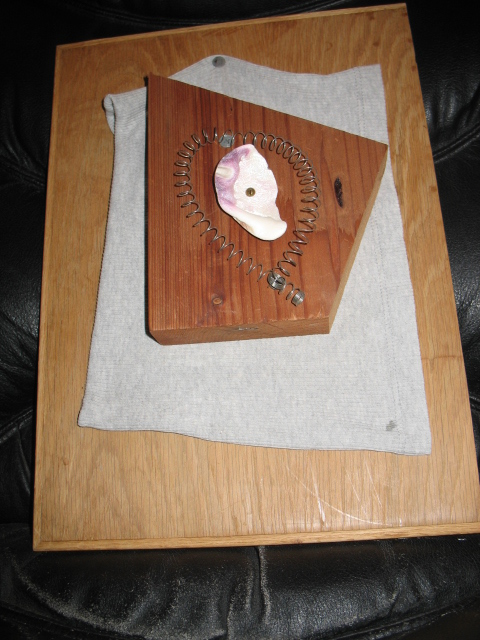
"Good Ear" created with wire, shell, cotton tank top, redwood, and oak ply, by Doren Robbins

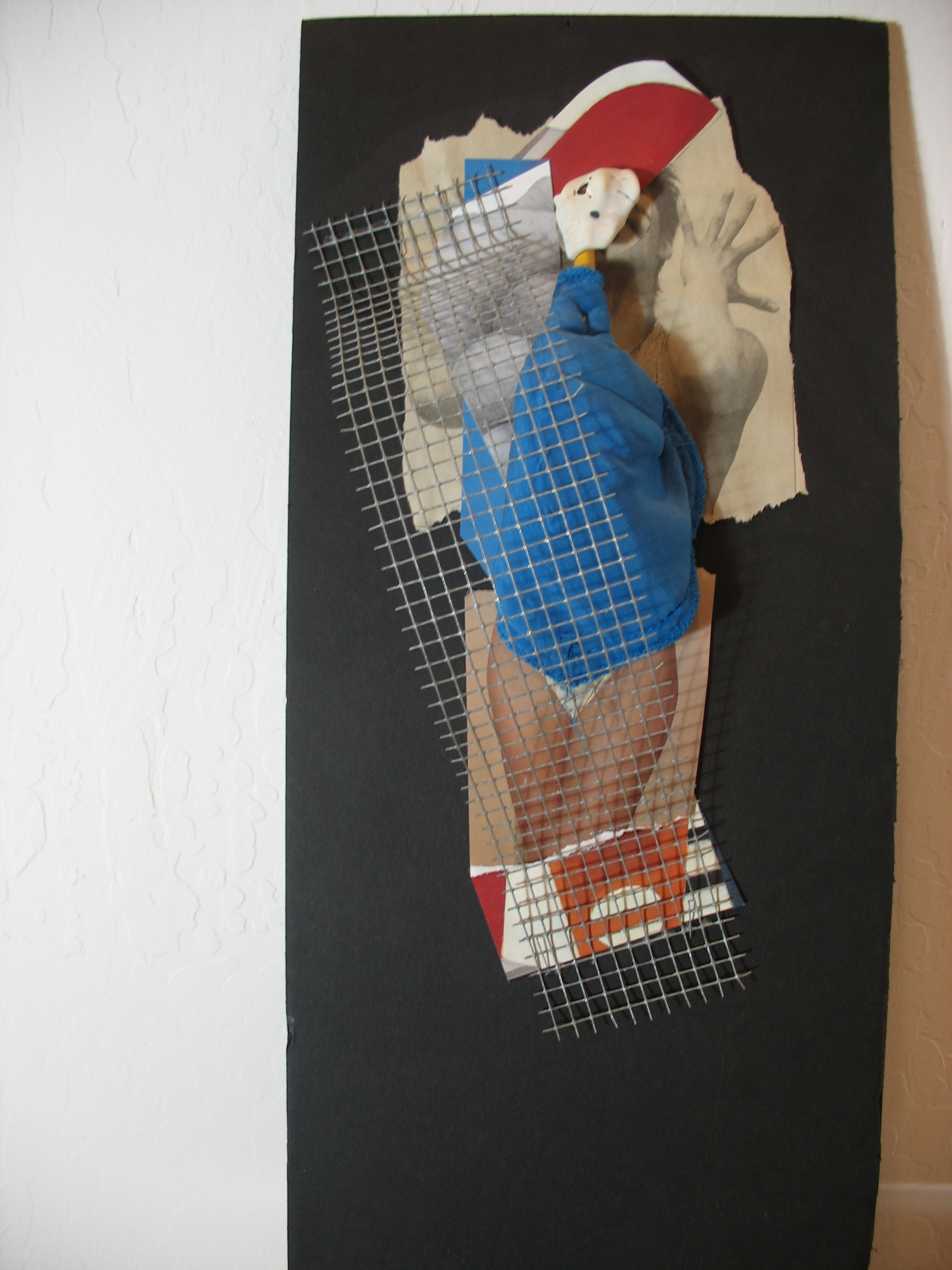
"Hostage Libido" created with lath wire, photos, silk cloth, and shell, by Doren Robbins

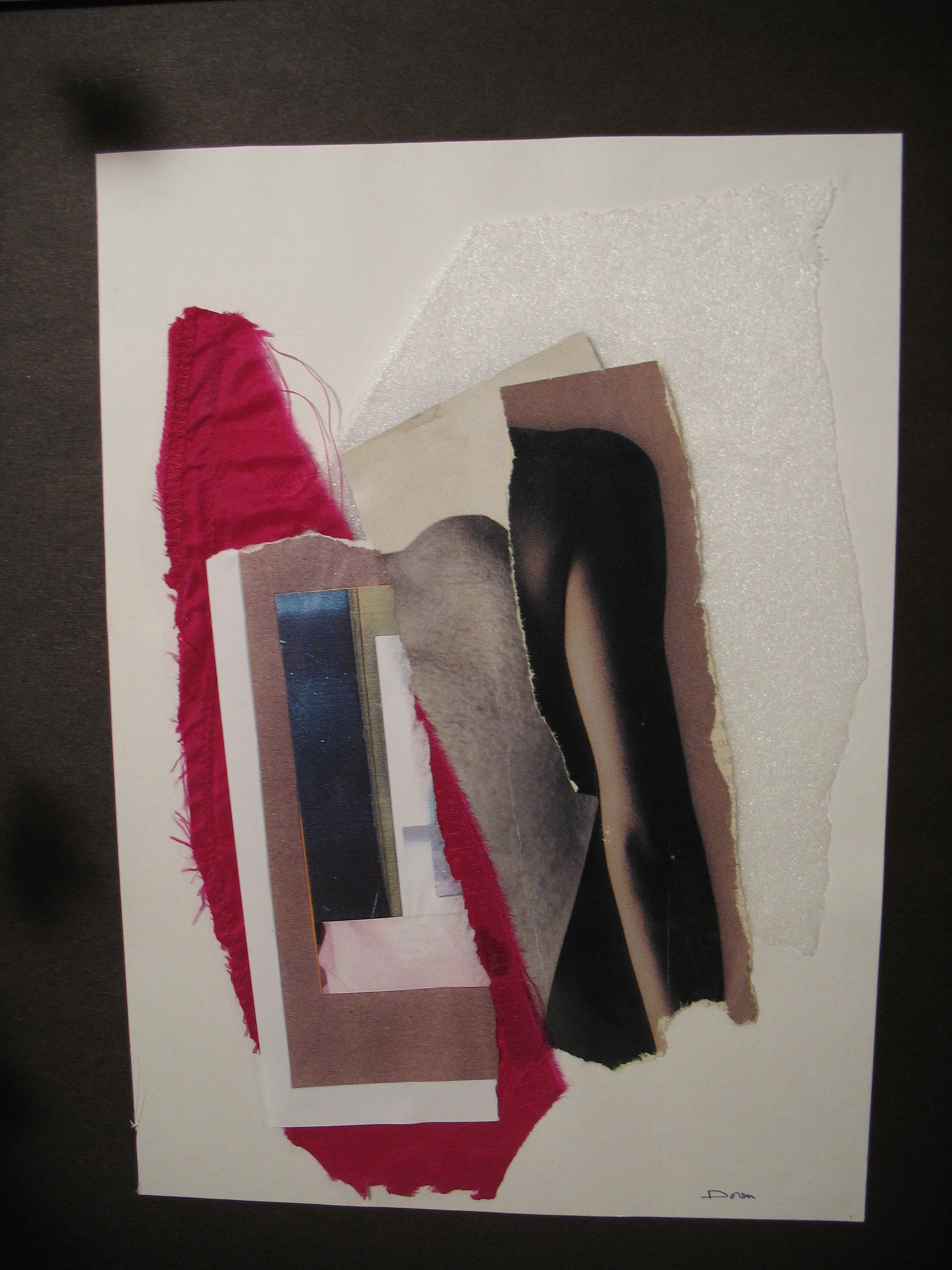
"Married Shoulders" created with photos, silk, cloth, and cut-outs, by Doren Robbins

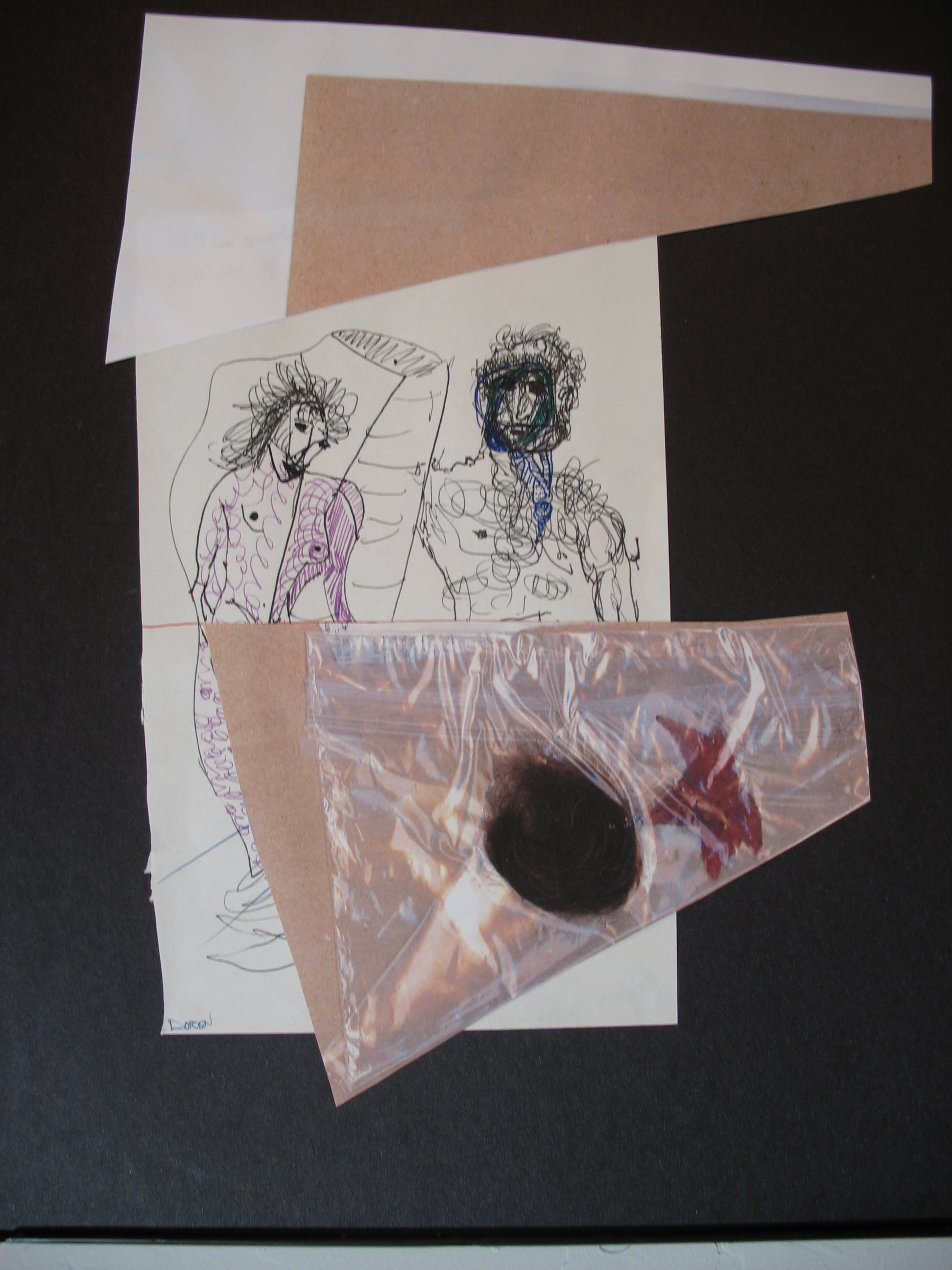
"Untitled Conversation" created with ink, leaf, and hair trimming in plastic bag with oak leaf, by Doren Robbins

== Teaching ==
Robbins has been a teacher of Creative Writing, Poetry, English Composition, Shakespeare, and Multicultural Literature since 1991 at the University of Iowa, UCLA, East Los Angeles Community College, and California State University (Dominguez Hills). He has been awarded three times by the Foothill College Honors Institute for his teaching. Currently he is Professor of Creative Writing and Literature at Foothill College. Robbins was director of the Foothill College Writers' Conference 2003, 2006–2008.

== Education ==
Union Institute, BA, 1990. The University of Iowa, MFA, 1993. Two years post-graduate studies in literature, multiculturalism, and criticism at Indiana University of Pennsylvania, 1994–96.

== Early influences, development of poetry ==
Doren Robbins began actively publishing poetry in the 1970s. In 1969, while reading Henry Miller's The Time of the Assassins, his study of Arthur Rimbaud, Robbins became aware of Kenneth Rexroth's poetry through Miller's reference to Rexroth's remarkable "Memorial" for Dylan Thomas, "Thou Shalt Not Kill," about which Miller stated, "If one has any doubts about the fate which our society reserves for the poet, let him read this "'Memorial.'" During this early period of development Robbins had preceded reading Miller's book on Rimbaud with The Diary of Najinsky, Van Gogh's Letters, Kenneth Patchen's The Journal of Albion Moonlight, Jack Hirschman's Artaud Anthology, and Wilhelm Reich's The Murder of Christ, making the connection to Rexroth's elegy for Thomas timely in the way that it lyrically and convincingly categorizes and specifies the violent multi-faceted alienation of society with the vulnerability and ensuing martyrdom of certain artists. As suggested by Robbins' prose poem monologue "My Dylan Thomas," the Welsh poet was an inspiration and an early influence. At age eighteen Robbins attended a production of Sidney Michaels' Dylan: A Play Based On Dylan Thomas In America By John Malcolm Brinnin and Leftover Life To Kill By Caitlin Thomas. The production was an inspiration adding to Robbins's continuing study of Thomas's poetry with a new emphasis on sound, voice, and prosody in general. After a five-year period of studying many of the key books of Western literature, philosophy and politics, Robbins decided to search for a way to contact Rexroth who had become—through his essays in Bird in the Bush, Classics Revisited, and Assays; along with his Collected Shorter Poems, Collected Longer Poems, and his many books of translations—his initial literary guide. Robbins discovered from an old friend attending the University of California, Santa Barbara, that Rexroth taught a course in Poetry, Song, and Performance at UCSB. At the evening course, Robbins introduced himself to Rexroth who generously requested he recite his poems during the class performances. For several weeks thereafter Robbins was a visitor-participant in Rexroth's poetry seminar held in his home in Montecito. They remained in contact until Rexroth's death in 1982. The events in 1971, and the ensuing friendship with Rexroth would prove particularly decisive for Robbins' development as a poet and essayist. It was at this time that he re-connected with his old friend; poet, translator, art curator, and publisher John Solt who had become friends with Rexroth and his wife, Carol Tinker.

== Political sensibility ==
Clearly, as explored in his essay The Tropic of Rabelais, the Passage to Whitman: A Note on Poetry and Community, and his prose poem, Sympathetic Manifesto, honoring the anarchist organizer, lecturer and teacher Voltairine de Clerye, Robbins' working-class political sensibility is not simply one of dissidence and alienation. It could be stated that several of his poems from his earlier collections, such as For Pablo Neruda, Hooker with a Lily, They're Honking at a Woman, The Boss Jack Sterner had a Dream, Collecting Myself, or the later poems My Pico Boulevard, Gregor Samsa's Face, Her Friday, and his more recent poems Dignity in Naples and North Hollywood, Latina Worker, My Piece of the Puzzle, and Before and After Tampico display direct parallels to Marx's compassionate diatribe in his chapter "Alienated Labor" from the Economic and Philosophical Manuscripts, but the underlying thematics in Robbins' political poems are anarchist variations of the claims he made in the...Rabelais...Whitman essay alluded to above: Really, if our values are at all valuable, it would be a process of false logic to believe in anything that has to do with the world powers. The very fact that they have the means to help but no active concern for whole populations of unemployed, marginally employed, underfed people—aside from turning them into submissive robotized satellites of exploitative disgrace—shows that these powers are an invention of the ethically dispossessed."

Again, as in his Neruda poem, the notion of legendary individuals takes precedence over the social conditions they have pitted themselves against—de Clerye as a teacher and organizer is celebrated for her devotion to alleviating economic violence to immigrants and the poor, Neruda for a comparable political consciousness in his poems and his activism in Chilean politics; with Rabelais and Whitman he states that we never feel they are artists in the way we understand Antonin Artaud or William Burroughs to be, as understandable as their positions are—their work is almost exclusively a violent depiction of a desperately avaricious and alienated world, it is a literature of revolt, revulsion, and frustrated purgation. With Rabelais and Whitman we have the literature of liberation: imaginative, sexual, worldly, and above all humane.

Ultimately, Robbins' writings containing social issues can not be easily classified. On the one hand, his narrator cogently, even passionately explores and exposes injustices his characters' endure. There is a sense of working-class rage. Moreover, these poems have the effect of elegies to the actual human values abused by the world capitalist system and the various branches of the soviet communist system. However, his conclusions, if there is a remedy to be found in his writings, might be said to be founded in a poetically reductive idealism; for example, he concludes the prose poem "Sympathetic Manifesto" with these final lines: "I will always believe in the Revolution, and in something better: the rarer action, said Prospero, is in Virtue than in Vengeance" (60). And he concludes his essay on Charles Bukowski by stating that "To survive without adding to the horror is sometimes the best we can do; it is at least an effort that makes sense as a starting point. There is courage, discipline, and cunning in the effort. Finally, what remains after a poet's survival, which is not an inconsequential matter in our culture—is the art. In the art of Bukowski the most central theme, both comically and tragically, is simply the passion to exist, to take it as it comes, recount what it was all about, and, paradoxically, recount the butchery done to that passion, and the butchery endured, by humans."

Finally, there does not appear to be a consistent "reductive" quality in his interpretations and conclusions but a variety of crucial insights and problem-solving or lamentably unsolvable approaches; here his path of interpretative and representative response and expression finds allegiance with Bertolt Brecht in his statement that "Complex seeing must be practiced." Current poems that exemplify his radical working-class, anti-war complexity are "Predators' Hour2, Open All Night" and "Ash Lands." Each poem can be found at pemmicanpress.com. Regarding Robbins' poetry, Bill Mohr has stated that

Art supposedly gives us aesthetic distance. Knowing the limited capacity of art to redeem anybody's suffering, Robbins' poems provide no such obvious safety net. On the other hand, the voice in his poems, with its impeccable contralto of hope and revulsion, reminds us not to accept any limits other than our own resilient skepticism.

On his web site, one of the quotes Robbins refers to from Albert Camus concretely supports the paradox of artistic skepticism: "Art itself could probably not produce the renascence which implies justice and liberty. But without it, that renascence would be without forms and, consequently, would be nothing."

== Cultural work ==
Influenced by several alternative poetry journals of the period, such as George Hitchcock's Kayak, Clayton Eshleman's Caterpillar, and Robert Bly's The Seventies with its emphases on "wild association", political poetry, and critical book reviews, Robbins co-founded the literary Journal, Third Rail (Los Angeles, CA 1975), with fellow poet Uri Hertz. He co-edited until 1980, remaining as a contributing editor until 1982. The avant-garde of the period had at least two specific modernist traditions. One, was the ongoing longer-poem development of a personal-historical, disjunctive, elliptical, interior monologue and collage form like that of Ezra Pound's Cantos, William Carlos Williams's Paterson, Louis Zukofsky's "A", and Charles Olsen's The Maximus Poems. The shorter, lyrical development continued out of the non-referential poems of Gertrude Stein's Tender Buttons, the French "cubist" poetry of Pierre Reverdy, and the short, sometimes opaque poems of the American poets George Oppen, the aforementioned Zukofsky, and to a certain extent their inheritors Robert Duncan, Robert Creeley, and the Beat Generation poet Philip Whalen. On the other hand, Beat poets Allen Ginsberg, Harold Norse, and Charles Bukowski carried on the Whitman tradition of the authentic voice, "I was the man, I suffered, I was there." Eshleman's Caterpillar combined both traditions, including that of European and Latin American surrealism. Similar to George Hitchcock's Kayak and Eshleman's Caterpillar, Robert Bly's magazine represented an international modernist faction closely related to surrealism, but a surrealism driven by emotional and sociological dynamics forcing the poet to invent a new imagery, not always aligned with rational analysis, as compared to a surrealism of "automatic writing" often leaving the reader with an alternate disappointment to that of the game of indeterminacy and abstract expression resulting in the majority of language poets. To this end Bly emphasized the works of Georg Trakl, Federico García Lorca, César Vallejo and Pablo Neruda in particular. There is a good deal of reductive theorizing and a certain degree of non-substantive depth psychology fantasizing in Bly's arguments, while his own poetry, surreal and otherwise, often struggles with the effects of sentimentality and bathos; however, his influence urging poets toward a more passionate sense of psychoanalytic personal and radical social awareness, imagery and association cannot be underestimated. For Hertz and Robbins, at least up to 1982, it appears the generally mutual focus of Third Rail was basically connected to the paths Kayak, Caterpillar, and The Seventies were taking. That is, there was a strong interest in continuing the development of an international poetry, generally written in a language Rexroth himself referred to as "the international idiom". From 1975–1982, Third Rail published works by Henry Miller, Walter Lowenfels, Kenneth Rexroth, Robert Bly, Jack Micheline, Christopher Buckley, Douglas Blazek, Andrea Hollander Budy, Naomi Shihab Nye, Barbara Szerlip, Kazuko Shiraishi, Takahashi Shinkichi, Paul Eluard, Blaise Cendrars, Pablo Neruda, Juan Armando Epple, Pablo Antonio Cuadra, Natalia Gorbanevskaia, Anna Akhmatova and many lesser known poets. The journal also published special sections on political events, such as "Poets on Chile, Neruda, Allende" (1976) and "Poets Against Nuclear Power" (1980). Hertz and Robbins conducted interviews with the internationally renowned Japanese poet, Kazuko Shiraishi, and surrealist poet and founder of Kayak Press, George Hitchcock. Robbins regularly published his poems in the journal along with critiques of the poetry of William Pillin, Philip Whalen, Bert Meyers, Clayton Ehsleman, Katerina Gogou, and Carol Tinker.

In 1994, Robbins was a guest editor for the Japanese-based Literary Journal, Electric Rexroth. His selection of contemporary poets and prose poets included work by Sharon Doubiago, Linda Janakos, Robert Bly, Gerald Stern, Philip Levine, Ralph Salisbury, Ingrid Wendt, Clayton Eshlemen, Marvin Bell, and Tania Pryputniewicz. Robbins' selections for Electric Rexroth were informed by a desire to present poems that contested at least two of the crucial criticisms of contemporary narrative lyrical poetry: one, that imagery had become convenient rather than fresh and emotionally driven; and two, the anecdotal self-consciousness pervading mainstream poetry had resulted in a lack of urgency in speech rhythms, while the effects of sound had become routine to the point of cliché. The narrative idiosyncrasies, unique imagery and fantasy, idiomatic freshness, emotional and philosophical insights in Sharon Doubiago's, "Someone waiting for me among the violins," Philip Levine's, "The Simple Truth," Tania Pryputneiwicz's "Labor," and Gerald Stern's "Ducks Are for Our Happiness," are four of the fourteen selections that clearly stand as testimonials for the ongoing vitality of original expression continuing to generate out of the Whitman-W.C. Williams tradition, emphasizing poetry written in a common language close to American idiomatic speech. Two other works Robbins selected for Electric Rexroth, Robert Bly's "An Open Rose," and "Grandma's Myth" by Linda Drand (aka Linda Janakos), are, respectively, strong representations of prose poetry and the hybrid prose poem-short fiction form Robbins himself would develop in his 2004 book, Parking Lot Mood Swing: Autobiographical Monologues and Prose Poetry (Cedar Hill Press).

== Themes ==
Ethnic and working-class themes are embodied in the characters and narrators in Doren Robbins' poems. Most of these characters are family members or friends Robbins worked with when he was pantry man, broiler chef, deliveryman, book store clerk, or carpenter. Whether they be family members that escaped pogroms in Ukraine, deserted the Russian Revolution, survived WWI, WWII, the American-Korean War, or contemporary veterans and immigrants that returned from the American-Vietnam War or the violent conflicts in Latin America, many of these characters are survivors of the ongoing industry of international civilized violence. The storytellers that passed on the historical experience of persecution, exploitation, rape, and murder are legendary characters in the sense that they had the will and the luck to emigrate and survive. Some of these characters appear in the poems "Before and After Tampico", "Four Family", and "My Pico Boulevard". The later poem literally emphasizes and politicizes the French poet Blaise Cendrars' declaration and manifesto, "Poetry is in the Streets" ("Le Poesy es en la rue"), while extending his claim to the notion that the poetry emerging from these streets is historical and demands a radical disclosure and expression regarding the ideologies of power and censorship underlying and undermining the subject. These and several other of his poems are a compassionate and bitter witnessing of injustice and attest to a realism with ethical concerns stretching back to the Jewish Prophets of the First Testament. One of his more noted poems, "For Neruda", his elegy to the Chilean poet Pablo Neruda, commemorates the life and work of Neruda as one to be celebrated for his compassion, dissidence, and rage, not only for his remarkable love poems, or for his allegiance to Joseph Stalin.

Robbins' notion of the legendary individual is not associated with archetypal patterns that are readily universal, but with archetypal characters that are autonomous in relation to the uniqueness of time, place, and culture. Furthermore, these characters are not epic or tragic heroes; they are cooks, carpenters and war veterans making enough to live month-to-month, a political exile saving money to bring the rest of his family across the U.S. border, a guy who survived a concentration camp working the delicatessen counter, waitresses and cashiers working in poor coffee shops and department stores. His poems "Anna", and "Dvayda", display the tradition of the legendary common woman linked to Chaucer's Wife of Bath with her exceptional forthrightness or Shakespeare's Emilia with her erotic honesty and her ethical, non-negotiable good will. The struggles and comradeship of the two main characters of B. Traven's The Death Ship can be seen in a parallel frame with the aforementioned poem, "Before and After Tampico."

For Robbins, the Ars Poetica of "Poetry is in the Streets" does not erase the imaginative drive for creating complex narrative poems that modulate space and time, utilize unusual or surreal images, hyperbolic and ecstatic metaphors with the purpose in essence being to create and perform highly rhythmic lyrical-narrative poems capable of carrying a variety of the tones of emotional expression. Unlike the elegies to the renowned poets Neruda or Pavese, one of the poems that best represents Robbins' method is the elegy, "Name a Dish After Me", written about the early death of his brother-in-law, John Mazak, who was a cook. Here the leaps and associations from Mazak's death to his childhood, to scenes of his surviving daughters and sister, to the speaker's reflections and fantasies musically build-up to an emotionally intricate closure.

Robbins has also created a substantial body of poems exploring the conflicts and celebrating the ecstasy and emotional complexity of married life, including the unique bond between parent and child. These poems are included in his earlier books Sympathetic Manifesto and Seduction of the Groom. The strongest examples of earlier poems in this genre are "In-terminal Rose", "Seduction of the Groom", "Dreaming of a Daughter", and "In the Middle of a Fight". Examples from his more recent collections Double Muse, The Donkey's Tale Driving Face Down, and "My Piece of the Puzzle, include "You Have Brought So Much To This Marriage. And So Have I", "Marc Chagall and the Male Soul", "I Went Through a Box of Emily's Shell Jewelry", "The Eighties"; and from current published poems: "Pulled Over", "The Fire Petal", "The Weaving", "The Sexiest Part", "My Boat, My Waves", and "Badlands and Outlands".

While the poems listed above are products of a sensual, emotionally confrontational, and melancholic sensibility, "Badlands and Outlands" (Double Muse 1998) is the longest and most ambitious of his love poems. As compared to the overall compilation of his poems exploring divisions or celebrating sex and intimate companionship, "Badlands and Outlands" is a meditation on a divided and partially formed personality, a possibly undependable sexually charged partner who is still aware of the potential for a way out of marital commitment. The narrator observes his habits and behaviors with their sometimes self-destructive drives (self-destructive in the sense that intimate trust is damaged by lust); he faces "not exhilaration,/ not imagery, [but] some other shore/ where celebrating stops […]" And yet, there is "…the sustaining presence / of Venus Janakosov" and, finally, his connecting attraction for her is "crested, empathic, vulgar." The poem, for all of its self-destructive plunging and reflection is a commitment to marriage resonating with fertility and ambiguity: "momentary undermined attentions, in Florence—/ the fatigue and vibrant tone,/ the sunflower's hole cragged with seeds, in Florence,/ the frame without angles, in Florence."

== Style, form, and themes ==
Many poets confronting the limitations of lineation in poetry, while desiring a wider subject matter and freedom in the approach to style, have turned to the prose poem. In his craft statement on writing prose poetry Robbins noted, "I do not work in formal structures, but I have worked diligently to create 'free verse' and prose poem styles that retain the dynamics of what Whitman called 'the poetic quality'[…]" It is well known that Ford Maddox Ford and Ezra Pound believed poetry should be at least as well written as prose; the opposite is also true, especially in terms of sensitivity to sound, not to mention an active rhythmic phrasing flowing directly or erratically as emotional tone forces arrangements of meaning. Arguably, the collage technique of monologue, short fiction, prose poem, interior monologue, and vaudeville-influenced dialogue reflect an attraction to Chaucer's high mockery in House of Fame, Bottom's dream from A Midsummer Night's Dream, as well Shakespeare's other "clowns" in Othello and particularly the "philosophizing" clown in King Lear.

Robbins' first prose collection, Parking Lot Mood Swing: Autobiographical Monologues and Prose Poetry, certainly displays an affinity with Sterne's enlightened absurdities and non-liner style in Tristram Shandy. His prose poem essay in Bear Flag Republic notes with appreciation the writings of Louis-Ferdinand Celine, Henry Miller, Samuel Beckett, Marguerite Young, Kurt Vonnegut Jr., Thomas Bernhard, Stephen Dixon, and Kenneth Patchen of the previously noted Journal of Albion Moonlight. Such works as "Chaucer's Quill, Sappho's Libido, Frida Kahlo's Eye Brows", "Dealing With the Insomnia Surf", "Pantagruel Antigruel", "As Much Sex as Elvis", "Green Torso", and "Whitman, Artaud, and the Punk Nation", from Parking Lot Mood Swing appear to be a natural form for supporting his drive to include in a serio-comic poetic language subjects and details usually left out of poetry. Whether these "omissions" are implicit to the ongoing decorum of lyric poetry, or if the matter revolves around the restrictions of lineation as compared to the reality of including unlimited material expressed in rhythmic sentences, Robbins recent publications indicate he has opted for working in this genre along with his ongoing lyric-narrative output. Supporting this claim are several prose examples published after Parking Lot Mood Swing, such as "Alternate Robonovich, Adjunct", "Nothing but an Ear", "Arlon's Talking to Himself Memoir", from the forthcoming novella, Twin Extra (Highmoonoon 2010); and "Just My Luck", "My Defects Call Me Back", and "Night Song" from the Bear Flag Republic prose poem anthology.

== Bibliography ==
Poetry

- My Piece of the Puzzle (Eastern Washington University, 2008). Awarded the Josephine Miles PEN Oakland Award in Poetry 2008.
- Driving Face Down, (Eastern Washington University, 2001). Awarded The Blue Lynx

Prize in Poetry 2001.

- The Donkey's Tale (Red Wind Books, 1998).
- Double Muse (Rabble-A Press,1997)
- Dignity in Naples and North Hollywood, introduction by Philip Levine (Pennywhistle

Press, 1996)

- Two Poems (Rabble-A press 1995)
- Under the Black Moth's Wings (Ameroot, 1987)
- Sympathetic Manifesto (Perivale Books, 1986)
- Seduction of the Groom (Loom press, 1982).
- The Roots and the Towers (Third Rail Press, 1980)
- Detonated Veils (Third Rail Press, 1976)

Short Fiction

- Parking Lot Mood Swing: Autobiographical Monologues and Prose Poetry (Cedar Hill Publications 2004).
- Twin Extra (Highmoonoon, fall 2010).

Criticism Doren Robbins has published critical essays and articles on Kenneth Rexroth, George Oppen, Phillip Levine, Deborah Eisenberg, Michael McClure, Philip Whalen, Charles Bukowski, Thomas McGrath, Larry Levis, Bob Dylan, Carol Tinker, Katerina Gogou, Ellen Bass and Kazuko Shiraishi among others in The Iowa Journal of Cultural Studies, The Daily Iowan, Third Rail, Onthebus, Caliban and others.

== Awards and prizes ==
- Josephine Miles PEN Oakland Award in Poetry 2008.
- Pushcart Prize 4th Nomination by Andrea Hollander Budy, 2007.
- Paterson Literary Review, Editor's Choice, "Just My Luck," 2006.
- Paterson Literary Review, Editor's Choice, "The Song I Know My Father By," 2005.
- Americas Review, Honorable mention for "Natural History." Judge: Jane Hirshfield. 2004.
- Indiana Review Poetry Award, Honorable Mention for "Gulls." Judge: Mark Doty. 2002.
- Paterson Lit Review, Allen Ginsberg Award, Honorable Mention Prize for the poem "Four Family." 2002. Judge: Maria Mazziotti Gillan.
- Pushcart Prize 3rd Nomination by Dorianne Laux and Christopher Howell, 2002.
- Pushcart Prize 2nd Nomination by Sharon Dubiago, 2001.
- Blue Lynx Prize for Poetry for Driving Face Down. Judge: Dorianne Laux, 2001.
- River Styx, International Poetry Contest, Honorable Mention. Judge: Molly Peacock. 1998.
- Literal Latte, Poetry Awards, New York. Third Prize. Judge: Carol Muske Dukes. 1998.
- National Poetry Series Finalist. Book of poems: Cloth of Cilantro, 1997.
- Kathryn M. Morton Poetry Prize Finalist. Book of Poems: Cloth of Cilantro, 1998.
- Centrum Residency Program, Washington. Full Fellowship, Writing Residency, 1997.
- The Chester H. Jones Foundation, Ohio. Commendation Prize, 1997. Judges: Diane Wakoski and David Bottoms.
- Pushcart Prize 1st Nomination. Poem: "Beneath the Jewish Music," nominated by Hayden's Ferry Review, 1996.
- Oregon Literary Arts, Oregon. Fellowship in Poetry, 1996.
- Judah Magnes Museum, California. Anna Davidson Rosenberg Award, First Prize, 1996.
- The Chester H. Jones Foundation, Ohio. Commendation Prize, 1996. Judge: Wakoski.
- Bumbershoot, Washington. Reader at the Seattle Arts Festival, Summer, 1996.
- Lane Literary Guild, Oregon. First Prize and Publication, Summer, 1996.
- The Chester H. Jones Foundation, Ohio. Commendation Prize, 1993. Judge: Wakoski.
- The Loft Foundation, Minnesota. Full Fellowship. Reader in a festschrift for poet Thomas McGrath on the occasion of his 70th birthday, Fall, 1985.
- California Arts Council. Co-Editor of Third Rail Journal. 1980.
