= Eva Kollisch =

Austrian-American author and activist (1925–2023)

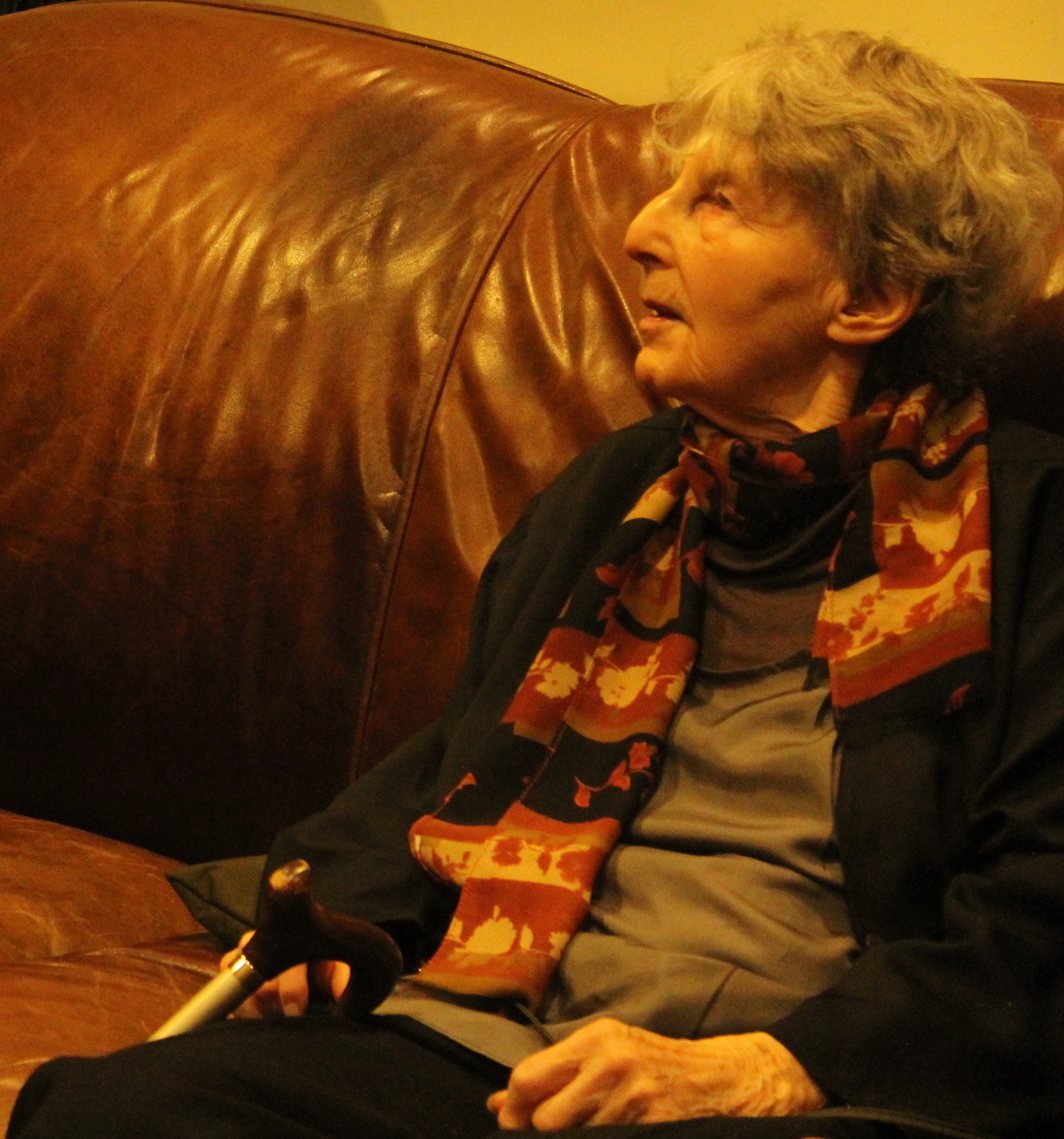
Kollisch at Kelly Writers House in 2016

Eva Kollisch (August 17, 1925 – October 10, 2023) was an Austrian-American lesbian rights activist and writer. She is best known for co-founding the pioneering Women's Studies department at Sarah Lawrence College, and her activist work in feminist, anti-war, and lesbian rights movements.

== Early life ==
Eva Maria Kollisch was born on August 17, 1925, in Vienna, Austria, to poet and journalist Margarete Kollisch and architect Otto Kollisch. She and her two siblings were raised secular Jewish in Baden, where she faced antisemitic bullying from a young age. Kollisch attended school in Baden until 1938, when the Nazi Party annexed Austria. She was briefly moved to a boarding school for Jewish girls in Vienna, until she and her brothers fled via the Kindertransport to England in 1939. The family reunited in 1940 in Staten Island, where Kollisch graduated from Curtis High School and worked in factories through the end of World War II.

== Workers Party involvement and education ==
While still in high school, Kollisch joined the Trotskyist Workers Party. She worked as a labor organizer for the party from 1941 to 1946, and moved to Manhattan and later Detroit after graduating high school to work on a Jeep assembly line. While in the Party, she met her first husband, Stanley Plastrik, the founder of the leftist magazine Dissent, whom she married in 1942. She became disillusioned and frustrated by the male leadership of the Workers Party and left it, divorcing Plastrik at the same time, in 1946 to attend Brooklyn College, where she studied German literature and science and graduated in 1951.

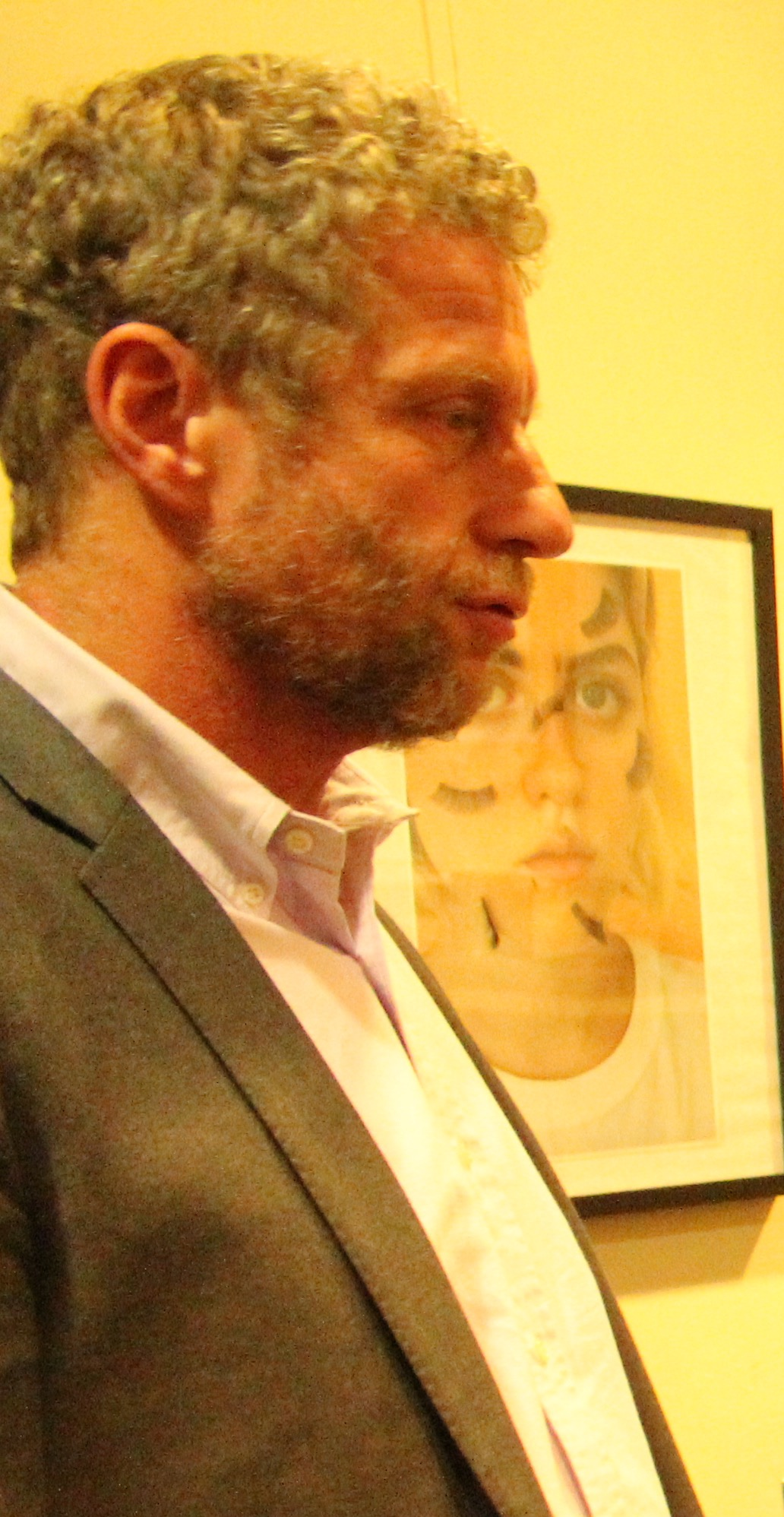
Uri Berliner at Kelly Writers House in 2016

In 1950, Kollisch married Gert Berliner, a German-born Abstract Expressionist artist. The couple helped operate the collectively-run Cafe Rienzi in Greenwich Village, which was a popular bohemian spot frequented by writers such as Allen Ginsberg, James Baldwin, and Jack Kerouac. Kollisch and Berliner moved to New Mexico, where she gave birth to her only son, Uri Berliner, in 1956. The family returned to New York City and Kollisch and Berliner separated in 1959. Kollisch began studying at Columbia University, and she graduated with her master's in German in 1963. Later that year, she began teaching at Brooklyn College and Sarah Lawrence College.

== Academic career and activism ==
Kollisch primarily taught Comparative Literature and German at Sarah Lawrence, and in the early 1970s, she helped found the school's Women's Studies department along with Joan Kelly, Sherry Ortner, and Gerda Lerner. The program was one of the earliest of its kind, and offered the first graduate degree in women's history in the United States. In the late 1970s, Kollisch served as the director of the Center for Continuing Education at Sarah Lawrence. She also continued to socialize with the writers and intellectuals of Greenwich Village, and dated writer Susan Sontag. She also participated in feminist and anti-war movements; she was arrested twice while protesting the Vietnam War, and was involved with the Women in Black group and the 1983 Seneca Women's Encampment protest.

== Memoirs and later life ==
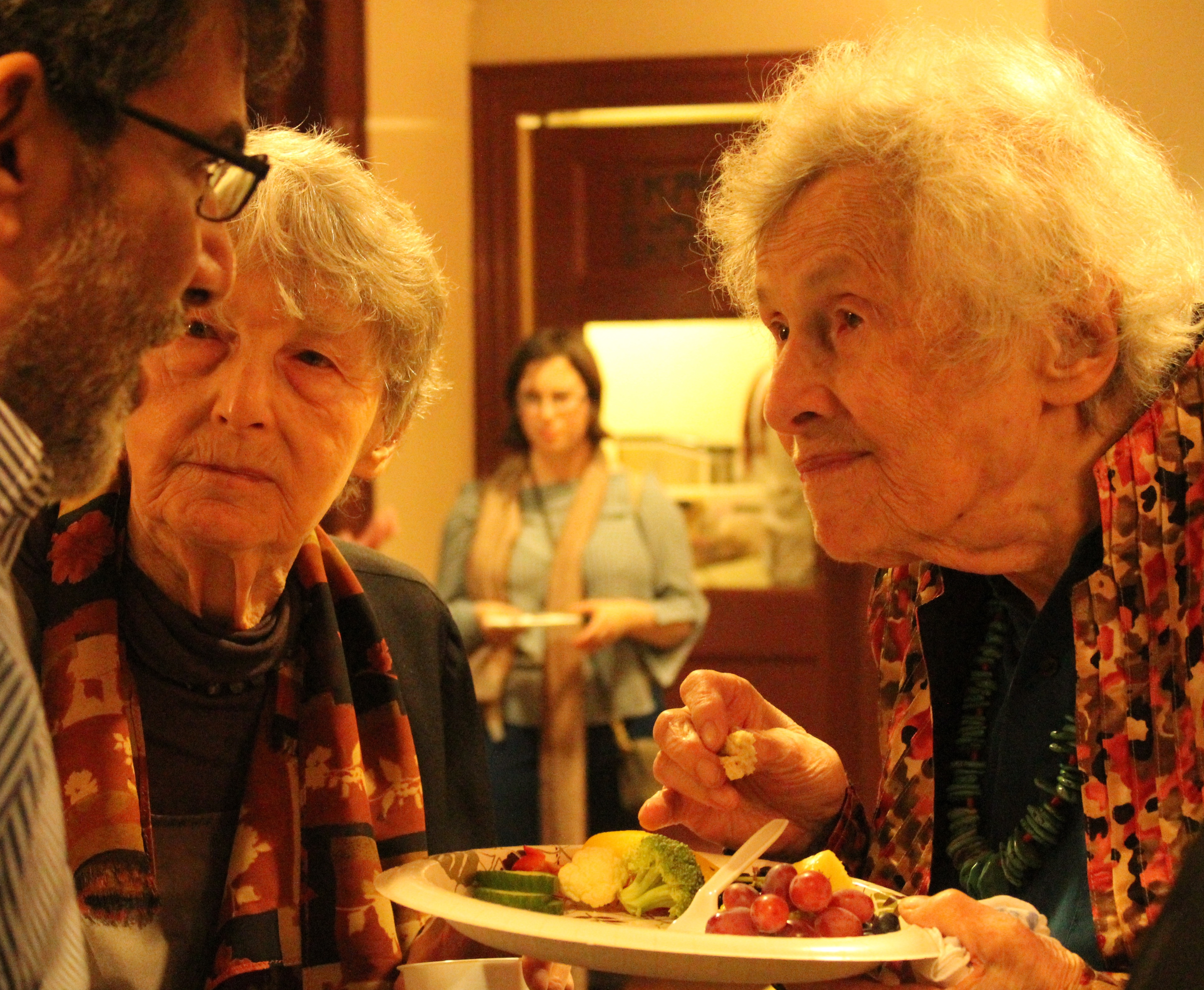
Left to right: Al Filreis, Kollisch, Naomi Replansky at Kelly Writers House in 2016

Kollisch taught at Sarah Lawrence until her retirement in 1993. She continued to write magazine articles and anthologies, and published two memoirs, Girl in Movement in 2000 and The Ground under My Feet in 2008.

In 1986, Kollisch's Sarah Lawrence colleague, Grace Paley, introduced her to Naomi Replansky at a Gay Women's Alternative poetry reading. They were married in 2009, and in 2016, the couple received the Clara Leimlich Social Activist Award from Labor Arts. Kollisch and Replansky lived together in Manhattan until Replansky's death in early 2023. Kollisch died from a chest infection on October 10, 2023, at the age of 98. Her archival papers are held in the Sophia Smith Collection of Women's History at Smith College.
