= Shirley Abbott (author) =

American writer (1934–2019)

- Born: Shirley Jean Abbott; November 16, 1934; Hot Springs, Arkansas, U.S.
- Died: April 8, 2019 (aged 84); Portland, Oregon, U.S.
- Education: Texas State College for Women
- Occupations: Magazine editor, writer, journalist, historian
- Spouse: Alexander W. Tomkievicz (m. 1964; died 2012)
- Children: 2
- Writing career
- Notable awards: Porter Prize (2005)

Shirley Jean Tomkievicz (née Abbott; November 16, 1934, Hot Springs, Arkansas – April 8, 2019, Portland, Oregon) was an American magazine editor, writer, journalist, and historian.

== Early life and education ==
Born Shirley Jean Abbott in Hot Springs, Arkansas, her father was a bookmaker who took bets on illegal, off-track horse races, but was quixotically a well-respected member of the community. Abbott graduated in 1952 from high school in Hot Springs, Arkansas, as class valedictorian and in 1956 with a bachelor's degree (cum laude) in English and French from Texas State College for Women (renamed in 1957 Texas Woman’s University). In 1956 she, as one of the winners of an essay contest, was one of twenty young women that Mademoiselle magazine's editors selected as paid guest editors in New York City for their College Issue. Abbot took the job in New York City to escape the segregated South, which she found distasteful. For a brief time from 1956 to 1957 she worked in New York City as an editorial assistant for Henry Holt and Company. She was for the academic year 1957–1958 a Fulbright Scholar at the University of Grenoble and for the academic year 1958–1959 a scholarship graduate student in the French department of Columbia University. She decided she did not want to teach French and left graduate school.

== Career ==
In 1959 Abbott was hired in New York City by Horizon: A Magazine of the Arts, where she worked for over 15 years and was for several years the magazine's editor-in-chief. As the Encyclopedia of Arkansas notes, "Abbott wrote articles for Smithsonian, Lear’s, Gourmet, Harper’s, American Heritage, Southern Living, McCall’s, Glamour, and Boston Review, as well as for newspapers. In addition to the people and history of Arkansas, she wrote about food, historic properties, and museums".

For 25 years, she worked as a journalist and editor for the UC Berkeley Wellness Letter, published by the UC Berkeley School of Public Health in collaboration with University Health Publishing in New York City.

On September 11, 2001, in her apartment about one mile (1.6 kilometer) from the World Trade Center, Shirley Abbott Tomkievicz was talking on her phone to a friend when the first plane struck. The World Trade Center's destruction played a significant role in The Future of Love, her first (and only) novel.

In September 1964 in Manhattan she married Alexander W. Tomkievicz (1926–2012), a commercial artist. From 1995 to 2012 she and her husband lived in semi-retirement in their house in Haydenville, Massachusetts (although they continued to own an apartment in New York City). When he died, she moved back to New York City.

In 2005 she received Arkansas's Porter Prize for her non-fiction. In 2008 she was elected to the Arkansas's Writers Hall of Fame.

In the last years of her life she bought a house in Portland, Oregon and moved there from New York City to be near the family of one of her daughters. Upon her death from cancer in 2019 at age 84, she was survived by her two daughters and three grandchildren.

== Books ==
- Abbott, Shirley (1981). The National Museum of American History. Harry N. Abrams, Inc. ISBN 0-8109-1363-1.
- —— (1983). Womenfolks: Growing Up Down South. New York: Ticknor and Fields. 2017 pbk reprint. University of Arkansas Press. January 25, 2017. ISBN 978-1-68226-023-4.
  - —— (December 1982). "Southern Women & the Indispensable Myth (excerpt from Womenfolks)". American Heritage. 34 (1).
- —— (1988). Historic Charleston. Oxmoor House. ISBN 0848707567.
- —— (1991). The Bookmaker's Daughter: A Memory Unbound. New York: Ticknor and Fields. 2006 pbk reprint. University of Arkansas Press. 2006. ISBN 0-89919-518-0.
- —— (1998). Love's Apprentice: The Education of a Modern Woman. Boston: Houghton Mifflin. ISBN 0395673690.
- —— (2008). The Future of Love: A Novel. Chapel Hill, North Carolina: Algonquin Books. ISBN 978-1-56512-567-4.
