= Leon Stokesbury =

American poet (1945–2018)

- Born: 1945; Oklahoma City, Oklahoma, U.S.
- Died: November 13, 2018 (aged 72–73)
- Occupation: Poet
- Education: University of Arkansas (MFA); Florida State University (PhD)
- Notable awards: Porter Prize (1985); Poets' Prize (1998)

Leon Stokesbury (1945 Oklahoma City – November 13, 2018) was an American poet.

== Life ==
He graduated from the University of Arkansas with an MFA, and earned his Ph.D. at Florida State University. He taught creative writing at Georgia State University.

== Awards ==
- 1999 National Endowment for the Arts Grant
- 1998 Poets' Prize
- 1990 Robert Frost Fellowship in Poetry from the Breadloaf Writers Conference
- 1992 Distinguished Georgia Poet of the Year Award
- 1985 Porter Prize

== Works ==
- "Unsent Letter to My Brother in His Pain", Good Times Santa Cruz
- Autumn Rhythm: New and Selected Poems. University of Arkansas Press. 1996. ISBN 978-1-55728-438-9.
- The Drifting Away. Fayetteville: University of Arkansas Press. 1986. ISBN 978-0-938626-51-0.
- The royal nonesuch. Anhinga Press. 1984. ISBN 978-0-938078-17-3.
- Chance of showers. Florida State University. 1984.
- Often in Different Landscapes. Austin: University of Texas Press. 1976. ISBN 9780292760042.
- You are Here: Poems New and Old. University of Arkansas Press. 2016.
- The Drifting Away of All We Once Held Essential. Trilobite Press. 1979.

=== Anthologies ===
- James Tate; David Lehman, eds. (1997). "Evening's End". The Best American Poetry 1997. Simon and Schuster. ISBN 978-0-684-81452-0.
- Dave Smith; David Bottoms, eds. (1985). The Morrow anthology of younger American poets. Quill. ISBN 978-0-688-03450-4.

=== Editor ===
- Leon Stokesbury, ed. (1990). Articles of war: a collection of American poetry about World War II. University of Arkansas Press. ISBN 978-1-55728-149-4.
- The Made Thing: An Anthology of Contemporary Southern Poetry. University of Arkansas Press. 1999. ISBN 978-1-55728-579-9. "Leon Stokesbury." 2nd edition.
- The Light the Dead See: The Selected Poems of Frank Stanford. Ed. Leon Stokesbury. University of Arkansas Press 1991.
