= Margarete Kollisch =

Austrian writer and poet

- Born: Margarete Moller; December 9, 1893; Vienna, Austria
- Died: October 11, 1979 (aged 85); Staten Island, New York City
- Education: Philology and education
- Alma mater: University of Vienna
- Occupations: Poet, Translator, Massage therapist
- Spouse: Otto Kollisch
- Children: Eva Kollisch
- Writing career
- Language: German
- Genre: Poetry
- Notable works: Wege und Einkehr, Unverlorene Zeit, Rückblendung,

Margarete Kollisch (born December 9, 1893, in Vienna; died October 11, 1979, in Staten Island, New York City) was an Austrian writer and poet who fled from the Nazis and continued her artistic creation in the United States.

== Biography ==
Kollisch was born Margarete Moller in Vienna, Austria as the daughter of the lawyer Ignaz Moller (1859–1937) and Hermine Moller née Bunzl-Federn (1870–1928). She attended a girls' school in Vienna and then studied philology at the University of Vienna. In 1917, she earned her teaching degree. During World War I, she worked as a nurse, earning a silver medal from the Red Cross. She also worked as a journalist and translator for the French Embassy in Vienna.

In 1923, she married architect Otto Kollisch, and the couple had three children: Steve, Peter, and Eva. After their youngest son, Peter, was born in 1928 the family moved to Baden near Vienna. When the Nazis annexed Austria, the family prepared to leave the country. In 1939, their children fled Austria on a Kindertransport to England. Otto Kollisch immigrated to the United States via England, and Margarete immigrated via the Netherlands, arriving in the U.S. in October 1939. Their three children joined them in 1940, and the family settled in the Staten Island borough of New York City. Margarete Kollisch worked as a massage therapist and gave private language instruction for most of the remainder of her life. Her youngest daughter, Eva Kollisch, has become a noted author as well and a professor for German, Comparative Literature, and Women's Studies at the Sarah Lawrence College. Eva Kollisch went to great lengths to review and preserve her mother's work.

== Creative writing career ==
Kollisch published many works in German, Austrian, and U.S.-American newspapers and journals throughout her life. After immigrating to the United States, Kollisch became part of a circle of writers in exile alongside Mimi Grossberg and others. She published the first anthology of her poetry, Wege und Einkehr (Paths and Retreats), in 1960 A second collection of poetry, Unverlorene Zeit (Unlost Time), followed in 1971. Her work was considered to fall into late romantic poetry, following Rilke and other German-language romantic poets. She also published work in the Austrian journal Literatur und Kritik alongside Mimi Grossberg, Maria Berl Lee, and Rose Ausländer. She was accepted into the Austrian PEN-Club in 1978. A third collection of Kollisch's poetry, Rückblendung, was published posthumously in 1981.
