= Uri Berliner =

American journalist (born 1956)

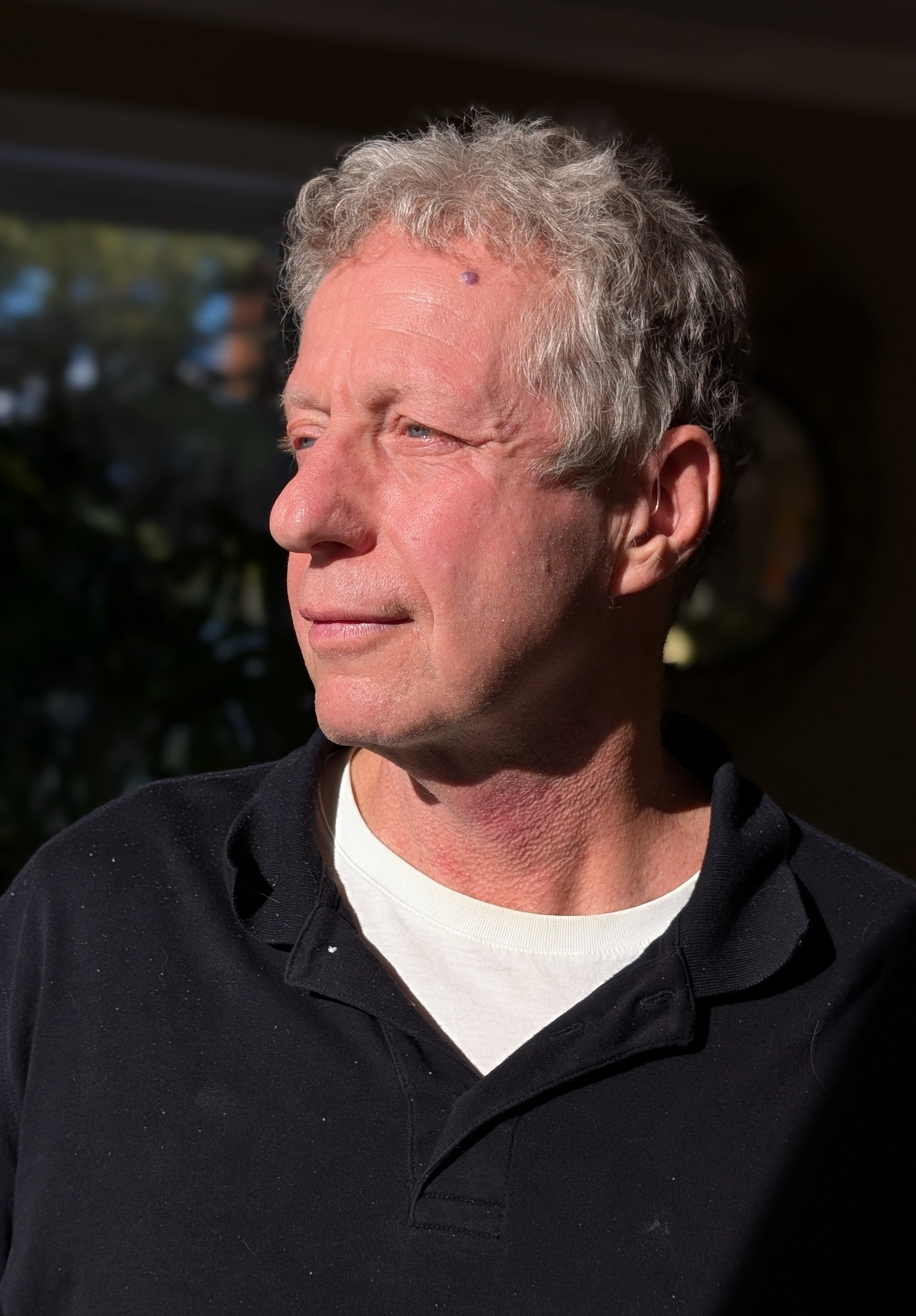
- Berliner in 2025
- Born: 1956 (age 69–70)
- Education: Sarah Lawrence College (BA); Columbia University (MA)
- Parent: Eva Kollisch

Uri Berliner (born 1956) is an American journalist who was the senior business editor for NPR from 1999 until his resignation in April 2024.

== Early life and education ==
Berliner was born in 1956 as the only child of the lesbian rights activist Eva Kollisch and the photographer and artist Gert Berliner, who married in 1948 and divorced in 1959. Gert's parents were captured by the Gestapo, sent to Auschwitz concentration camp, and murdered there in 1943.

Berliner is a 1977 graduate of Sarah Lawrence College. He holds a graduate degree in journalism from Columbia University. He was a Nieman Fellow at Harvard University in 1998.

== Career ==
Berliner began working for NPR in 1999. He oversaw business and economics coverage and supervised the program, "Planet Money," which covered the global economy.

His reporting has been recognized with, among others, a Peabody Award, a Loeb Award, an Edward R. Murrow Award, and a Society of Professional Journalists "New America" Award.

=== Essay criticizing NPR, resignation, The Free Press ===
On April 9, 2024, The Free Press published an essay by Berliner titled "I've Been at NPR for 25 Years. Here's How We Lost America's Trust". in which he criticized NPR for having "coalesced around the progressive worldview" and "an open-minded spirit no longer exists within NPR". Berliner contended that NPR had lost America's trust by representing only a narrow segment of the U.S. population in its coverage.

Berliner was given a five-day suspension without pay on April 12 for failing to secure approval for outside work. He resigned on April 17, saying he "cannot work in a newsroom where I am disparaged".

He joined The Free Press as a senior editor in June 2024.
