= Andrea Hollander Budy =

American poet (born 1947)

Andrea Hollander
- Born: April 28, 1947 (age 77); Berlin, Germany
- Occupation: Author, Poet

Website
- andreahollander.net

Andrea Hollander (born April 28, 1947 in Berlin, Germany) is an American poet. Her most recent poetry collection is Blue Mistaken for Sky (Autumn House Press, 2018). Her work has appeared in New Ohio Review, Poetry, The Georgia Review, The Gettysburg Review, New Letters, FIELD, Five Points, Shenandoah, and Creative Nonfiction. She was raised in Colorado, Texas, New York, and New Jersey, and educated at Boston University and the University of Colorado. From 1991 till 2013, Hollander was writer-in-residence at Lyon College. She was married from 1976 to 2011. Hollander lives in Portland, Oregon, where she teaches writing workshops at The Attic Institute for Arts and Letters and at Mountain Writers Series.

== Awards ==
- 2014 Oregon Literary Fellowship
- 2008 Subiaco Award for Literary Merit for Excellence in the Writing and Teaching of Poetry.
- 2007 National Endowment for the Arts Fellowship
- 1993 Nicholas Roerich Poetry Prize, for House Without a Dreamer
- 1992 Porter Prize
- 1991 National Endowment for the Arts Fellowship
- D. H. Lawrence Fellowship
- Runes Poetry Award
- Arkansas Arts Council fellowships

== Published works ==
Full-length poetry collections

- Blue Mistaken for Sky. Autumn House Press. 2018. ISBN 978-1-938769-33-7.
- Landscape with Female Figure: New & Selected Poems, 1982 - 2012. Autumn House Press. 2014. ISBN 978-1-932870-85-5.
- Woman in the Painting. Autumn House Press. 2006. ISBN 978-1-932870-11-4.
- The Other Life. Story Line Press. 2001. ISBN 978-1-885266-98-9.
- House Without a Dreamer. Story Line Press. 1995.
- What the other eye sees. Wayland Press. 1991. Chapbook

Anthologies edited

- Andrea Hollander Budy, ed. (2008). When She Named Fire: An Anthology of Contemporary Poetry by American Women. Autumn House Press. ISBN 978-1-932870-26-8.

Anthology publications

- Sonny Brewer, ed. (2005). "The Explanation". Stories from the Blue Moon Café IV. MacAdam/Cage Publishing. p. 39. ISBN 978-1-59692-142-9. "Andrea Hollander Budy."
- Jeanne Marie Beaumont; Claudia Carlson, eds. (2003). The poets' Grimm: 20th century poems from Grimm fairy tales. Story Line Press. ISBN 978-1-58654-027-2.
- Sue Ellen Thompson, ed. (2005). The Autumn House Anthology of Contemporary American Poetry. Autumn House Press. ISBN 978-1-932870-06-0.
- Bill Henderson, ed. (2003). Pushcart prize XXVII: best of the small presses. Pushcart Press. ISBN 978-1-888889-35-2.

== Reviews ==
Utterly of-the-moment and thoroughly inclusive, When She Named Fire, in step with this historical importance, will hold the attention of even the most well read of interested poetry connoisseurs: even those already well-acquainted with women writers in particular.

== See also ==
- Doren Robbins
