= Margaret Jones Bolsterli =

American writer

Margaret Jones Bolsterli (October 10, 1931 in Watson, Arkansas) is an American author, editor, and professor emerita of English. In 2012 she won the Porter Fund Literary Prize.

== Biography ==
Margaret Jones grew up, with her sister Pauline and her brothers Jodie and Bob and cousin Ted Willis, in the Mississippi flood plain of Desha County, Arkansas. There her father owned about 200 acres, which were worked by tenant farmers using mules, until the changes brought by mechanization and WW II. She graduated from high school in Dumas, Arkansas. Her high school graduating class consisted of 28 students.

Margaret Jones graduated in 1952 with a bachelor's degree from the University of Arkansas and in 1952 with an M.A. from Washington University in St. Louis. There she met Mark Bolsterli, who was a graduate student in physics. They married and had two sons, Eric (born 1957), and David (1959–2019). During the 1960s, the couple divorced. She graduated with a PhD in 1967 from the University of Minnesota. Her PhD thesis is entitled Bedford Park: a practical experiment in aesthetics. She was from 1967 to 1968 an assistant professor at Augsburg College and, from 1968 to 1993, a professor of English at the University of Arkansas. For the academic year 1985–1986 she was a Fulbright lecturer in Portugal. For the academic year 1997–1998 the Program in Agrarian Studies at Yale University gave her a fellowship to study agrarian history.

After retiring in 1993 as professor emerita, she lived and worked on her farm near Wesley, Arkansas. For many years she has had a close relationship with Olivia Sordo (b. 1944).

In addition to her books and articles, Margaret Jones Bolsterli wrote the libretto for an opera During Wind and Rain, which premiered in April 2017 at the Argenta Community Theater in North Little Rock. The music for the opera was written by Michael Rice.

== Books ==
- Bolsterli, Margaret Jones (1977). The early community at Bedford Park : "corporate happiness" in the first garden suburb. Routledge and Keegan Paul. ISBN 0-7100-8693-8.; USA edition. Athens, Ohio: Ohio University Press. 1977. ISBN 0821402242.
- ——— (1991). Born in the delta : reflections on the making of a Southern white sensibility. Knoxville: University of Tennessee Press. ISBN 0870496905; 152 pages; Bolsterli, Margaret (2000). pbk 2nd edition. University of Arkansas Press. ISBN 1557286167; 132 pages
- ——— (2008). During wind and rain: the Jones family farm in the Arkansas Delta, 1848–2006. Fayetteville: University of Arkansas Press. ISBN 978-1-55728-871-4.
- ——— (2012). Things you need to hear: collected memories of growing up in Arkansas, 1890–1980. Fayetteville: University of Arkansas Press. ISBN 978-1557289780; 160 pages, foreword by Bill Gatewood
- ——— (2015). Kaleidoscope: redrawing an American family tree. Fayetteville: The University Of Arkansas Press. ISBN 978-1-55728-815-8.

as editor:

- Jackson, Nannie Stillwell (1982). Vinegar pie and chicken bread: a woman's diary of life in the rural South, 1890–1891; edited with an introduction by Margaret Jones Bolsterli. Fayetteville: University of Arkansas Press. ISBN 0-938626-25-6.
- Daniel, Harriet Bailey Bullock (1993). A Remembrance of Eden: Harriet Bailey Bullock Daniel's memories of a frontier plantation in Arkansas, 1849–1872; edited with an introduction by Margaret Jones Bolsterli. Fayetteville: University of Arkansas Press. ISBN 1-55728-290-0; pbk; ISBN 1-55728-589-6 hbk
