= Jared Carter (poet) =

American poet and editor

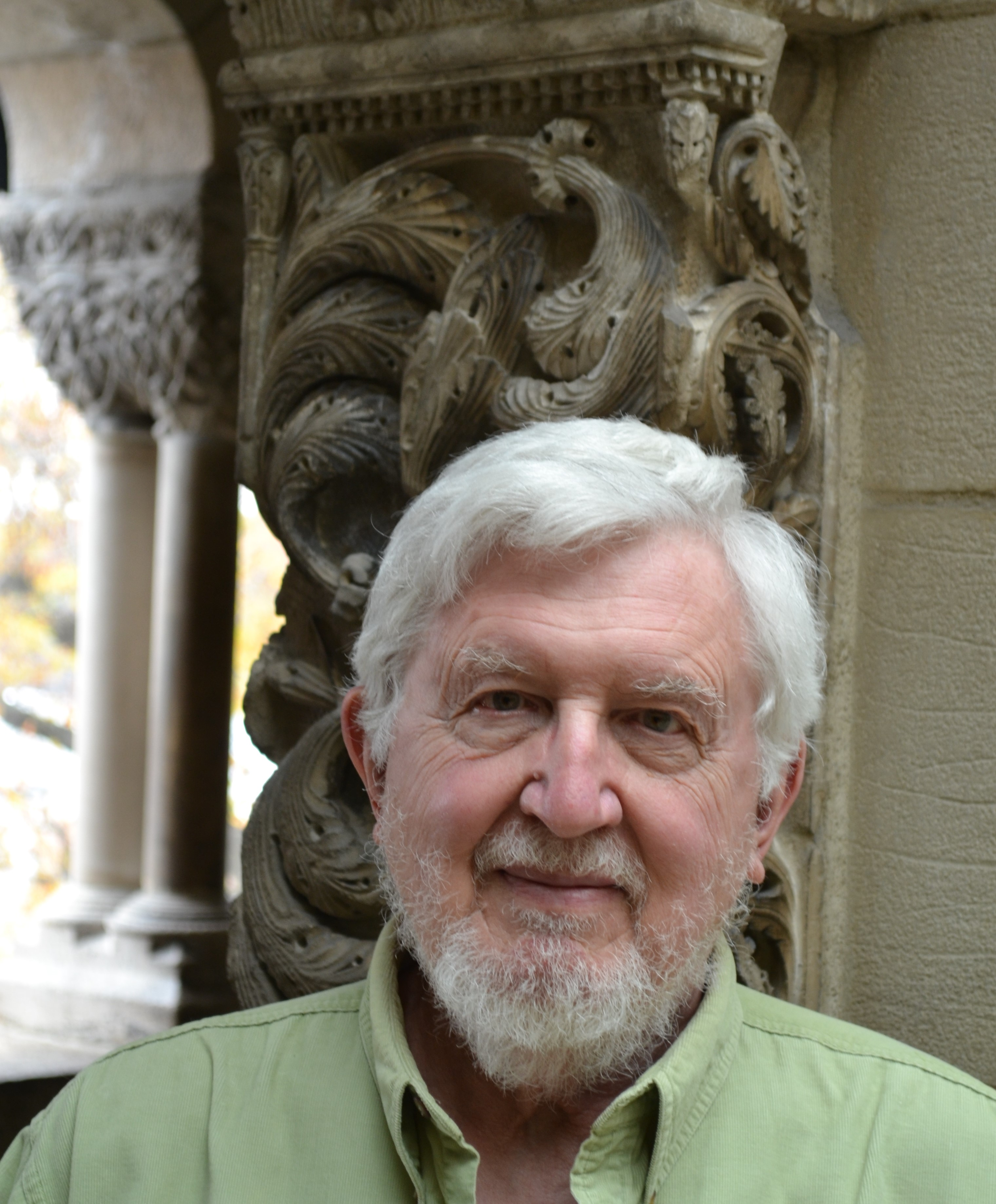
- Born: January 10, 1939 (age 87); Elwood, Indiana, U.S.
- Occupations: Poet, editor

Jared Carter (born January 10, 1939) is an American poet and editor.

== Life ==
Carter was born in 1939 in Elwood, Indiana, and attended Yale University and Goddard College. Before he became a poet, he worked as a newspaper journalist and served in the military.

== Poetry ==
Carter writes in free verse and in traditional forms. Much of his early work is set in "Mississinewa County", an imaginary place that includes the actual Mississinewa River, a tributary of the Wabash River.

In recent years, as he has published increasingly on the web, his poetry has ranged farther afield. His poems have appeared in The New Yorker, The Nation, Poetry, and other journals in the U.S. and abroad."

His first collection, Work, for the Night Is Coming (1981), won the Walt Whitman Award. His second, After the Rain (1993), was given the Poets' Prize. He has received two literary fellowships from the National Endowment for the Arts, a Guggenheim Fellowship, and the Indiana Governor's Arts Award.

== Awards ==
- Able Muse Book Award, 2026
- Proclamation of Jared Carter Day, Elwood, Indiana, 2026
- Best Book of Poetry, Indiana Center for the Book, 2007
- Distinguished Hoosier Award, 2005
- Rainmaker Award for Poetry, Zone 3 magazine, 2002
- Poets' Prize, for After the Rain, 1994
- Dictionary of Literary Biography Yearbook Award, 1993
- New Letters Literary Award for Poetry, 1992
- Literature Fellowship, National Endowment for the Arts, 1981, 1991
- Pushcart Prize for Poetry, 1986
- Indiana Governor's Arts Award, 1985
- Writer-in-Residence, Purdue University, 1983, 1986
- Great Lakes Colleges Association New Writers Award for Poetry, 1982
- Fellowship, John Simon Guggenheim Memorial Foundation, 1982
- Margaret Bridgman Fellowship, Bread Loaf Writers' Conference, 1981
- Walt Whitman Award, for Work, for the Night Is Coming, 1980
- Literature Fellowship, Indiana Arts Commission, 1979
- Academy of American Poets Prize, Yale University, 1961

== Poems in Anthologies ==
- The Colosseum Book of Contemporary Verse.
- Twentieth-Century American Poetry.
- Contemporary American Poetry.
- Writing Poems.
- Poetry from Paradise Valley.

== Books ==
- The Land Itself. Morgantown, West Virginia: Monongehela Books, 2019. ISBN 978-1-7330060-1-9
- Darkened Rooms of Summer: New and Selected Poems. Lincoln, Nebraska: University of Nebraska Press, 2014. ISBN 978-0803248571
- A Dance in the Street. Nicholasville, Kentucky: Wind Publications, 2012. ISBN 978-1-936138-27-2
- Cross This Bridge at a Walk. Nicholasville, Kentucky: Wind Publications, 2006. ISBN 1-893239-46-2
- Les Barricades Mystérieuses. Cleveland: Cleveland State University Poetry Center, 1999. ISBN 1-880834-40-5
- After the Rain. Cleveland: Cleveland State University Poetry Center, 1993. ISBN 1-880834-03-0
- Work, for the Night Is Coming. New York: Macmillan, 1981. ISBN 1-880834-20-0

== Chapbooks ==
- Blues Project. Indianapolis: Writers’ Center Press, 1991. ISBN 1-880649-27-6
- Situation Normal. Indianapolis: Writers’ Center Press, 1991.
- The Shriving. Tuscaloosa, Alabama: Duende Press, 1990.
- Millennial Harbinger. Philadelphia: Slash & Burn Press, 1986. ISBN 0-938345-01-X
- Pincushion's Strawberry. Cleveland: Cleveland State University Poetry Center, 1984. ISBN 0-914946-43-9
- Fugue State. Daleville, Indiana: Barnwood Press, 1984. ISBN 0-935306-16-1
- Early Warning. Daleville, Indiana: Barnwood Press, 1979.

== E-books ==
- Time Capsule. E-book no. 26. Dayton, Washington: New Formalist Press, 2007.
- Reading the Tarot: Nine Villanelles. E-book no. 17. Dayton, Washington: New Formalist Press, 2005.

== Sources ==
- Deines, Timothy J."The Gleaning: Regionalism, Form, and Theme in the Poetry of Jared Carter." M.A. thesis, Cleveland State University.
- "Jared Carter." Contemporary Authors . Vol. 145, pp. 75–76. Detroit: Gale Research, 1995.
- Purdy, Gilbert Wesley. The Ties of the Railroad Tracks Home: the Poetry of Jared Carter. Kindle edition, 2014.
- Ponick, T. L., and Ponick, F. S. "Jared Carter." Dictionary of Literary Biography. Vol. 282, pp. 31–40. Detroit: Gale Research, 2003.
- Webb, Jeffrey B. "Watershed Redesign in the Upper Wabash River Drainage Area 1870-1970." Environment, Space, Place 6:1 (spring 2016): 80–86. Zeta Books: Bucharest.
