= Constance Merritt =

American poet

Constance Merritt is an American poet. Born in Pine Bluff, Arkansas, in 1966, and educated at the Arkansas School for the Blind in Little Rock. She is also the winner of the Vassar Miller Prize in Poetry and a finalist for the William Carlos Williams Book Award. In 2001, Merritt received the Rona Jaffe Foundation Writers' Award and a fellowship from the Radcliffe Institute for Advanced Study at Harvard University. From 2003 to 2005, Merritt served as the Margaret Banister Writer-in-Residence at Sweet Briar College. In 2005 she received Arkansas's Porter Prize. Merritt lives in Louisville, Kentucky.

== Education ==
Besides attending the School for the Blind, Constance Merritt attended the University of Utah in Salt Lake City, where she received her B.A and M.A. She then attended the University of Nebraska, in Lincoln, where she received her PhD in creative writing. Also at the University of Louisville, Kentucky; Merritt attended and received her M.S. in social work.

== Volunteer work ==
Constance Merritt, and wife Maria Accardi, started a nonprofit serving people experiencing food insecurity, Bringing Justice Home. Founded in 2020, BJH delivers groceries and household supplies to people who are medically vulnerable and experiencing food insecurity. She currently serves as Executive Director in this organization, which serves to provide food that people actually want and not just need “rejecting the idea that beggars can’t be choosers” (Maria Accardi from WDRB interview). Their goals include creating just relationships, fighting food insecurity, and providing resources to those in need of them.

== Collections of poems ==
Merritt is the author of four collections of poems: Blind Girl Grunt: The Selected Blues Lyrics and Other Poems (Sequim, WA, Headmistress Press, 2017),Two Rooms (Baton Rouge: LSU Press, 2009), Blessings and Inclemencies (Baton Rouge: LSU Press, 2007) and A Protocol for Touch (Denton: UNT Press, 2000).

- Two Rooms: Poems:Louisiana State University Press, 2009
