= Paul Lake (poet) =

American poet

Paul Lake (1951-2022) was an American poet, essayist, and professor at Arkansas Tech University. Another Kind of Travel won the Porter Fund Award for Literary Excellence.

In addition, he won the Richard Wilbur Award for poetry in 2006.

He graduated from Towson University with a B.A. and from Stanford University with an M.A. He had served as the poetry editor for First Things.

== Works ==
- Lake, Paul (1988). Another kind of travel. Chicago: University of Chicago Press. ISBN 0-226-46808-9. OCLC 16004321.
- Lake, Paul (1999). Walking backward : poems. Ashland, OR: Story Line Press. ISBN 1-885266-72-3. OCLC 40901228.
- Lake, Paul (2008). Cry wolf : a political fable. Dallas, Tex.: BenBella Books. ISBN 978-1-933771-42-7. OCLC 182735228.

=== Novel ===
- Lake, Paul (1994). Among the immortals : a novel. Brownsville, OR: Story Line Press. ISBN 0-934257-73-6. OCLC 29955084.

== Awards ==
- Porter Fund Award for Literary Excellence (1988)
- Richard Wilbur Award (2006)
