= Poets' Prize =

The Poets' Prize is awarded annually for the best book of verse published by a living American poet two years prior to the award year. The $3000 annual prize is donated by a committee of about 20 American poets, who each nominate two books and who also serve as judges. The Nicholas Roerich Museum in New York City hosts the annual awards reception in May, which includes readings by the winner and finalists. The founders of the prize were Robert McDowell, Frederick Morgan, and Louis Simpson. The current co-chairs of the prize committee are Robert Archambeau and Marc Vincenz.

== Winners ==
Each year links to its corresponding "[year] in poetry" article:

- 2018—Dana Gioia—99 Poems: New and Selected (Graywolf Press, 2016).
- 2017—Ernest Hilbert—Caligulan (Measure Press, 2015).
- 2016—Erica Dawson—The Small Blades Hurt (Measure Press, 2014).
- 2015—Mary Jo Salter—Nothing by Design (Alfred A. Knopf, 2013).
- 2014—George Green—Lord Byron's Foot (St. Augustine's Press, 2012).
- 2013—Robert B. Shaw—Aromatics (Pinyon Press, 2011); David Wojahn—World Tree (University of Pittsburgh Press, 2011).
- 2012—Ned Balbo— The Trials of Edgar Poe and Other Poems (Story Line Press, 2010).
- 2011—Tony Barnstone—Tongue of War (BkMk Press, 2009).
- 2010—Jane Shore—A Yes-or-No Answer (Houghton Mifflin, 2008).
- 2009—Ellen Bryant Voigt—Messenger: Selected Poems 1976–2006 (Norton, 2007).
- 2008—A. E. Stallings—Hapax (Triquarterly, 2006).
- 2007—Brian Turner—Here, Bullet (Alice James Books, 2005).
- 2006—Catherine Tufariello—Keeping My Name (Texas Tech University Press, 2004).
- 2005—Robert Wrigley—Lives of the Animals (Penguin, 2003).
- 2004—X. J. Kennedy—The Lords of Misrule: Poems 1992–2002 (The Johns Hopkins University Press, 2002).
- 2003—Betty Adcock—Intervale: New and Selected Poems (Louisiana State University Press, 2001).
- 2002—Robert Mezey—Collected Poems, 1952–1999 (University of Arkansas Press, 2001).
- 2001—Philip Booth—Lifelines: Selected Poems 1950–1999 (Viking Penguin, 1999).
- 2000—Wendell Berry—The Selected Poems of Wendell Berry (Counterpoint Press, 1998).
- 1999—Marilyn Nelson—The Fields of Praise: New and Selected Poems (Louisiana State University Press, 1997).
- 1998—Leon Stokesbury—Autumn Rhythm: New and Selected Poems (University of Arkansas Press, 1996); Sydney Lea—To the Bone: New and Selected Poems (Illinois University Press, 1996).
- 1996—Josephine Jacobsen—In the Crevice of Time (Johns Hopkins University, 1995).
- 1995—Marilyn Hacker—Selected Poems 1965–1990 (Norton, 1994).
- 1994—Jared Carter—After the Rain (Cleveland State University Poetry Center, 1993).
- 1993—Maxine Kumin—Looking for Luck (W. W. Norton and Co., 1992)
- 1992—Adrienne Rich—Atlas of the Difficult World (W. W. Norton and Co, 1991); Dana Gioia—The Gods of Winter (Graywolf, 1991).
- 1991—Mark Jarman—The Black Riviera (Wesleyan University Press, 1990); John Haines—New Poems: 1980–88 (Story Line Press, 1990).
- 1990—Miller Williams—Living on the Surface (Louisiana State University, 1989).
- 1989—Andrew Hudgins—After the Lost War: a Narrative (Houghton-Mifflin, 1988).
- 1988—Julia Randall—Moving in Memory (Louisiana State University Press, 1987).

== See also ==
- American poetry
- List of poetry awards
- List of literary awards
- List of years in literature
- List of years in poetry
