= Catherine Tufariello =

American poet (born 1963)

Catherine Tufariello (born 1963 in Ithaca, New York) is an American poet and former professor at Cornell University, the College of Charleston, and the University of Miami.

== Biography ==
She graduated from University at Buffalo, and Cornell University with a PhD.

She taught at Cornell University, the College of Charleston, and the University of Miami. Her work has appeared in The Hudson Review, Poetry, and Yale Italian Poetry (translations).

She lives in Indiana, where she and her husband teach at Valparaiso University, with their daughter.

== Awards ==
- 2006 Poets' Prize
- Booklist Editors' Choice recommendation
- Walt McDonald First Book Poetry Prize
- Los Angeles Times Book Prize Finalist
- Sewanee Writers' Conference, fellowship

== Works ==
- "Bête Noire", Umbrella Journal, Winter 2002
- "SMALL GIRL IN A GIFT SHOP", Valparaiso Poetry Review
- Free Time. Robert L. Barth. 2001.
- Annunciations. Aralia Press. 2001.
- Keeping My Name. Texas Tech University Press. 2004. ISBN 978-0-89672-575-1.

=== Anthologies ===
- Joseph Parisi; Stephen Young, eds. (2002). The POETRY Anthology: 1912-2002. Ivan R. Dee. ISBN 978-1-56663-468-7.
- Jon Stallworthy, ed. (2003). The New Penguin Book of Love Poetry. Penguin Books Ltd. ISBN 978-0-14-101097-7.
- The Zoo Anthology of Younger American Poets. Zoo Press. 2005. ISBN 978-1-932023-02-2.
- William Baer, ed. (2005). 150 Contemporary Sonnets. University of Evansville Press. ISBN 978-0-930982-59-1.
- David Mason; John Frederick Nims; John Frederick Nims, eds. (June 2005). Western Wind: An Introduction to Poetry. McGraw-Hill Companies. ISBN 978-0-07-281959-5.
