= Nat. Brut =

American literary magazine

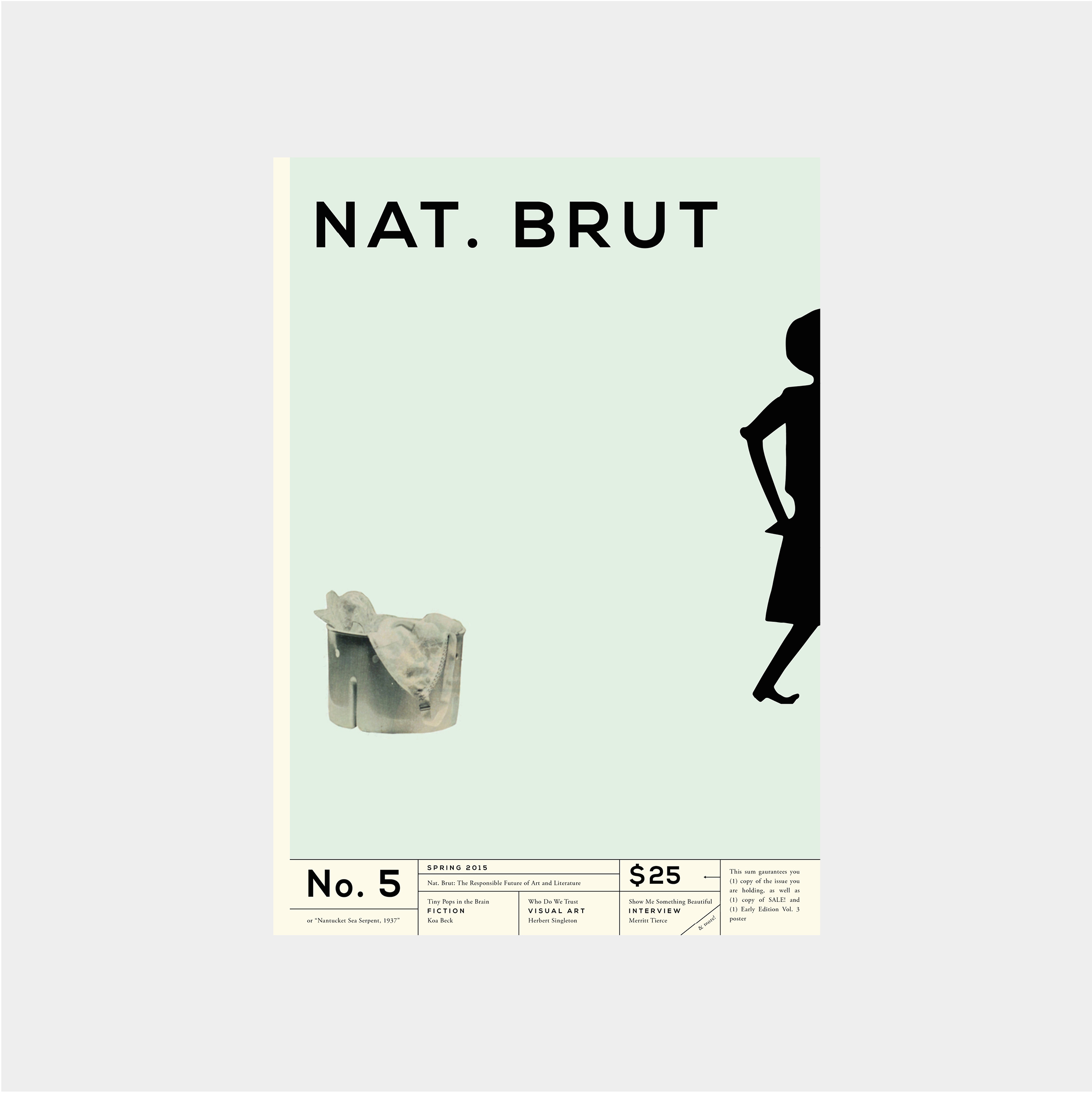
Nat. Brut Issue Five Cover

Nat. Brut is an American literary magazine founded in 2012 by Anna Ploegh and Andrew Ridker. The magazine contains artwork, prose, and poetry by a set of diverse artists and is publicized both online and in print. The most recent issue is Issue 14, which features a folio by incarcerated writers in New Jersey entitled "Inside Voices," as well as poetry, fiction, essay, and visual art.

== History ==
As of 2014, the magazine's current editor-in-chief is a self identified queer Latina by the name of Kayla E. who in addition to her role in Nat. Brut, is a Harvard graduate, designer, artist, and public speaker. Kayla E.'s work has been published in Ecotone magazine, Latina magazine, and on Nat. Brut. When Kayla E. took over as editor-in-chief of Nat. Brut in 2014 she said that "Because of my background (I’m queer, half-Mexican, and come from a working-class background), I can’t help but project my own desires on what a publication should look like and aim for. When I took over... I completely transformed what Nat Brut should look like and [the] types of voices it should highlight".

Issue 1 of Nat. Brut was published in September 2012. The magazine featured Kayla E.'s Work Time as the cover art. There was also poetry by D. A. Powell and the film Document (2012) by Bill Brown (filmmaker), among other contributors. In January 2013, Issue 2 was released, followed by Issue 3 in April 2013. Between August and September 2013, Nat. Brut released Issue 3.5. The issue was a farewell issue by the original editors, who explained that the magazine would produce publications biannually instead of quarterly in an attempt to provide higher quality issues.

Nat. Brut's mission statement is to advance inclusivity in all creative fields by providing an interdisciplinary safe space for marginalized artists.

Nat. Brut is a nonprofit publication sponsored in part by Fractured Atlas. Nat. Brut was a recipient of the Whiting Foundation's Literary Magazine Prize in 2020.

== Publication ==
Nat. Brut offers its content both online and in print, after a successful Kickstarter project to print the magazine in 2014.

As of 2020, Nat. Brut publishes once a year. Each issue contains a folio that highlights writers and artists at a specific intersection of identities, as well as fiction, poetry, nonfiction, interviews, and art. Previous issues included a comics section as supplementary material.

The magazine aims to welcome a broad range of writers from all walks of life, specifically those underrepresented in the existing literary milieu. Part of the magazine's goal is to change the public's perception of literature. Kayla E. told Time Magazine that “Audiences who mainly consume the white, male narratives that dominate these arts seem to have difficulty empathizing with writers and characters whose narratives are different. Focusing on voices and stories that are traditionally pushed to the margins or completely left out of mainstream art and literary culture allows us to address this empathic disparity.”

Its Fall 2015 issue included an interview with artist Jayson Musson.

In 2014 and 2015, Nat. Brut ran a flash fiction contest, judged by Kathleen Hale and Amy Hempel, respectively.

Since 2015, Nat. Brut has published biannual issues as well as a variety of print projects. The magazine transitioned to releasing issues annually in 2020.

== Name ==
Associate editor Tyler Richard stated in an interview with the Harvard Advocate that the magazine's name is "a piece of purposeful nonsense" that nonetheless echoes the Art Brut movement.
