= Naomi Replansky =

American poet (1918–2023)

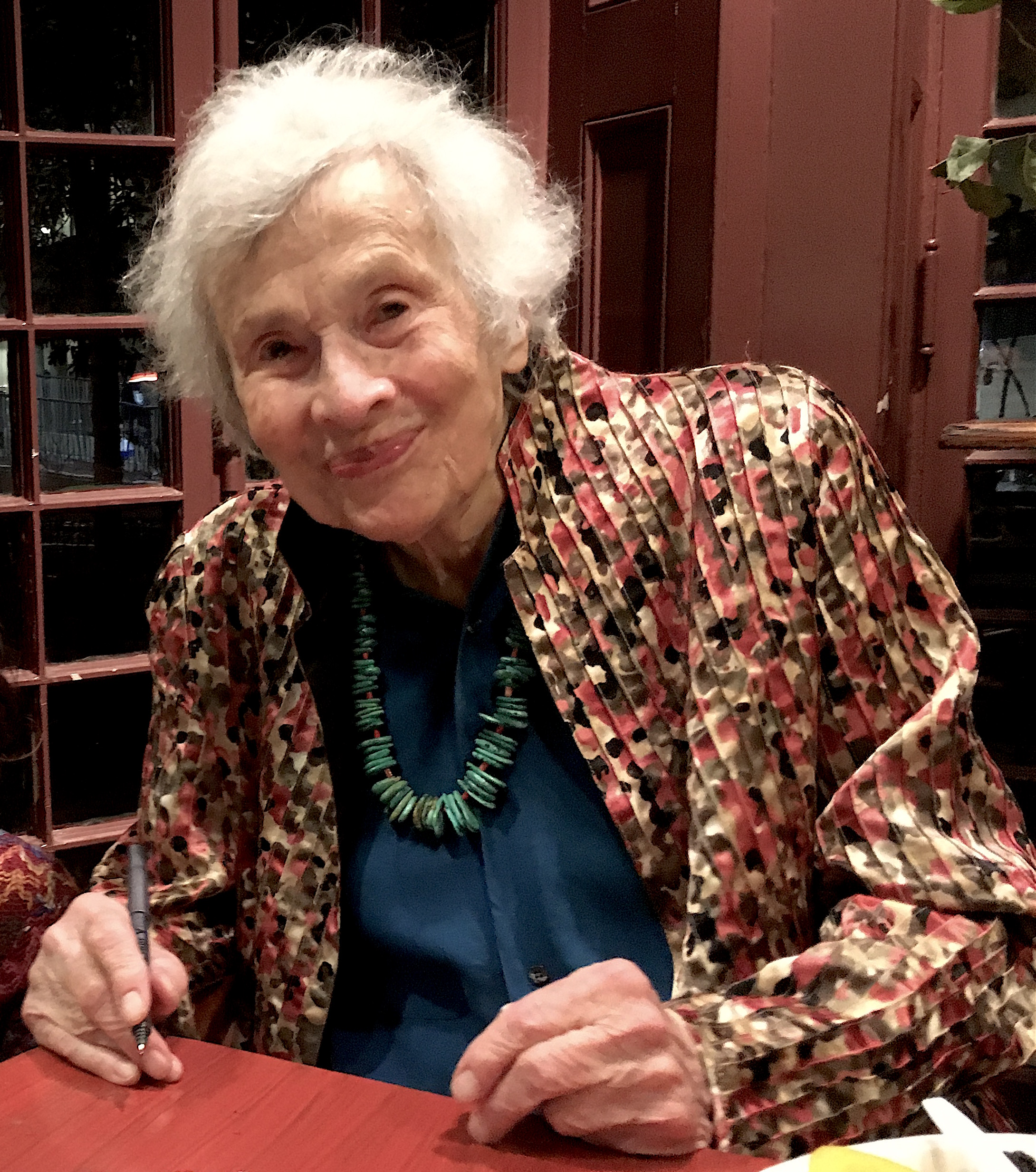
- Replansky at Kelly Writers House in 2016
- Born: May 23, 1918; New York City, U.S.
- Died: January 7, 2023 (aged 104); New York City, U.S.
- Education: University of California, Los Angeles
- Occupation: Poet
- Spouse: Eva Kollisch (m. 2009)

Naomi Replansky (May 23, 1918 – January 7, 2023) was an American poet and translator. The New York Times described her poetry as investigating "social history through individual lives". While her writing initially received little critical attention, she gradually developed a following which grew throughout her life. Collections of her work include Ring Song (1952), The Dangerous World: New and Selected Poems, 1934-1994 (1994), and Collected Poems (2012). Replansky also translated German and Yiddish works into English.

== Background ==
Replansky was born to a family of Russian Jewish immigrants in the Bronx, the daughter of Fannie (Ginsberg) and Sol Replansky, and graduated from James Monroe High School. She enrolled at Hunter College but did not graduate, instead dropping out to look for work. In the 1950s, she attended the University of California, Los Angeles, where she earned a bachelor's degree in geography. Replansky lived in Los Angeles and San Francisco for much of her adult life. Attempts to move to Paris in the 1950s were unsuccessful, as her passport was revoked during that time, apparently in reaction to her left-wing political beliefs.

== Work ==
Replansky spent many years earning a living outside of poetry, working a number of service and technical jobs throughout her life. However, she later became an instructor of poetry at Pitzer College, and also taught the subject at the Henry Street Settlement. Her Collected Poems won the Poetry Society of America's 2013 William Carlos Williams Award and was a finalist for the 2014 Poets' Prize. Replansky's poems have appeared in many literary journals and anthologies, such as No More Masks!, Blood to Remember: American Poets on the Holocaust, Inventions of Farewell: A Book of Elegies, and Poets of the Non-Existent City: Los Angeles in the McCarthy Era. Her four books of poetry are:

- Ring Song (Scribners 1952)
- Twenty-One Poems, Old and New (Gingko Press 1988)
- The Dangerous World: New and Selected Poems, 1934-1994 (Another Chicago Press 1994)
- Collected Poems (Black Sparrow Press/Godine 2012)

"My chief poetic influences," Replansky stated, "have been William Blake, folk songs, Shakespeare, George Herbert, Emily Dickinson and Japanese poetry."

Ring Song, containing poems written from 1936 to 1952, was a finalist for the 1953 National Book Award. Of the following hiatus in publication, she says, "I write slowly." The chapbook Twenty-One Poems contains versions of work contained in the other two collections. The Dangerous World contains forty-two new poems as well as twenty-five revised poems from Ring Song. The meticulousness of her work indicates a painstaking mind and an unusual degree of perfectionism in the craftsmanship of her poems. Though often small in scale, they are giant in meaning. Her Collected Poems include many unpublished works.

== Reception ==
Margalit Fox of The New York Times described Replansky's poetry as "keenly celebrated yet curiously unheralded" for decades, suggesting that her spare style and reliance on rhyme was unfashionable to many poets and critics during the mid-20th century. However, as the years progressed, her writing was praised by David Ignatow, Marie Ponsot, Grace Paley, and Ursula K. Le Guin. George Oppen wrote of her in 1981: "Naomi Replansky must be counted among the most brilliant American poets. That she has not received adequate praise is one of the major mysteries of the world of poetry." Booklist said of The Dangerous World, "with timeless grace, she sets each poem simmering with powerful phrasing and universal experience.... Replansky brings us ageless work in a collection that should not be missed."

Replansky's work was the subject of a lengthy article in the Los Angeles Review of Books, which cites United States Poet Laureate Philip Levine, "who once characterized Replansky as 'an intensely political poet, appalled by the cruelty, greed, and corruption of the masters of nations and corporations, appalled and enraged.' Nevertheless, she mostly eschews the role of protest poet, opting instead to dramatize the intense vulnerability of individual human subjects in a verse style that is both delicate and tough-minded.... One lives with Replansky's poems instead of simply reading or hearing them, because they speak, with intensity and concision, to essential human concerns: the longing to belong and the concomitant ache of exclusion; rage against injustice; awareness of one's own vulnerabilities, particularly those that come with aging; and the profound joy at experiencing true fellowship with others or communion with oneself." "

She was also known for her translations from Yiddish and from the German of Hugo von Hofmannsthal and Bertolt Brecht; Brecht's "Der Sumpf," set by composer Hanns Eisler as one of five "Hollywood Elegies," was long known only in her version ("The Swamp") until the original resurfaced among Peter Lorre's papers and was published in the 1997 Frankfurt edition. Her translation of Brecht's play, "St. Joan of the Stockyards" was performed off-Broadway by the Encounter Theater Company.

A documentary film Naomi Replansky at 100 by Megan Rossman, won several honors. An oil on linen portrait of Replansky by the artist Joseph Solman is in the permanent collection of the Hirshhorn Museum and Sculpture Garden at the Smithsonian Institution in Washington, D.C.

== Personal life ==
Replansky turned 100 in May 2018 and lived another four years, giving her last public reading on December 10, 2022, less than a month before her death. In her later years, she lived on the Upper West Side of Manhattan with her Vienna-born wife, Eva Kollisch, an author and professor of comparative literature and women's studies at Sarah Lawrence College. Kollisch was rescued from the Nazis on a 1939 Kindertransport to the United Kingdom, eventually arriving in the United States in 1940.

Together since the 1980s, Replansky and Kollisch married in 2009. Replansky died at home on January 7, 2023, at the age of 104. Kollisch died in October of that year.
