= 1989 in poetry =

Nationality words link to articles with information on the nation's poetry or literature (for instance, Irish or France).

== Events ==
- April 15–June 4 – 1989 Tiananmen Square protests and massacre in Beijing (China): Poets are active in the events (see Collection of June Fourth Poems).
- June 2 – Dead Poets Society, a film incorporating excerpts from many traditional poets, ending with the title and opening line of Walt Whitman's lament on the death of Abraham Lincoln, "O Captain! My Captain!", is released in the United States
- November 10 – My Left Foot, a film about Christy Brown, the Irish poet, and based on his autobiography, is released

== Works published in English ==
Listed by nation where the work was first published and again by the poet's native land, if different; substantially revised works listed separately:

=== Australia ===
- Robert Adamson The Clean Dark
- Les Murray, The Idyll Wheel
- Philip Salom: Barbecue of the Primitives. (University of Queensland) ISBN 978-0-7022-2221-4
- Chris Wallace-Crabbe (Sangue e l'acqua, translated and edited into Italian by Giovann Distefano, Abano Terme: Piovan Editore

=== Canada ===
- Margaret Avison, No Time (winner of the Governor General's Award for English language poetry in 1990
- C. Bayard, The New Poetics in Canada and Quebec (scholarship)
- Roo Borson, Intent, or, The Weight of the World, ISBN 0-7710-1588-7 American-Canadian
- Tim Lilburn, Tourist To Ecstasy, a finalist for the Governor General's Award, Canada
- Michael Ondaatje, The Cinnamon Peeler: Selected Poems, Canadian poet published in the United Kingdom; London: Pan; New York: Knopf, 1991
- Michael Ondaatje and Linda Spalding, editors, The Brick Anthology, illustrated by David Bolduc, Toronto: Coach House Press

=== India, in English ===
- Nissim Ezekiel, Collected Poems ( Poetry in English ), Delhi, Oxford University Press
- Jayanta Mahapatra, Temple ( Poetry in English ), Sydney: Dangaroo Press
- Imtiaz Dharker, Purdah (Poetry in English), Oxford University Press, Delhi

=== Ireland ===
- Sebastian Barry, Fanny Hawke Goes to the Mainland Forever
- Dermot Bolger, Leinster Street Ghosts
- Eavan Boland, Selected Poems, including "Listen. This is the Noise of Myth" and "Fond Memory", Carcanet Press
- Ciaran Carson, Belfast Confetti, including "The Mouth" and "Hamlet", Oldcastle: The Gallery Press, ISBN 978-1-85235-042-0
- Eiléan Ní Chuilleanáin: The Magdalene Sermon, shortlisted for the Irish Times/Aer Lingus Award, Oldcastle: The Gallery Press, Ireland
- Denis Devlin, Collected Poems, including "Ank'hor Vat", "Little Elegy", "Memoirs of a Turcoman Diplomat: Oteli Asia Palas, Inc.", (see also Collected Poems 1964), Dedalus Press
- Thomas McCarthy, Seven Winters in Paris, Anvil Press, London, Ireland
- John Montague, New Selected Poems, including "Like Dolmens Round My Childhood, the Old People", "The Trout", "A Chosen Light", The Same Gesture", "Last Journey", "Dowager" and "Herbert Street Revisited", Oldcastle: The Gallery Press
- Matthew Sweeney, Blue Shoes, including "to the Building Trade", and "Tube Ride to Martha's"

=== United Kingdom ===
- Dannie Abse, White Coat, Purple Coat
- Fleur Adcock (New Zealand poet who moved to England in 1963), translator, Orient Express: Poems. Grete Tartler, Oxford and New York: Oxford University Press
- Simon Armitage, Zoom!
- Dermot Bolger, Leinster Street Ghosts, Irish poet published in the United Kingdom
- Gillian Clarke, Letting in the Rumour
- Donald Davie, To Scorch or Freeze
- Gavin Ewart, Penultimate Poems
- James Fenton, Manila Envelope, self-published book of poems
- Roy Fuller, Available for Dreams
- Alasdair Gray, Old Negatives
- Gerald Hammond, Fleeting Things: English Poets and Poems, 1616-1660, scholarship
- The Blasphemers' Banquet by Tony Harrison
- Selima Hill, The Accumulation of Small Acts of Kindness
- Ted Hughes, Wolfwatching
- Peter Levi, Shadow and Bone
- George MacBeth, Collected Poems 1958–1982
- E. A. Markham, editor, Hinterland: Caribbean Poetry from the West Indies and Britain
- Grace Nichols:
  - Editor, Poetry Jump-Up, illustrated by Michael Lewis, Penguin (Harmondsworth, England); had been published as Black Poetry in 1988 by Blackie (London, England)
  - Lazy Thoughts of a Lazy Woman, and Other Poems, Virago Press (London, England); published in 1990 by Random House (New York)
- Sean O'Brien, Boundary Beach (Ulsterman Publications)
- Fiona Pitt-Kethley, The Perfect Man
- Peter Porter, Possible Worlds
- Pauline Prior-Pitt, Waiting Women
- J. H. Prynne, Word Order
- Peter Reading, Perduta Gente
- Vernon Scannell, Soldiering On
- Iain Crichton Smith, The Village, and Other Poems
- Charles Tomlinson, Annunciations
- Hugo Williams, Selected Poems, Oxford University Press

=== United States ===
- Joseph Payne Brennan, Look Back On Laurel Hills (Jwindz Publishing/Dwayne H. Olsen)
- Raymond Carver, A New Path To The Waterfall
- Henri Cole, The Zoo Wheel of Knowledge
- Ed Dorn, Abhorrences, Black Sparrow Press
- Rita Dove, Grace Notes
- W. S. Merwin and Soiku Shigematsu, translators, Sun at Midnight, poems by Musō Soseki
- Molly Peacock, Take Heart
- Charles Reznikoff, Poems 1918-1975: The Complete Poems of Charles Reznikoff, edited by Seamus Cooney (Black Sparrow Press)
- Michael Ryan, God Hunger, Viking Penguin
- Mary Jo Salter, Unfinished Painting, Knopf

==== Anthologies in the United States ====
- N. Baym, et al., editors, The Norton Anthology of American Literature, two volumes, third edition
- Eugene England and Dennis Clark, editors, Harvest: Contemporary Mormon Poems, 328 pages. Signature Books, ISBN 978-0-941214-80-3.
- M. Honey, editors, Shadowed Dreams: Women's Poetry of the Harlem Renaissance
- M. Harris and K. Aguero, editors, An Ear to the Ground

===== Poets included in The Best American Poetry 1989 =====
Poems by these 75 poets were included in The Best American Poetry 1989, edited by David Lehman, with Donald Hall, guest editor:

- A. R. Ammons
- John Ashbery
- Beth Bentley
- Elizabeth Bishop
- Robert Bly
- Catherine Bowman
- George Bradley
- David Budbill
- Michael Burkhard
- Amy Clampitt
- Tom Clark
- Clark Coolidge
- Douglas Crase
- Robert Creeley
- Peter Davison
- David Dooley
- Rita Dove
- Stephen Dunn
- Russell Edson
- Daniel Mark Epstein
- Elaine Equi
- Aaron Fogel
- Alice Fulton
- Suzanne Gardinier
- Debora Greger
- Linda Gregg
- Thom Gunn
- Donald Hall
- John Hollander
- Paul Hoover
- Marie Howe
- Andrew Hudgins
- Rodney Jones
- Lawrence Joseph
- Donald Justice
- Vickie Karp
- Jane Kenyon
- Kenneth Koch
- Phillis Levin
- Philip Levine
- Anne MacNaughton
- Harry Mathews
- Robert Mazzacco
- James McCorkle
- Robert McDowell
- Wesley McNair
- James Merrill
- Thylias Moss
- Sharon Olds
- Mary Oliver
- Steve Orlen
- Michael Palmer
- Bob Perelman
- Robert Pinsky
- Anna Rabinowitz
- Mark Rudman
- Yvonne Sapia
- Lynda Schraufnagel
- David Shapiro
- Karl Shapiro
- Charles Simic
- Louis Simpson
- W. D. Snodgrass
- Gary Snyder
- Elizabeth Spires
- David St. John
- William Stafford
- George Starbuck
- Patricia Storace
- Mark Strand
- Eleanor Ross Taylor
- Jean Valentine
- Richard Wilbur
- Alan Williamson
- Jay Wright

==== Criticism, scholarship and biography in the United States ====
- Frederick Feirstein, editor, Expansive Poetry, various essays on the New Formalism and the related movement New Narrative, under the umbrella term "Expansive Poetry"
- Michele Leggott, Reading Zukofsky's 80 Flowers, Baltimore: Johns Hopkins University Press, (New Zealand writer; book published in the United States)
- A. Shucard, Modern American Poetry 1865-1950
- M. Davidson, The San Francisco Renaissance
- W. Kalaidjian, Languages of Liberation: The Social Text in Contemporary American Poetry

=== Other in English ===
- Norman Simms, Who's Writing and Why in the South Pacific, scholarship, New Zealand

== Works published in other languages ==
Listed by nation where the work was first published and again by the poet's native land, if different; substantially revised works listed separately:

=== Arabic language ===
- Nizar Qabbani, Syrian;
  - A Match in My Hand
  - Petty Paper Nations
  - No Victor Other Than Love

=== Denmark ===
- Inger Christensen, Denmark:
  - Digt om døden ("Poem on Death")
  - Lys og Græs ("Light and Grass")
- Klaus Høeck, Heptameron, publisher: Gyldendal; Denmark

=== French language ===
- Claude Esteban, Elégie de la mort violente, Flammarion; France
- Abdellatif Laabi, translator, Plus rares sont les roses, translated from the original Arabic of Mahmoud Darwich into French; Paris: Éditions de Minuit
- Jean Royer, Introduction à la poésie québécoise: Les poètes et les œuvres des origines à nos jours, Montréal: BQ; Canada

=== Hungary ===
- György Petri
  - Ami kimaradt
  - Valahol megvan

=== India ===
Listed in alphabetical order by first name:

- Anamika, Samay Ke Shahar Mein, Delhi: Parag Publications; Hindi-language
- Dileep Jhaveri, Pandukavyo ane Itar, Gujarati-language
- Gagan Gill, Ek Din Lautegi Laraki, New Delhi: Rajkamal Prakashan, New Delhi, 1989, Bharatiya Jnanpith; Hindi-language
- Nirendranath Chakravarti, Jongole Ek Unmadini, Kolkata: Ananda Publishers; Bengali-language

=== Poland ===
- Juliusz Erazm Bolek, Prywatne zagrożenie
- Tymoteusz Karpowicz, Rozwiązywanie przestrzeni. Poemat polifoniczny ("Dissolving Space – A Polyphonic Poem")
- Wisława Szymborska: Poezje: Poems, bilingual Polish-English edition

=== Spain ===
- Matilde Camus:
  - Santander en mi sentir ("Santander in my heart")
  - Sin alcanzar la luz ("Without reaching the Light")

=== Other languages ===
- Nujoom Al-Ghanem, Masaa Al-Janah ("Evening of Heaven"), Emirati Arabic
- Christoph Buchwald, general editor, and Rolf Haufs, guest editor, Luchterhand Jahrbuch der Lyrik 1989/90 ("Poetry Yearbook 1989/90"), publisher: Luchterhand Literaturverlag; anthology; West Germany
- Alexander Mezhirov, Russia, Soviet Union:
  - Бормотуха ("Bormotuha")
  - Стихотворения ("Poems")
- Vladimir Vysotsky, Poėzii͡a i proza ("Poems and prose"), Russia songwriter and poet, Soviet Union
- Yu Jian, Shi liushi shou, China

== Awards and honors ==
=== Australia ===
- C. J. Dennis Prize for Poetry: Gwen Harwood, Bone Scan
- Kenneth Slessor Prize for Poetry: John Tranter, Under Berlin
- Mary Gilmore Prize: Alex Skovron, The Re-arrangement

=== Canada ===
- Gerald Lampert Award: Sarah Klassen, Journey to Yalta
- Archibald Lampman Award: Patrick White, Habitable Planets
- 1989 Governor General's Awards: Heather Spears, The Word for Sand (English); Pierre DesRuisseaux, Monème (French)
- Pat Lowther Award: Heather Spears, The Word for Sand
- Prix Alain-Grandbois: Jean Royer, Poèmes d'amour
- Dorothy Livesay Poetry Prize: Charles Lillard, Circling North
- Prix Émile-Nelligan: Élise Turcotte, La Terre est ici

=== New Zealand ===
- Jenny Bornholdt, Moving House
- Lauris Edmond, Hot October, autobiography
- Kendrick Smithyman, Selected Poems, edited by Peter Simpson, Auckland: Auckland University Press, New Zealand

=== United Kingdom ===
- Cholmondeley Award: Peter Didsbury, Douglas Dunn, E. J. Scovell
- Eric Gregory Award: Gerard Woodward, David Morley, Katrina Porteous, Paul Henry
- Queen's Gold Medal for Poetry: Allen Curnow

=== United States ===
- Agnes Lynch Starrett Poetry Prize: Nancy Vieira Couto, The Face in the Water
- Aiken Taylor Award for Modern American Poetry: Anthony Hecht
- AML Award for poetry Susan Elizabeth Howe for "Things in the Night Sky"
- Bernard F. Connors Prize for Poetry: Jorie Graham, "Spring"
- Frost Medal: Gwendolyn Brooks
- Lannan Literary Award for Poetry: Cid Corman, George Evans and Peter Levitt
- Pulitzer Prize for Poetry: Richard Wilbur: New and Collected Poems
- Rhysling Award:
  - Bruce Boston, In the Darkened Hours (Long form, tie)
  - John M. Ford, Winter Solstice, Camelot Station (Long Form, tie)
  - Robert Frazier, Salinity (Short Form)
- Ruth Lilly Poetry Prize: Mona Van Duyn
- Whiting Awards: Russell Edson, Mary Karr, C.D. Wright
- William Carlos Williams Award: Diane Wakoski, Emerald Ice: Selected Poems 1962-1987
- Fellowship of the Academy of American Poets: Richard Howard

== Births ==
- March 9 – Chen Chen, Chinese-born American poet
- June 19 – Chris Tse, Canadian spoken word poet and hip hop artist
- June 21 – Jackie Hill Perry, born Jackie Hill, American poet and hip hop artist
- Matt Abbott, English poet and performer

== Deaths ==
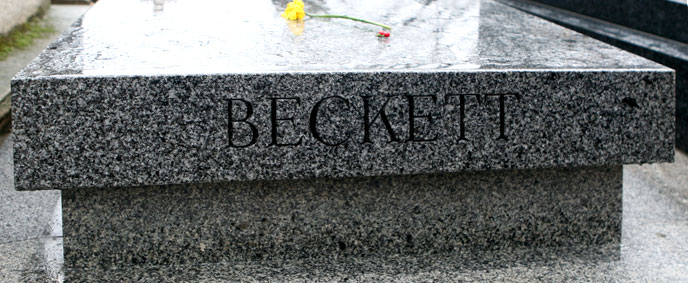
Tombstone of Samuel Beckett

Birth years link to the corresponding "[year] in poetry" article:

- January 4 – Srikrishna Alanahalli, 41 (born 1947), Indian Kannada-language novelist and poet
- January 13 – Sterling Allen Brown, 87 (born 1901), African-American poet, teacher and writer on folklore and of literary criticism
- January 17 – Georges Schehadé, 83 (born 1905), Lebanese poet and playwright
- January 23 – M. Govindan, 69 (born 1919), Indian, Malayalam-language poet
- January 28 – Halina Konopacka, 89 (born 1900), Polish-born poet and discus thrower
- February 28 – Richard Armour, 82, American poet and writer, of Parkinson's disease
- May 14 – Bhupi Sherchan, 53 (born 1935) Nepali poet
- June 19 – Betti Alver, 82 (born 1906), Estonian poet
- August 25 – Hans Børli, 70, Norwegian poet, novelist, and writer
- September 15 – Robert Penn Warren (born 1905), poet and writer, former U.S. Poet Laureate, of cancer
- October 12 – N. V. Krishna Warrier, 78 (born 1911), Indian, Malayalam-language poet, critic and scholar, introduced new types of long narrative poems and satires, editor of weekly Mathrubhumi, director of Kerala Bhasa Institute
- October 24 – Doris Huestis Speirs (born 1894), Canadian painter, ornithologist and poet
- December 4 – May Swenson, American poet and playwright
- December 22 – Samuel Beckett, Irish poet, playwright and novelist, winner of the Nobel Prize in 1969

== See also ==
- Poetry
- List of years in poetry
- List of poetry awards
