= The Best American Poetry 1989 =

The Best American Poetry 1989 book cover

The Best American Poetry 1989, a volume in The Best American Poetry series, was edited by David Lehman and by guest editor Donald Hall.

One of the poems Hall selected for this edition was written by his wife, Jane Kenyon. Hall also selected one of his own poems as one of the 75 best American poems of the year.

== Poets and poems included ==
Poet	Poem	Where poem previously appeared
A. R. Ammons	"Anxiety's Prosody"	Poetry
John Ashbery	"Meanwhile..."	Mudfish
Beth Bentley	"Northern Idylls"	The Gettysburg Review
Elizabeth Bishop	"It is marvellous..."	American Poetry Review
Robert Bly	"My Father at 85"	Common Ground
Catherine Bowman	"Twins of Gazelle Which; Feed Among the Lilies"	The Paris Review
George Bradley	"Of the Knowledge of God and Evil"	The New Yorker
David Budbill	"What I Heard at the Discount; Department Store"	Longhouse
Michael Burkhard	"Hotel Tropicana"	Epoch
Amy Clampitt	"A Minor Tremor"	Boulevard
Tom Clark	"For Robert Duncan"	Exquisite Corpse (magazine)
Clark Coolidge	"Paris..."	o•blék
Douglas Crase	"True Solar Holiday"	The Yale Review
Robert Creeley	"Age"	New American Writing
Peter Davison	"Letter from the Poetry Editor"	The New Criterion
David Dooley	"The Reading"	The Volcano Inside
Rita Dove	"The Late Notebooks of Albrecht Durer"	The Gettysburg Review
Stephen Dunn	"Letting the Puma Go"	Poetry
Russell Edson	"The Rabbit Story"	Willow Springs
Daniel Mark Epstein	"The Rivals"	The Paris Review
Elaine Equi	"A Date with Robbe-Grillet"	New American Writing
Aaron Fogel	"BW"	Western Humanities Review
Alice Fulton	"Powers of Congress"	The Atlantic Monthly
Suzanne Gardinier	"Voyage"	Grand Street
Debora Greger	"In Violet"	The Gettysburg Review
Linda Gregg	"A Dark Thing Inside the Day"	American Poetry Review
Thom Gunn	"Cafeteria in Boston"	The Times Literary Supplement
Donald Hall	"History"	The New Yorker
John Hollander	"Kinneret"	Harp Lake
Paul Hoover	"Twenty-five (from The Novel)"	New American Writing
Marie Howe	"The Good Reason for Our Forgetting"	Partisan Review
Andrew Hudgins	"Heat Lightning in a Time of Drought"	The Georgia Review
Rodney Jones	"Every Day There Are New Memos"	The Georgia Review
Lawrence Joseph	"An Awful Lot Was Happening"	Poetry
Donald Justice	"Dance Lessons of the Thirties"	The New Criterion
Vickie Karp	"Getting Dressed in the Dark"	The New York Review of Books
Jane Kenyon	"Three Songs at the End of Summer"	Poetry
Kenneth Koch	"Six Hamlets"	One Thousand Avant-Garde Plays
Phillis Levin	"The Ransom"	Grand Street
Philip Levine	"Dog Poem"	The Gettysburg Review
Anne MacNaughton	"Teste Moanial"	Exquisite Corpse
Harry Mathews	"Condo Auction"	The Paris Review
Robert Mazzacco	"Kidnapped"	The New Yorker
James McCorkle	"Showing Us the Fields"	Boulevard
Robert McDowell	"The Fifties"	The Hudson Review
Wesley McNair	"The Abandonment"	The Atlantic Monthly
James Merrill	"A Room at the Heart of Things"	The Inner Room
Thylias Moss	"The Warmth of Hot Chocolate"	Epoch
Sharon Olds	"The Wellspring"	American Poetry Review
Mary Oliver	"Some Questions You Might Ask"	Harvard Magazine
Steve Orlen	"The Bridge of Sighs"	The Atlantic Monthly
Michael Palmer	"Sun"	Sun
Bob Perelman	"Movie"	Captive Audience
Robert Pinsky	"At Pleasure Bay"	Raritan
Anna Rabinowitz	"Sappho Comments on an Exhibition of Expressionist Landscapes"	Sulfur
Mark Rudman	"The Shoebox"	The Paris Review
Yvonne Sapia	"Valetino's Hair"	The Reaper
Lynda Schraufnagel	"Trappings"	Shenandoah
David Shapiro	"The Lost Golf Ball"	House (Blown Apart)
Karl Shapiro	"Tennyson"	The New Yorker
Charles Simic	"The White Room"	Western Humanities Review
Louis Simpson	"The People Next Door"	Poetry
W. D. Snodgrass	"The Memory of Cock Robin Dwarfs W. D."	Michigan Quarterly Review
Gary Snyder	"Building"	Witness
Elizabeth Spires	"Sunday Afternoon at Fulham Palace"	Iowa Review
David St. John	"Broken Gauges"	Green Mountains Review
William Stafford	"Last Day"	The Ohio Review
George Starbuck	"Reading the Facts about Frost in The Norton Anthology"	Poetry
Patricia Storace	"Movie"	The New York Review of Books
Mark Strand	"Reading in Place"	Grand Street
Eleanor Ross Taylor	"Harvest, 1925"	Seneca Review
Jean Valentine	"Trust Me"	Boulevard
Richard Wilbur	"Lying"	New and Collected Poems
Alan Williamson	"The Muse of Distance"	The Muse of Distance
Jay Wright	"Madrid"	The Yale Review

== See also ==
- 1989 in poetry
