= 1990 in poetry =

Nationality words link to articles with information on the nation's poetry or literature (for instance, Irish or France).

== Events ==
- Allen Ginsberg crowned "Majelis King" in Prague on May Day.
- Jason Shinder, an American poet, expands a New York City Y.M.C.A. writing education program nationwide, thereby founding the Y.M.C.A. National Writer's Voice program, one of the country's largest networks of literary-arts centers, with 24 locations by 2008. Writers who teach in the program include poets Adrienne Rich and Galway Kinnell, novelists Michael Cunningham and E. L. Doctorow, and playwright Wendy Wasserstein.

== Works published in English ==
Listed by nation where the work was first published and again by the poet's native land, if different; substantially revised works listed separately:

=== Australia ===
- Jennifer Maiden:
  - Bastille Day, NLA
  - Selected Poems of Jennifer Maiden, Penguin
  - The Winter Baby, Angus & Robertson
- Les Murray, Dog Fox Field Sydney: Angus & Robertson, 1990; Carcanet, 1991 and New York, Farrar, Straus and Giroux, 1993
- Chris Wallace-Crabbe:
  - For Crying Out Loud, Oxford: Oxford University Press
  - Poetry and Belief (scholarship), Hobart: University of Tasmania

=== Canada ===
- Dionne Brand, No Language is Neutral
- George Elliott Clarke, Whylah Falls, Vancouver: Polestar, ISBN 0-919591-57-4 (revised edition, 2000 ISBN 1-896095-50-X)
- A. E. Davidson, Studies on Canadian Literature (scholarship), Canada
- Louis Dudek, Continuation II. Montreal: Véhicule Press.
- George Johnston, Endeared by Dark: The Collected Poems
- A.M. Klein, Complete Poems.Toronto: University of Toronto Press.
- A.M. Klein, Doctor Dwarf and Other Poems for Children. Kingston, ON: Quarry Press.
- Archibald Lampman, Selected Poetry of Archibald Lampman, Michael Gnarowski ed. (Ottawa: Tecumseh). ISBN 978-0-919662-15-5
- James Reaney, Performance Poems.
- Michael Redhill, Impromptu Feats of Balance, Don Mills, Ontario: Wolsak & Wynn
- Ajmer Rode, Poems at my Doorstep, by a Punjabi poet living and published in Canada and writing in English; Vancouver: Caitlin Press, ISBN 0-920576-31-1
- Ricardo Sternberg, Invention of Honey, Montreal: Signal Editions
- Phyllis Webb, Hanging Fire

=== India, in English ===
- Dom Moraes, Serendip ( Poetry in English ) .
- Eunice de Souza, Ways of Belonging: Selected Poems ( Poetry in English ), Edinburgh: Polygon, United Kingdom
- Sudeep Sen, The Lunar Visitations ( Poetry in English ), Indian poet writing in English, published in the United States and India; White Swan Books, New York, 1990; ISBN 1-878122-00-2, (reprinted in 1991, New Delhi: Rupa)

=== Ireland ===
- Eavan Boland, Outside History, including "The Latin Lesson" and "Midnight Flowers", Carcanet Press
- Pat Boran:
  - History and Promise (IUP)
  - The Unwound Clock (Dedalus)
- Ciarán Carson, Belfast Confetti, Bloodaxe, Wake Forest University Press, Irish poet published in the United Kingdom
- Paul Durcan, Daddy, Daddy
- Padraic Fallon, Collected Poems, introduction by Seamus Heaney, Oldcastle: The Gallery Press, ISBN 978-1-85235-052-9 published posthumously
- Seamus Heaney:
  - The Tree Clock, Linen Hall Library
  - New Selected Poems 1966-1987, Faber & Faber
  - The Redress of Poetry, criticism
- Michael D. Higgins, The Betrayal
- Paul Muldoon, Madoc, including "Cauliflowers", Faber and Faber, Irish poet published in the United Kingdom
- Eilean Ni Chuilleanain, The Magdalene Sermon, including "The Informant", Oldcastle: The Gallery Press

=== New Zealand ===
- Allen Curnow, Selected Poems 1940–1989
- Bill Manhire, The Old Man's Example
- Frank McKay, Life of James K. Baxter, Auckland: Oxford University Press; called the "standard biography" of New Zealand's "probably New Zealand's best-known poet"
- Cilla McQueen, Berlin Diary, winner of the 1991 New Zealand Book Award for Poetry

=== United Kingdom ===
- Dannie Abse, Remembrance of Crimes Past
- Eavan Boland, Outside History
- Ciarán Carson: Belfast Confetti, Bloodaxe, Wake Forest University Press, Irish poet published in the United Kingdom
- Cary Archard, editor, Poetry Wales: 25 Years, Seren, an anthology
- Donald Davie, Collected Poems
- Paul Durcan, Daddy, Daddy
- Carol Ann Duffy, The Other Country, Anvil Press Poetry (poetry)
- Padraic Fallon, Collected Poems, introduction by Seamus Heaney, published posthumously
- Elaine Feinstein, City Music, Hutchinson
- Tony Harrison
  - Losing Touch
  - The Trackers of Oxyrhynchus
- Seamus Heaney:
  - The Tree Clock, Linen Hall Library
  - New Selected Poems 1966-1987, Faber & Faber
  - The Redress of Poetry, criticism
- John Heath-Stubbs:
  - The Game of Love and Death
  - Selected Poems
- John Hegley, Glad to Wear Glasses (glad to have ears)
- Adrian Henri, Box, and Other Poems
- Alan Jenkins, Greenheart
- Derek Mahon, The Chinese Restaurant in Portrush: Selected Poems. Gallery Press
- Glyn Maxwell, Tale of the Mayor's Son
- Edwin Morgan, Collected Poems
- Brian Patten, Collected Poems
- Ruth Pitter, Collected Poems, introduction by Elizabeth Jennings
- Peter Redgrove, Dressed as for a Tarot Pack
- Peter Scupham, Watching the Perseids
- R.S. Thomas, Counterpoint
- Hugo Williams, Self-Portrait with a Slide

=== United States ===
- Elizabeth Alexander, The Venus Hottentot
- Maya Angelou, I Shall Not be Moved
- Frank Bidart, In the Western Night: Collected Poems 1965–90 (Farrar, Straus and Giroux)
- Philip Booth, Selves, Viking Penguin
- George F. Butterick and Richard Blevins, editors, Charles Olson and Robert Creeley: The Complete Correspondence, ninth and last volume published this year (first volume published in 1980), Santa Barbara, California, biography and criticism
- Maxine Chernoff, Leap Year Day: New & Selected Poems (Another Chicago Press)
- Alice Fulton, Powers of Congress
- David Graham, Second Wind, Texas Tech University Press
- Roald Hoffmann, Gaps and Verges, University of Central Florida Press
- David Lehman, Operation Memory, Princeton University Press
- Thomas Lux, The Drowned River, Houghton Mifflin
- Jean Marzollo, Pretend You're a Cat
- Mary Oliver, House of Light
- Peter Oresick, Definitions (West End Press) and Working Classics (University of Illinois Press)
- Mark Strand, The Continuous Life, Canadian native living in and published in the United States
- Derek Walcott, Omeros
- Rosmarie Waldrop, Peculiar Motions (Kelsey St. Press)
- Reed Whittemore, The Past, the Future, the Present: Poems Selected and New

=== Anthologies in the United States ===
- Michael James Hutt, editor and translator, Himalayan Voices: An Introduction to Modern Nepali Literature, University of California Press
- Peter H. Lee, editor, Modern Korean Literature, including poetry, University of Hawai'i Press
- Edward Morin, editor, The Red Azalea: Chinese Poetry since the Cultural Revolution, University of Hawai'i Press

==== Poets included in The Best American Poetry 1990 ====
These 75 poets were included in The Best American Poetry 1990, edited by David Lehman with Jorie Graham, guest editor:

- A. R. Ammons
- John Ash
- John Ashbery
- Marvin Bell
- Stephen Berg
- Mei-mei Berssenbrugge
- Hayden Carruth
- Anne Carson
- Raymond Carver
- Amy Clampitt
- Killarney Clary
- Robert Creeley
- Christopher Davis
- Thomas M. Disch
- Norman Dubie
- Aaron Fogel
- James Galvin
- Suzanne Gardinier
- Amy Gerstler
- Linda Gregg
- Thom Gunn
- Donald Hall
- Daniel Halpern
- Robert Hass
- Seamus Heaney
- Anthony Hecht
- Emily Hiestand
- Brenda Hillman
- John Hollander
- Virginia Hooper
- Richard Howard
- Fanny Howe
- Rodney Jones
- Galway Kinnell
- Edward Kleinschmidt
- Yusef Komunyakaa
- Denise Levertov
- Philip Levine
- Thomas Lux
- Nathaniel Mackey
- Kevin Magee
- Thomas McGrath
- Lynne McMahon
- Jane Mead
- James Merrill
- W. S. Merwin
- Jane Miller
- Susan Mitchell
- Paul Monette
- Laura Moriarty
- Thylias Moss
- Melinda Mueller
- Laura Mullen
- Alice Notley
- Michael Palmer
- Robert Pinsky
- Jendi Reiter
- Joan Retallack
- Donald Revell
- Adrienne Rich
- Michael Ryan
- James Schuyler
- Frederick Seidel
- Charles Simic
- Gustaf Sobin
- Elizabeth Spires
- David St. John
- Gerald Stern
- Mark Strand
- James Tate
- Sidney Wade
- Rosanna Warren
- Richard Wilbur
- Eleanor Wilner
- Charles Wright

=== Other in English ===
- Ramabai Espinet, Creation Fire: A CAFRA Anthology of Caribbean Women's Poetry
- Derek Walcott, Omeros, St. Lucia poet living in the United States

== Works published in other languages ==
Listed by nation where the work was first published and again by the poet's native land, if different; substantially revised works listed separately:

=== French language ===
==== Canada, in French ====
- Denise Desautels, Leçons de Venise ("Venice Lessons"), about three sculptures by Michel Goulet, Saint-Lambert: Le Noroît
- Suzanne Jacob, Filandere Cantabile, Paris: Marval

==== France ====
- Abdellatif Laabi, Moroccan author writing in and published in France:
  - Tous les déchirements. Messidor, Paris (épuisé)
  - translator, La Poésie palestinienne contemporaine, an anthology translated from the original Arabic; Paris: Éditions Messidor
  - translator, L'Espace du Noûn, translated in collaboration with Leïla Khatib from the original Arabic of Hassan Hamdane; Paris: Éditions Messidor

=== Hungary ===
- Attila Balogh, Versek ("Poems")
- György Petri, Valami ismeretlen
- Gábor Tompa, Készenlét ("Alertness"), Budapest

=== India ===
Listed in alphabetical order by first name:

- Joy Goswami, Kabita-Songroho, Vol. 1, Kolkata: Ananda Publishers, ISBN 81-7066-205-2 (six reprints by 2001); Bangladeshi-language
- K. Satchidanandan, Kayattam, ("The Ascent"); Malayalam-language
- Vaidehi, pen name of Janaki Srinivasa Murthy, Bindu Bindige, Sagara: Akshara Prakashana; Kannada-language
- Varavara Rao (better known as "VV"), Muktakantam or Muktakantham ("Free Throat"), Vijayawada: Samudram Prachuranalu; Telugu-language
- Yash Sharma, Jo Tere Man Chitt Laggi Ja ("Whatever Touches Your Heart and Souls"), winner of the Sahitya Academy Award; Dogri-language

=== Poland ===
- Stanisław Barańczak:
  - 159 wiersze 1968-88 ("159 Poems"), Kraków: Znak
  - Tablica z Macondo. Osiemnascie prob wytlumaczenia, po co i dlaczego sie pisze ("A License Plate from Macondo: Eighteen Attempts at Explaining Why One Writes"), criticism; London: Aneks
- Zbigniew Herbert, Elegia na odejście ("Elegy for the Departure"), Paris: Instytut Literacki
- Ewa Lipska, Strefa ograniczonego postoju', ("Limited Standing Zone"); Warsaw: Czytelnik
- Eugeniusz Tkaczyszyn-Dycki, Nenia i inne wiersze
- Jan Twardowski, Tak ludzka, Poznań: Księgarnia św. Wojciech
- Adam Zagajewski:
  - Płótno, Paris: Zeszyty Literackie
  - Płótno, Paris: Zeszyty Literackie

=== Spanish language ===
==== Spain ====
- Matilde Camus, El color de mi cristal ("The colour of my glasses")

=== Other languages ===
- Christoph Buchwald, general editor, and Karl Mickel, guest editor, Jahrbuch der Lyrik 1990/91 ("Poetry Yearbook 1990/91"), publisher: Luchterhand; anthology; Germany
- Mircea Cărtărescu, The Levant (Levantul), Romania
- Luo Fu, Chinese (Taiwan):
  - Nirvana of Angels
  - House of Midnight
- Nuala Ní Dhomhnaill, Pharaoh's Daughter, including "Fear Suaithinseach", "An Bhabog Bhriste", "An Bhean Mhidhilis", and "Ceist na Teangan", Oldcastle: The Gallery Press, Gaelic-language, Ireland
- Maria Luisa Spaziani, Giovanna d'Arco, Italy

== Awards and honors ==
=== Australia ===
- C. J. Dennis Prize for Poetry: Robert Adamson, The Clean Dark
- Kenneth Slessor Prize for Poetry: Robert Adamson, The Clean Dark
- Mary Gilmore Prize: Kristopher Rassemussen – In the Name of the Father

=== Canada ===
- Gerald Lampert Award: Steven Heighton, Stalin's Carnival
- Archibald Lampman Award: Gary Geddes, No Easy Exit
- 1990 Governor General's Awards: Margaret Avison, No Time (English); Jean-Paul Daoust, Les Cendres bleues (French)
- Pat Lowther Award: Patricia Young, The Mad and Beautiful Mothers
- Prix Alain-Grandbois: Juan Garcia, Corps du gloire
- Dorothy Livesay Poetry Prize: Victoria Walker, Suitcase
- Prix Émile-Nelligan: Claude Paré, Chemins de sel

=== India ===
- Poetry Society India National Poetry Competition : Rukmini Bhaya Nair for Kali

=== United Kingdom ===
- Cholmondeley Award : Kingsley Amis, Elaine Feinstein, Michael O'Neill
- Eric Gregory Award : Nicholas Drake, Maggie Hannan, William Park, Jonathan Davidson, Lavinia Greenlaw, Don Paterson, John Wells
- Queen's Gold Medal for Poetry : Sorley Maclean
- National Poetry Competition : Nick Rice for Room Service

=== United States ===
- Agnes Lynch Starrett Poetry Prize: Debra Allbery, Walking Distance
- Aiken Taylor Award for Modern American Poetry: W. S. Merwin
- AML Award for poetry to Loretta Randall Sharp for "Doing It"
- Bernard F. Connors Prize for Poetry: Christopher Logue, "Kings"
- Bobbitt National Prize for Poetry: James Merrill, The Inner Room
- Frost Medal: Denise Levertov / James Laughlin
- National Book Award for Poetry: No prize given
- Poet Laureate Consultant in Poetry to the Library of Congress: Mark Strand
- Pulitzer Prize for Poetry: Charles Simic: The World Doesn't End
- Rhysling Award:
  - Patrick McKinnon, dear spacemen (Long Form)
  - G. Sutton Breiding, Epitaph for Dreams (Short Form)
- Ruth Lilly Poetry Prize: Hayden Carruth
- Whiting Awards: Emily Hiestand, Dennis Nurkse
- Fellowship of the Academy of American Poets: William Meredith

== Births ==
- March 29 – Kiran Millwood Hargrave, English poet, playwright and novelist

== Deaths ==
Birth years link to the corresponding "[year] in poetry" article:

- January 8 – Jaime Gil de Biedma (born 1929), Spanish poet
- January 25 – Dámaso Alonso (born 1898), Spanish poet
- March 13 – Teiko Tomita (born 1894), Japanese-born American poet who wrote in Japanese
- May 14 – Mary Oppen, 82 (born 1908), American poet, activist, artist, photographer and writer, wife of George Oppen
- September 5 – Frances Chung (born 1950), Chinese American poet
- October 12 – Nagai Tatsuo 永井龍男, used the pen-name of "Tomonkyo" for his poetry (born 1904), Japanese, Shōwa-period novelist, short-story writer, haiku poet, editor and journalist
- November 7 – Lawrence Durrell, 78 (born 1912), English novelist, poet, dramatist and travel writer
- November 11 – Yiannis Ritsos (born 1909), Greek
- Also:
  - Nikos Karouzos (born 1926), Greek
  - John Ormond (born 1923), Welsh poet and journalist

== See also ==
- Poetry
- List of years in poetry
- List of poetry awards
