= Lannan Literary Awards =

American awards and fellowships

The Lannan Literary Awards are a series of awards and literary fellowships given out in various fields by the Lannan Foundation in the United States. Established in 1989, the awards are meant "to honor both established and emerging writers whose work is of exceptional quality", according to the foundation. The foundation's awards are lucrative relative to most awards in literature: the 2006 awards for poetry, fiction and nonfiction each came with $150,000, making them among the richest literary prizes in the world.

The awards reflect the philosophy governing the Lannan Foundation, a family foundation established by financier and art patron J. Patrick Lannan Sr. in 1960. It describes itself as "dedicated to cultural freedom, diversity and creativity through projects which support exceptional contemporary artists and writers, as well as inspired Native activists in rural indigenous communities."

Awards have been made to acclaimed and varied literary figures such as David Foster Wallace, William Gaddis, Lydia Davis, William H. Gass, Steve Erickson and W. S. Merwin. The foundation has also recognized people known as much for their public intellectual activities as for their literary talents, such as Barbara Ehrenreich and Edward Said.

The foundation also gives a "Cultural Freedom Prize" for the stated purpose of recognizing "people whose extraordinary and courageous work celebrates the human right to freedom of imagination, inquiry, and expression." Prize winners include Claudia Andujar, Helen Caldicott, Julián Cardona, Elouise P. Cobell, Mahmoud Darwish, Roxanne Dunbar-Ortiz, Robert Fisk, Eduardo Galeano, Arundhati Roy, Bryan Stevenson and Cornel West.

The foundation does not accept applications for awards or fellowships. Candidates are suggested anonymously "by a network of writers, literary scholars, publishers, and editors," with the foundation's literary committee making the final determination.

The foundation also "provides financial assistance to tribes and nonprofits that serve Native American communities..." For instance, it gave more than $7 million in grants to the Blackfeet Reservation Development Fund from 1998 to 2009, to support litigation on behalf of Native Americans with interests in trust lands. This nonprofit was created by Elouise P. Cobell and her legal team to bring claims against the United States for mismanaging lands held in trust for Native Americans. The Cobell v. Salazar case was filed in 1996 and settled in 2009.

== Lannan Literary Award for Poetry ==
- 1989: Peter Levitt
- 1989: George Evans
- 1989: Cid Corman
- 1990: Seamus Heaney
- 1990: Derek Mahon
- 1991: Pattiann Rogers
- 1991: William Bronk
- 1991: Chrystos
- 1991: William Bronk
- 1992: Luis J. Rodriguez
- 1992: Susan Mitchell
- 1992: Suzanne Gardinier
- 1992: Killarney Clary
- 1992: Thomas Centolella
- 1992: A. R. Ammons
- 1993: Benjamin Alire Sáenz
- 1993: Denise Levertov
- 1993: Cyrus Cassells
- 1994: Richard Kenney
- 1994: Jack Gilbert
- 1994: Linda Hogan
- 1994: Eavan Boland
- 1994: Simon Armitage
- 1995: Li-Young Lee
- 1995: Arthur Sze
- 1995: Carol Ann Duffy
- 1995: Hayden Carruth
- 1996: Donald Justice
- 1996: William Trevor
- 1996: Lucille Clifton
- 1996: Anne Carson
- 1997: Ken Smith
- 1998: Mary Oliver
- 1998: Jon Davis
- 1998: Frank Bidart
- 1999: Louise Glück
- 1999: C. D. Wright
- 1999: Dennis O'Driscoll
- 2000: Jay Wright
- 2000: Herbert Morris
- 2002: Peter Dale Scott
- 2002: Alan Dugan
- 2004: Peter Reading
- 2005: Pattiann Rogers
- 2006: Bruce Weigl
- 2008: August Kleinzahler
- 2012: Dennis O'Driscoll
- 2014: Claudia Rankine
- 2015: A. Van Jordan
- 2016: Tyehimba Jess
- 2017: Shane McCrae
- 2019: Evie Shockley
- 2020: Carolyn Forché

== Lannan Literary Award for Fiction ==
- 1989: John Berger
- 1990: John Hawkes
- 1991: John Edgar Wideman
- 1991: Alexander Theroux
- 1991: Sandra Cisneros
- 1992: Gilbert Sorrentino
- 1992: Frank Chin
- 1993: Paul West
- 1993: Carole Maso
- 1993: Denis Johnson
- 1993: Rikki Ducornet
- 1994: Stephen Wright
- 1994: Caryl Phillips
- 1994: Steven Millhauser
- 1994: Edward P. Jones
- 1995: Alice Munro
- 1995: Mary Morrissy
- 1995: Louis de Bernières
- 1996: David Foster Wallace
- 1996: Tim Pears
- 1996: Howard Norman
- 1997: Grace Paley
- 1997: Anne Michaels
- 1997: John Banville
- 1998: Lois-Ann Yamanaka
- 1998: Stuart Dybek
- 1998: Lydia Davis
- 1998: J. M. Coetzee
- 1999: Joanna Scott
- 1999: Richard Powers
- 1999: Jamaica Kincaid
- 1999: Gish Jen
- 2000: Leslie Marmon Silko
- 2000: Cynthia Ozick
- 2000: David Malouf
- 2000: Robert Coover
- 2003: John McGahern
- 2003: Alistair MacLeod
- 2003: Edward P. Jones
- 2004: Rikki Ducornet
- 2006: Kathryn Davis
- 2007: Susan Straight
- 2007: A. L. Kennedy
- 2016: John Keene
- 2016: Kevin Barry
- 2021: Deborah Levy
- 2021: Rabih Alameddine

== Lannan Literary Award for Nonfiction ==
- 1989: Wendell Berry
- 1990: Barry Lopez
- 1991: Christopher Hitchens
- 1992: Noam Chomsky
- 1993: Terry Tempest Williams
- 1993: Edward Hoagland
- 1994: Jonathan Kozol
- 1995: Richard K. Nelson
- 1995: Scott Russell Sanders
- 1996: Charles Bowden
- 1996: David Abram
- 1997: David Quammen
- 1998: Howard Zinn
- 1998: Lawrence Weschler
- 1998: Chet Raymo
- 1999: Gary Paul Nabhan
- 1999: Jared Diamond
- 2000: Carl Safina
- 2000: Bill McKibben
- 2001: Barbara Ehrenreich
- 2002: Lewis Hyde
- 2002: Wade Davis
- 2003: Rebecca Solnit
- 2004: Luís Alberto Urrea
- 2005: David G. Campbell
- 2005: Adam Hochschild
- 2006: Tim Flannery
- 2007: Mike Davis

== Lannan Literary Award for An Especially Notable Book ==
- 2005: The New American Militarism: How Americans are Seduced by War, by Andrew J. Bacevich
- 2008: Democracy Incorporated: Managed Democracy and the Specter of Inverted Totalitarianism, by Sheldon Wolin
- 2008: Living with Darwin: Evolution, Design, and the Future of Faith, by Philip Kitcher
- 2008: Black Mass: Apocalyptic Religion and the Death of Utopia, by John N. Gray
- 2014: Goliath: Life and Loathing in Greater Israel, by Max Blumenthal
- 2016: From #BlackLivesMatter to Black Liberation, by Keeanga-Yamahtta Taylor
- 2017: Democracy in Chains: The Deep History of the Radical Right's Stealth Plan for America, by Nancy MacLean

== Lannan Literary Fellowship ==
- 1991: Pattiann Rogers
- 1993: William Everson
- 2001: George Saunders
- 2001: Lorrie Moore
- 2001: David Wong Louie
- 2001: Deborah Levy
- 2001: Barbara Ehrenreich
- 2002: Rubén Martínez
- 2002: Lewis Hyde
- 2002: David James Duncan
- 2002: Ahdaf Soueif
- 2002: Naomi Shihab Nye
- 2002: James Alan McPherson
- 2002: James Galvin
- 2002: Ann Cummins
- 2003: Mary Rakow
- 2003: Chris Offutt
- 2003: Linda Gregg
- 2003: George Evans
- 2003: Deborah Eisenberg
- 2003: Chris Abani
- 2004: Rebecca Seiferle
- 2004: Micheline Aharonian Marcom
- 2004: Mavis Gallant
- 2004: Thomas Frank
- 2004: Edwidge Danticat
- 2005: Freeman House
- 2005: Judy Budnitz
- 2005: Nadeem Aslam
- 2006: Frank X Walker
- 2006: Brian Turner
- 2006: Peter Orner
- 2006: Charles C. Mann
- 2006: Elizabeth Kolbert
- 2006: Chris Hedges
- 2007: Jeremy Scahill
- 2007: Sinéad Morrissey
- 2007: Dinaw Mengestu
- 2007: Edie Meidav
- 2007: Daniel Alarcón
- 2007: Paula Gunn Allen
- 2008: Glenn Patterson
- 2008: Ilya Kaminsky
- 2008: Katie Ford
- 2008: Charles D'Ambrosio
- 2009: Valzhyna Mort
- 2009: Sarah Lindsay
- 2010: Michael McGriff
- 2010: C. E. Morgan
- 2011: Atsuro Riley
- 2011: Sherwin Bitsui
- 2012: Kate Moses
- 2012: Natalie Diaz
- 2013: Andrew N. Rubin
- 2014: Jill McDonough
- 2014: Jamaal May
- 2014: Adrian Matejka
- 2014: Mitchell S. Jackson
- 2015: Layli Long Soldier
- 2015: Mark Nowak
- 2015: Philip Metres
- 2015: Sara Baume
- 2016: Ocean Vuong
- 2016: Solmaz Sharif
- 2016: Craig Santos Perez
- 2016: Don Mee Choi
- 2018: Doireann Ní Ghríofa
- 2018: Jacob Shores-Argüello
- 2018: Claire Vaye Watkins
- 2019: Nick Estes
- 2019: Caitriona Lally
- 2019: Wayétu Moore
- 2020: Hanif Abdurraqib
- 2020: Rigoberto González
- 2020: Isabella Hammad
- 2020: Nguyễn Phan Quế Mai
- 2020: Novuyo Rosa Tshuma
- 2021: Afia Atakora
- 2021: Cameron Awkward-Rich
- 2021: Eduardo C. Corral
- 2021: Kirstin Valdez Quade

== Lannan Lifetime Achievement Award ==
- 1989: Kay Boyle
- 1993: William Gaddis
- 1996: R. S. Thomas
- 1997: William H. Gass
- 1998: John Barth
- 1999: Adrienne Rich
- 2000: Evan S. Connell
- 2001: Edward Said
- 2001: Robert Creeley
- 2002: Peter Matthiessen
- 2002: John Berger
- 2004: W. S. Merwin
- 2006: Gilbert Sorrentino
- 2007: Anne Stevenson
- 2014: Joseph Stroud
- 2014: Steve Erickson
- 2018: John Edgar Wideman
- 2021: Yusef Komunyakaa
- 2024: Toi Derricotte
- 2024: Cornelius Eady

== See also ==
- American literature
- American poetry
- List of poetry awards
- List of literary awards
- List of years in poetry
- List of years in literature
