= 1905 in poetry =

This article covers 1905 in poetry. Nationality words link to articles with information on the nation's poetry or literature (for instance, Irish or France).

== Events ==
- March – Art student Vachel Lindsay goes into the streets of New York City and tries to sell or give away copies of one of his poems. The take: 13 cents. His reaction: Ecstasy. "Now let there be here recorded my conclusions from one evening, one hour of peddling poetry. I am so rejoiced over it and so uplifted I am going to do it many times. It sets the heart trembling with happiness. The people like poetry as well as the scholars, or better."
- December 15 – The Pushkin House is established in Saint Petersburg, Russia, to preserve the cultural heritage of Alexander Pushkin.
- Ezra Pound presents H.D. (Hilda Doolittle), fellow American poet, with a sheaf of love poems with the collective title Hilda's Book.

== Works published in English ==
=== Canada ===
- Wilfred Campbell, The Collected Poems of Wilfred Campbell
- James Capon, Roberts and the Influences of His Time, critical work on Charles G. D. Roberts
- Isabella Valancy Crawford, The Collected Poems of Isabella Valancy Crawford, John W. Garvin ed., posthumously published
- William Henry Drummond, The Voyageur and other Poems
- Arthur Wentworth Hamilton Eaton:
  - Acadian Ballads, and De Soto's Last Dream
  - Poems of the Christian Year
- Duncan Campbell Scott, New World Lyrics and Ballads, including "The Forsaken", Canada

=== United Kingdom ===
- Edmund Clerihew Bentley, Biography for Beginners with the first publication of the clerihew
- Robert Bridges, Demeter
- Joseph Campbell, The Garden of Bees
- W. H. Davies, The Soul's Destroyer, and Other Poems
- Ernest Dowson, The Poems of Ernest Dowson
- R. C. Dutt, editor, Indian Poetry: Selected and Rendered Into English, London: J.M. Dent and Co., 163 pages; anthology; Indian poetry in English, published in the United Kingdom
- Violet Jacob, Verses, Scottish poet
- Frederic Manning, The Vigil of Brunhild, verse drama based on Norse mythology
- Sarojini Naidu, The Golden Threshold
- Algernon Charles Swinburne, The Poems of Algernon Charles Swinburne
- Arthur Symons, A Book of Twenty Songs
- Katharine Tynan, Innocencies
- Oscar Wilde, "De Profundis" (posthumous)

=== United States ===
- Madison Cawein, Vale of Tempe
- Paul Laurence Dunbar, Lyrics of Sunshine and Shadow
- Trumbull Stickney, Poems
- John Hall Wheelock, with Van Wyck Brooks, Verses by Two Undergraduates

=== Other in English ===
- R. C. Dutt, editor, Indian Poetry: Selected and Rendered Into English, London: J.M. Dent and Co., 163 pages; anthology; Indian poetry in English, published in the United Kingdom
- Francis Jammes, Tristesses, France
- Sarojini Naidu, The Golden Threshold, Indian poet writing in English, published in Britain (text available online)
- Violet Teague - Night Fall in the Ti-Tree, Australian Artist's book containing poetry

== Works published in other languages ==
=== Indian subcontinent ===
Including all of the British colonies that later became India, Pakistan, Bangladesh, Sri Lanka and Nepal. Listed alphabetically by first name, regardless of surname:

- Ardoshir Faramji Kharbardar, Vilasika (Indian Parsi writing in Gujarati)
- Brij Raj, Vagdevi, Indian, Dogri-Pahadi Brij Bhasha
- Kavi Dalpatram Nanalal, ' 'Vasantotsav' ', Gujarati language, India

=== Other languages ===
- Paul Claudel, France
  - Poèmes de la Sexagésime
  - "Vers d'Exil", poems published in L'Ermitage magazine
- Gjergj Fishta, Lahuta e Malcís ("The Highland Lute"), begins publication, Albania
- Rainer Maria Rilke, The Book of Hours (Das Stunden-Buch), Germany
- Octavian Goga - Poezii

== Births ==
Death years link to the corresponding "[year] in poetry" article:

- January 3 – Padraic Fallon (died 1974), Irish
- January 6 – Idris Davies (died 1956), Welsh poet writing first in that language, later in English
- January 10 – R. A. K. Mason (died 1971), New Zealander
- February 15 (February 2 O.S.) – Musa Cälil (executed 1944), Soviet Tatar poet and resistance fighter
- March 2 – Geoffrey Grigson (died 1985), American
- March 9:
  - Peter Quennell (died 1993), English
  - Rex Warner (died 1986), Irish
- March 13 – Brian Howard (suicide 1958), English poet, writer and "bright young thing"
- March 18 – Alfred Bailey (died 1997), Canadian poet, anthropologist, ethno-historian and academic administrator
- March 21 – Phyllis McGinley (died 1978), American
- April 10 – Norma Davis (died 1945), Australian
- April 17 – Carlos Oquendo de Amat (died 1936), Peruvian poet, author of 5 Meters of Poems (1927)
- April 22 – Robert Choquette (died 1991) Canadian novelist, poet and diplomat
- April 24 – Robert Penn Warren (died 1989), American poet, critic, novelist and academic
- May 15 – Annadashankar Roy (died 2002), Bengali poet
- May 20 – Gerrit Achterberg (died 1962), Dutch poet
- June 8 – Brian Coffey (died 1995), Irish poet and publisher
- June 25 – Jun'ichi Yoda 与田凖 (died 1997), Japanese Shōwa period poet and children's book author
- July 29 – Stanley Kunitz (died 2006), American poet
- August 28 – Len Fox (died 2004), Australian writer, social activist and painter
- November 2 – Georges Schehadé (died 1989), Lebanese poet and playwright
- November 4
  - Xavier Abril (died 1990), Peruvian poet and critic
  - Dragutin Tadijanović (died 2007), Croatian poet
- November 10 – Kurt Eggers (killed in action 1943), German writer, poet, songwriter and playwright
- November 13 – Mary Elizabeth Frye (died 2004), American housewife, florist, author of the poem "Do not stand at my grave and weep"
- December 22 – Kenneth Rexroth (died 1982), American poet
- December 31 – Frank Marshall Davis (died 1987), American poet
- Also:
  - Winifred Maitland Shaw, Australian
  - Ibrahim Touqan إبراهيم طوقان (died 1941), Palestinian, Arab-language

== Deaths ==
- July 1 – John Hay, 66 (born 1838), American statesman, diplomat, author, poet, journalist and private secretary and assistant to Abraham Lincoln
- September 18 – George MacDonald, 80 (born 1824), Scottish-born author, poet and Christian minister known mostly for his fantasy stories
- October 13 – Violet Fane (Mary, Baroness Currie, née Mary Montgomerie Lamb), 62 (born 1843), English
- October 28 – Alphonse Allais, 51 (died 1905), French humorist
- December 29 – Victor Daley, 47 (born 1858), Irish-born Australian

== See also ==
- 20th century in poetry
- 20th century in literature
- List of years in poetry
- List of years in literature
- French literature of the 20th century
- Silver Age of Russian Poetry
- Young Poland (Młoda Polska) a modernist period in Polish arts and literature, roughly from 1890 to 1918
- Poetry
