= Katie Ford =

Katie Ford may refer to:

- Katie Ford (poet)
- Katie Ford (CEO)
- Katie Ford (screenwriter)

== See also ==
- Catherine Ford (disambiguation)
