= Hinterland: Caribbean Poetry from the West Indies and Britain =

Hinterland: Caribbean Poetry from the West Indies and Britain is a 1989 poetry anthology edited by E. A. Markham.

The anthology contributed to the enlarging of the concept of Caribbean literature to include West Indian voices in Britain.

It includes selections from fourteen poets with photos, interviews, and essays. It has been an Open University set text and included in the syllabus at universities and colleges in Britain and the West Indies.

In a long introductory essay Markham writes: "I wanted in this to identify and celebrate a broad range of aesthetic experience — those verbal, intellectual and musical constructs that both trap and release aspects of our particular history, geography, racial and social tension [...]".

== Poets included in Hinterland ==
- Louise Bennett
- Martin Carter
- Derek Walcott
- Edward Kamau Brathwaite
- Dennis Scott
- Mervyn Morris
- James Berry
- E. A. Markham
- Olive Senior
- Lorna Goodison
- Linton Kwesi Johnson
- Michael Smith
- Grace Nichols
- Fred D'Aguiar

== See also ==
- 1989 in poetry
- 1989 in literature
- 20th century in literature
- 20th century in poetry
- Caribbean poetry
- English poetry
- List of poetry anthologies
