= Budbill =

Budbill is a surname. Notable people with the surname include:

- David Budbill (1940–2016), American author
- Tiger Budbill, contestant in season 1 of the US series The X Factor
