= György Petri =

Hungarian poet (1943–2000)

- Born: 22 December 1943; Budapest
- Died: 16 July 2000 (aged 56); Budapest
- Spouse(s): Sára Kepes, Maya, Mari Papp
- Writing career
- Genre: Poetry
- Notable awards: József Atilla Prize (1990); Kossuth Prize (1996); Lenau Prize (1997)

György Petri (22 December 1943 – 16 July 2000) was a Hungarian poet.

== Childhood and youth ==
He was born in 1943 to a multi-ethnic family in Budapest. After his father's death, he was raised by his mother, grandparents and aunts. According to his remembrance, he turned to poetry at 11 or 12, and from the early 1960s he published in such renowned periodicals as Kortárs and Élet és Irodalom. Disillusioned by their style himself, he never let any of those writings be re-issued, and soon he developed the intention to change career. During the following years he nursed at a mental clinic as a preliminary exercise for planned psychiatry studies, resigning from which he showed interest in economics and law, but later he decided to be a philosopher. He informally attended philosophy classes at Eötvös Loránd University, Budapest. In 1966, he finally enrolled at Eötvös Loránd University with a Philosophy and Literature major, without ever graduating. His most inspiring professors were György Márkus, Endre Simon and György Lukács.

== Life under the Soviet regime ==
Under the influence of Lukács, he claimed to be an Austromarxist, which strongly opposed the official doctrine of the time. After 1975, his works were banned as politically unacceptable. Until 1988, his works appeared only in samizdat. During that period he made a living as a freelance translator of poetry and drama, most notably that of Molière. The first official collection of his poems was printed in 1991 by Szépirodalmi Könyvkiadó.

== Political activity ==
Between 1981 and 1985 he co-edited Beszélő, the illegal paper of the Democratic Opposition, and became involved in their anti-regime activities; he was a member of SZETA (Fund for the Support of the Poor, an illegal NGO that drew governmental attention by advocating the mere existence of poverty) from which a liberal party, SZDSZ was formed in 1988. During the 1994 elections, SZDSZ nominated him for MP, but in the same year he had to express his disgust at the party's collaboration with its old enemies, the Socialists, by quitting the party. He never appeared in the political scene again.

== Life in the Third Republic ==
He was one of the editors of Holmi, a literary periodical from 1989, the year of its foundation, to his death in 2000. By receiving the Kossuth Prize in 1996 along with Péter Esterházy, he once again became subject to political criticism for alleged disrespect to Christianity.

== Death and afterward ==
From his early youth, Petri suffered from serious nicotine dependency and alcoholism. In 1998, he was diagnosed with cancer at an incurable stage, and he died two years later. After his death, Petri's oeuvre was re-issued in a four-volume collection by Magvető Publishing House under revision by poet Szabolcs Várady, one of his closest friends.

== Works ==
Each year links to its corresponding "[year] in poetry" page:

- 1971: Magyarázatok M. számára
- 1974: Körülírt zuhanás
- 1981: Örökhétfő
- 1985: Azt hiszik
- 1989: Valahol megvan
- 1989: Ami kimaradt
- 1990: Valami ismeretlen
- 1992: Sár
- 1999: Amíg lehet

== Sources ==
- Géza Fodor: Petri György költészete. Budapest : Szépirodalmi Könyvkiadó, 1991. ISBN 978-963-15-4370-4
- Tibor Keresztury: Petri György. Bratislava : Kalligram, 1997. ISBN 978-80-7149-188-0
