= Backbone: A Journal of Women's Literature =

- Editor: Lauren Fortune
- Contributors: Lynda Schraufnagel, Jo Cochran, Barbara Wilson, Vickie Sears, Paula Gunn Allen, Ursula K. Le Guin, Beverly Silva, and Aisha Eshe
- Categories: Feminist, Poetry, Art, Essays
- Frequency: semi-annual
- First issue: 1984
- Final issue: 1988
- Country: USA
- Based in: Seattle, Washington
- Language: English
- ISSN: 0888-6520

Backbone: A Journal of Women's Literature was an American feminist periodical published in Seattle, Washington from 1984 to 1988.

Originating from the Seal Press's "Backbone Series," which published works by Northwest Women, Backbone became an independent semi-annual magazine with its first issue in 1984. It primarily sought to promote works by women writers from different cultural, social, and economic backgrounds. They published poetry, stories and essays to augment the feminist movement of the 1980s.

In its first issue, the Backbone Collective stated their primary goal with the magazine:

We wish to provide a literary forum for women who otherwise find it difficult to publish their work, not because their work isn't of quality, but because of circumstances such as geographical isolation, color of skin, and class and educational background. (Issue #1, pg.9)

Backbone ceased publication with issue #5 in 1988.
