= Ann Cummins =

American fiction writer

Ann Cummins is an American fiction writer. She was born in Durango, Colorado, and grew up in New Mexico. She is a graduate of writing programs at Johns Hopkins University and the University of Arizona. She is the author of a short story collection, Red Ant House (2003), and a novel, Yellowcake (Houghton Mifflin, 2007). Cummins lives in Flagstaff, Arizona, where she teaches creative writing at Northern Arizona University, and in Oakland, California, with her husband, the musician S. E. Willis.

Yellowcake is about two families, Irish-catholic and Navajo, that are struggling with the laws of uranium mining.

In 2002 Cummins was a recipient of a Lannan Foundation Literary Fellowship.
