= Peter Douthit =

American poet and communalist (1936–2012)

Peter Douthit (October 8, 1936 – October 27, 2012), known professionally as Peter Rabbit, was a poet and communalist associated with Taos, New Mexico and Drop City, Colorado.

After getting involved in the arts community in Taos in 1954, Douthit went to Drop City in 1966, one year after its founding, and became one of the more prominent writers associated with the commune. As Peter Rabbit, his "Dropper name," he wrote a retrospective titled Drop City, which has been described as "a mix of factual history, fiction and prose poetry" and "the most substantial work" on the commune. Douthit was credited for bringing a great deal of attention to Drop City, helping to cement its significance but also weakening its community by attracting too many outsiders. After leaving Drop City in 1968, Douthit helped found another commune called Libre. He returned to Taos in the 1980s and cofounded the Taos Poetry Circus with his wife, the poet Anne MacNaughton.

With MacNaughton and a previous wife, Douthit had four children, two of whom predeceased him.
