= Catherine Ford =

Catherine Ford(e) may refer to:

- Catherine Tate, née Ford, English comedian and actress
- Catherine Ford, mother of Ford Grey, 1st Earl of Tankerville
- Catherine Forde, see Manchester Book Award
- Katherine Louise Ford, Socialist candidate in 2000 London Assembly election

== See also ==
- Kate Ford, English actress in Coronation Street
- Katie Ford (disambiguation)
