= Yvonne Sapia =

American poet (born 1946)

Yvonne Veronica Sapia (born 1946) is an American poet. A daughter of Puerto Rican immigrant parents, she was born and raised in New York City.

Sapia studied at Florida Atlantic University in Boca Raton. After working as a newspaper reporter and technical writer, she returned to academia, receiving an MFA in creative writing from the University of Florida in Gainesville. She now teaches at Florida Gateway College.

Sapia's first poetry collection of poetry Fertile Crescent was published in 1983. Her second collection was called Valentino's Hair and won the Samuel French Morse Prize for poetry in 1987. The title poem was also included in The Best American Poetry 1989 anthology.
