= Katie Ford (poet) =

American poet (born 1975)

- Born: April 29, 1975 (age 51); Portland, Oregon, U.S.
- Education: Harvard Divinity School; University of Iowa
- Occupation: Poet
- Writing career
- Subject: Poetry

Katie Ford (born April 29, 1975 in Portland, Oregon) is an American poet, essayist, and professor.

== Life ==
She was born to Mary and Michael Ford. She has two siblings, Kristin and Brian. She began writing at the age of 19, while earning her B.A. in English from Whitman College. Soon after, she earned her Master’s in Divinity from Harvard. Ford went on to pursue her Master’s in Fine Arts (MFA), with a concentration in poetry, from Iowa’s Writers Workshop. Along with her published poetry collections— Deposition, Colosseum, and Storm—her individual poems and essays can be found in many contemporary journals and reviews. Ford is currently a professor at University of California, Riverside.

While a 19-year-old student at Whitman College earning her B.A. in English, Ford began writing poetry. In an interview with Devil’s Lake magazine board member, Nancy Reddy, Ford attributed her growth as a writer to poet, author, and playwright, Tess Gallagher: “In my last year of college, I studied under Tess Gallagher, and that was utterly formative for my ideas about poetry and poetics, especially in terms of lyricism and figuration.”

Ford also credits poet Jorie Graham for inspiration during her studies at Harvard, where she earned a Master’s in Divinity and began work on her first poetry collection, Deposition. She then went on to receive a Master’s in Fine Arts (MFA) from the University of Iowa.

Ford’s individual poems have appeared in many journals and reviews, such as American Literary Review, The New Yorker, The American Poetry Review, The Paris Review, Seneca Review, Ploughshares, Poets & Writers, and Pleiades. She has three published works, including Deposition, Colosseum, and Storm. Her debut collection, Deposition, confronts God, violence, and Christian belief.

Her book Colosseum, which was named “Best Book of 2008” by Publishers Weekly, explores the theme of ruination and pulls from Ford’s personal experiences as a resident of New Orleans when Hurricane Katrina drove thousands out of their homes. The New York Times Book Review stated that Ford’s poetry, “possess[es] the veiled brilliance of stained glass windows seen at night.” With short lyrical poems, Storm continues on the theme of ruination with a focus on the efforts to escape New Orleans in the aftermath of the hurricane.

Ford’s poem, “The Soul,” from her most recent book, Blood Lyrics (Graywolf Press, 2014) was selected for publication by the Public Poetry Project of the Pennsylvania Center for the Book in 2013.

From 2005-2009, Ford served as the poetry editor of the New Orleans Review and taught at Loyola University and Reed College. She taught creative writing and literature in contemporary poetry at Franklin and Marshall College and is now at the Department of Creative Writing in the University of California, Riverside She now lives in South Pasadena with her daughter, Maggie after living in Philadelphia with her ex-husband, novelist Josh Emmons

== Bibliography ==
=== Poetry ===
==== Collections ====
- Ford, Katie (2002). Deposition. Graywolf Press. ISBN 978-1555973742.
- — (2007). Storm. Marick Press.
- — (2008). Colosseum. Saint Paul, Minnesota: Graywolf Press. ISBN 978-1555975012.
  - "Koi". Poets.org. Archived from the original on 2007-10-13.
- — (2014). Blood Lyrics. Graywolf Press. ISBN 978-1555976927.
- — (2018). If You Have to Go: Poems. Graywolf Press. ISBN 978-1555978112.

==== Poems ====
Title	Year	First published	Reprinted/collected in
Colosseum			Ford, Katie (2008). Colosseum. Graywolf Press.; "Colosseum". Poets.org. Archived from the original on 2010-05-20.

- "It's Late Here How Light Is Late Once You've Fallen + Elegy to the Last Breath". Post Road. No. 5. Fall–Winter 2002. Archived from the original on 2004-06-30.
- "Rarely". American Poetry Review. Vol. 37, no. 3. World Poetry, Inc. May–June 2008. p. 7. eISSN 2162-4984. ISSN 0360-3709. JSTOR 20683831. EBSCOhost 31790769. ProQuest 220636177.

=== Essays and reporting ===
- ""Visibility is Poor": Elizabeth Bishop's Obsessive Imagery and Mystical Unsaying". Poets.org. Archived from the original on 2009-05-05.

== Awards ==
- Lannan Foundation Fellowship
- Levis Reading Prize
- grants from the Academy of American Poets and the PEN American Center
