= Beth Bentley =

American poet (1921–2021)

Beth Singer Bentley
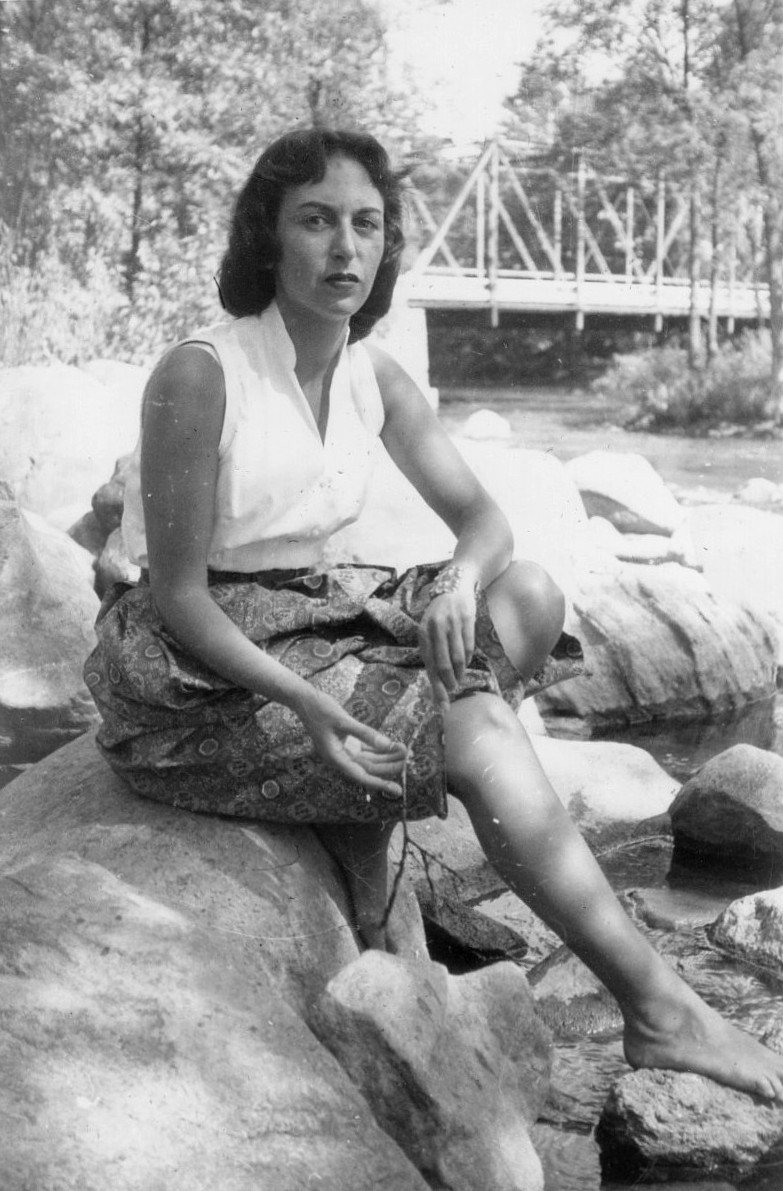
- Bentley in 1949
- Born: October 7, 1921; St. Paul, Minnesota
- Died: February 11, 2021 (aged 99); Mercer Island, Washington
- Education: University of Michigan
- Occupation: Poet
- Spouse: Nelson Bentley

Beth Singer Bentley (October 7, 1921 – February 11, 2021) was an American poet. She was born in St. Paul, Minnesota and received her BA and MFA in creative writing and English from the University of Michigan, where her fiction won the Hopwood Award while still a graduate student. She settled in Seattle and was married to poet Nelson Bentley, a professor at the University of Washington, from 1952 until his death in 1990.

== Life ==
Her poems appeared in a number of magazines and journals including Poetry, The New Yorker, and The Paris Review. She published two full-length collections of poems, both with Ohio University Press: Phone Calls From the Dead in 1970 and Country of Resemblances in 1976. She also published several chapbooks and edited a selection of the poetry of Hazel Hall. Her poem Northern Idylls was included in The Best American Poetry 1989.

Bentley died in February 2021 at her home on Mercer Island the age of 99.

== Selected publications ==
According to her obituary,

Beth's work has been widely published in dozens of journals and anthologies, including The New Yorker, Poetry, The Atlantic, Paris Review, Poetry Northwest, The Nation, Saturday Review, Seattle Review, and Fine Madness. Her collections include: Little Fires (1998); The Purely Visible (1980); Philosophical Investigations (1977); Country of Resemblances (1976); Field of Snow (1973); and Phone Calls from the Dead (1972). Beth also selected and edited The Selected Poems of Hazel Hall (1980).
