= Xavier Abril =

Peruvian poet and essayist

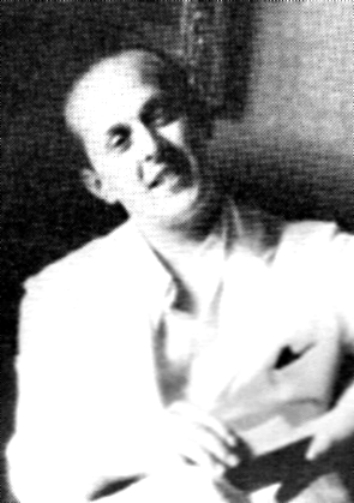
Abril circa 1940

Xavier Abril de Vivero (4 November 1905 in Lima - 1 January 1990 in Montevideo) was a Peruvian poet and essayist who devoted time studying the poetry of César Vallejo.

== Bibliography ==
- Exposition de poèmes et designs, París, 1927
- Various poems (in the magazine Amauta, 1926 - 1930)
- Hollywood (Madrid, 1931)
- Difícil trabajo, (Madrid, 1935)
- Descubrimiento del alba, (Lima, 1937)
- La rosa escrita, (Montevideo, 1987 and Lima, 1996)
- Declaración de nuestros días, (1988),
- Poesía inédita, (Montevideo, 1994).
- Poesía soñada, obra poética completa (Lima, UNMSM, 2006)

=== Essays and anthologies ===
- Anthology of César Vallejo (Buenos Aires, 1943).
- Vallejo: test critical approach (Buenos Aires, 1958).
- Two studies: Vallejo and Mallarmé (Bahia Blanca, 1960).
- César Vallejo or poetic theory (Madrid, 1963).
- Exegesis trílcica (Lima, 1981)
