= Ricardo Sternberg =

Canadian poet (born 1948)

Ricardo da Silveira Lobo Sternberg (born 1948) is a Canadian poet.

Born in Rio de Janeiro, Brazil, Sternberg moved to the United States with his family when he was fifteen. He received a B.A. in English literature from the University of California, Riverside and an M.A. and Ph.D. in Comparative Literature from UCLA. Between 1975 and 1978, he was a Junior Fellow with the Society of Fellows at Harvard University. His poetry has been published in magazines such as The Paris Review, The Nation, Poetry (Chicago), Descant, American Poetry Review, The Virginia Quarterly Review and Ploughshares., He has lived in Toronto, Canada since 1979 teaching Brazilian and Portuguese Literature at the University of Toronto.

He is the author of four books. Blindsight, a CD of his readings, was released in 1998 by Cyclops Press.

== Bibliography ==
- The Invention of Honey. Montreal: Véhicule, 1990.
- Map of Dreams. Montreal: Véhicule, 1996.
- Bamboo Church. Montreal: McGill-Queen's University Press, 1996.
- Some Dance. Montreal: McGill-Queen's University Press, 2014.
- One River: New and Selected Poems. Montreal:Véhicule Press, 2024.

== Discography ==
- Blindsight. Toronto: Cyclops, 1998.
