= Anne MacNaughton =

American poet

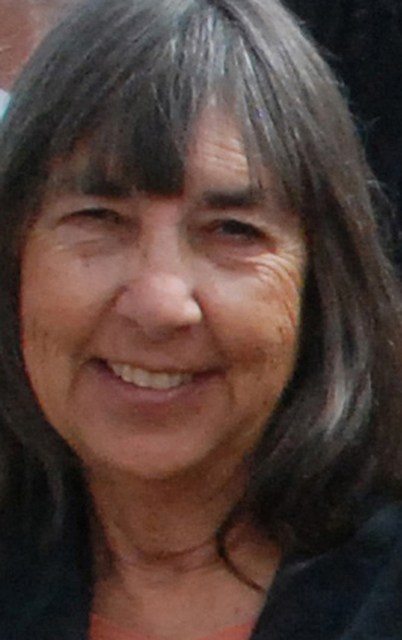
- Education: University of New Mexico (MA)
- Occupations: Poet, professor
- Spouse: Peter Douthit

Anne MacNaughton, also known as Annie MacNaughton, is an American poet.

She received her MA from the University of New Mexico, where she later taught. She and her late husband Peter Douthit (known professionally as Peter Rabbit) founded the Taos Poetry Circus, which became a significant locus of performance poetry until it ceased operations in 2003. Douthit died in 2012.

MacNaughton has continued to foster poetry writing and performance in New Mexico through the Society of the Muse of the Southwest and the Poetry Education Project, both of which she founded, as well as serving on committees evaluating poetry for the New Mexico Department of Cultural Affairs.

MacNaughton is the editor of Taos Poetry Circus: The Nineties, published in 2002. She has also been collected in New Mexico Poetry Renaissance (1994) and The Best American Poetry 1989.
