= Lynda Schraufnagel =

American poet and activist

- Born: October 29, 1950
- Died: January 4, 1991 (aged 40)
- Education: University of Houston

Lynda Jean Schraufnagel (October 29, 1950 – January 4, 1991) was an American poet and activist for feminist and socialist causes. Despite a brief literary career cut short by her early death, she was featured in The Best American Poetry twice and was the subject of a long tribute in verse by her teacher, Richard Howard.

== Life ==
In the 1970s, while waitressing in Seattle, she joined the Freedom Socialist Party and its affiliate Radical Women and worked on the party's official newspaper, The Freedom Socialist, as a proofreader. She also contributed an editorial defending abortion rights and calling feminists' attention to the death of Rosie Jimenez. In the 1980s, Schraufnagel began focusing on poetry, helping to found the feminist magazine Backbone: A Journal of Women's Literature. She then moved to Houston to pursue an M.A. in creative writing at the University of Houston, where she also taught. She graduated in 1987 with a collection of poems, titled "The Lighted Face of the Bar Clock," as her thesis. She was awarded a fellowship at the Fine Arts Work Center in Provincetown for the academic year 1989 to 1990. She died at the age of 40 in 1991.

== Work and recognition ==
Schraufnagel's poems explored the troubled experience of American women with deep sympathy; when her "Carnival" was published in Feminist Studies, the editors described it in their preface as "a forgiving fantasy" of "a mother's oppressive marriage and subsequent abandonment of her children." Her poem "Trappings" was included by editor Donald Hall in The Best American Poetry 1989. At the time of her death she was described as "relatively obscure."

After her death, an outpouring of grief coincided with wider publication and appreciation of her work. Her poem "Trial" was included by Charles Simic in The Best American Poetry 1992, accompanied by a note from Richard Howard, her former teacher at Houston, mourning her "manic glee." In a review of the book, Stephen Margulies singles out her poem as "a trial by funkiness, a vitally weary, broken-neon-sign account of drugs and Vietnam veterans and working at diners and the guilt of refusing guilt, the numb shame of denying mercy." Howard also published a long poem describing her "inordinate life" and fierce radicalism, "To the Tenth Muse," saying that "she would tolerate my classroom in order to show cause / for later parlays"; the poem's final stanzas state: "Merely I observed / in her (and with her / in myself) that our deepest desire aims at transformation." Howard sketches out her life in brief: "the nuns had taught her / to bear the ennui / of almost any routine"; she had been a "bank-teller, waitress"; "she had been married, / yes, but he was a transvestite"; she was "Angular, graceful" and bore "the mask of a scornful dyke." Several other poems and books published in the 1990s were dedicated to her memory, including Nancy Eimers's "In the New Year" and "Space Life" and Cathleen Calbert's Bad Judgment.
