= Killarney Clary =

American poet

Killarney Clary is an American poet who was awarded a 2011 National Endowment for the Arts Fellowship for Poetry. Clary received the Lannan Literary Award for Poetry in 1992.

== Biography ==
Born in 1953 and raised in Pasadena, California, Clary has since been published in numerous publications including: The Boston Review, The Yale Review, American Poetry Review, The Paris Review, and many others. Killarney Clary has published several books of poetry:

- Who Whispered Near Me (1989),
- By Common Salt (1996),
- Potential Stranger (2003),
- Shadow of A Cloud but no Cloud (2014).

Clary attended the University of California, Irvine, where she received degrees in studio art and poetry writing.
