= Emily Hiestand =

American writer and poet (born 1947)

- Born: 1947 (age 77–78); Chicago, Illinois, U.S.
- Occupation: Writer; poet
- Education: Philadelphia College of Art; Boston University
- Notable awards: Whiting Award (1990)

Website
- www.ehiestand.com

Emily Hiestand (born 1947 Chicago) is an American writer and poet.

== Life ==
She grew up in Oak Ridge, Tennessee. She graduated from the Philadelphia College of Art. In 1970, she moved to Boston, where she worked as a graphic designer. She studied at Boston University, with George Starbuck.

She was an editor at Orion magazine and the Atlantic Monthly.

Her work appears in Atlantic Monthly, Boston Globe Magazine, Bostonia, Georgia Review, Hudson Review, Michigan Quarterly Review, New York Times, Orion, Partisan Review, Prairie Schooner, Southeast Review, The Nation, The New Yorker.

== Awards ==
- 1988 National Poetry Series, for Green the Witch Hazel Wood, selected by U.S. Poet Laureate Jorie Graham
- 1988 The Nation/ Discovery Prize
- 1990 Whiting Award

== Works ==
=== Essays ===
- "The Constant Gardener". The Atlantic. March 2007.
- "Real Places". The Atlantic. July–August 2001.
- The Very Rich Hours: Travels in Orkney, Belize, the Everglades and Greece. Beacon Press. 1993. p. 80. ISBN 978-0-8070-7117-5. "Emily Hiestand poet."
- Angela the Upside Down Girl: And Other Domestic Travels. Beacon Press. 1998. ISBN 978-0-8070-7128-1.

=== Poetry ===
- Green the Witch Hazel Wood. Graywolf Press. 1989. ISBN 1-55597-120-2.

=== Anthologies ===
- Robert Finch; John Elder, eds. (2002). "Zip-A-Dee-Do-Dah". Nature writing: the tradition in English. W. W. Norton & Company. p. 959. ISBN 978-0-393-04966-4. "Emily Hiestand poet."
- Jorie Graham; David Lehman, eds. (1990). The best American poetry, 1990. Charles Scribner's Sons. ISBN 978-0-684-19187-4.
- Jim Elledge; Susan Swartwout, eds. (1999). Real things: an anthology of popular culture in American poetry. Indiana University Press. ISBN 978-0-253-33434-3.

== Reviews ==
Emily Hiestand stretches the elastic border "around the place we call home," dissolving boundaries imposed by time and geography as she looks beneath the surface of the familiar.
