= Patricia Storace =

American poet

- Education: Barnard College, University of Cambridge
- Occupation: Professor
- Writing career
- Genre: poetry
- Notable awards: Witter Bynner Poetry Prize

Patricia Storace is an American poet.

She is the 1993 winner of the Witter Bynner Poetry Prize by the American Academy of Arts and Letters and a 1996 recipient of a Whiting Award.

== Life ==
She was raised in Mobile, Alabama, and graduated from Barnard College, and University of Cambridge. She lives in New York City.

Her work has appeared in the AGNI, Harper's, New York Review of Books, Los Angeles Times, The Paris Review, Ploughshares, and the Arvon anthology edited by Ted Hughes and Seamus Heaney.

== Works ==
=== Poetry ===
- "Pamina's Marriage Speech". Agni. 21. 1984.
- Heredity. Beacon Press. 1987. ISBN 978-0-8070-6800-7.

=== Novel ===
- The Book of Heaven. Pantheon Books. 2014. ISBN 978-0-375-40806-9.

=== Memoir ===
- Dinner with Persephone. Pantheon Books. 1996. ISBN 978-0-679-42134-4.

=== Children's ===
- Sugar Cane. Illustrator Raul Colon. Jump at the Sun/Hyperion Books for Children. 2007. ISBN 978-0-7868-0791-8.
