= George Starbuck =

American poet (1931–1996)

- Born: George Edwin Starbuck; June 15, 1931; Columbus, Ohio
- Died: August 15, 1996 (aged 65); Tuscaloosa, Alabama
- Education: Chadwick School; California Institute of Technology; University of California, Berkeley; American Academy in Rome; University of Chicago; Harvard University
- Occupation: Poet
- Writing career
- Genre: Poetry

George Edwin Starbuck (June 15, 1931 in Columbus, Ohio – August 15, 1996 in Tuscaloosa, Alabama) was an American poet of the neo-formalist school.

== Life ==
Starbuck studied at Chadwick School, the California Institute of Technology, the University of California, Berkeley, the American Academy in Rome, the University of Chicago, and Harvard University. He also studied under Robert Lowell in the Boston University workshop with Sylvia Plath and Anne Sexton. He taught at the Iowa Writers Workshop, Boston University, and the State University of New York, Buffalo. He was fired by SUNY-Buffalo for not taking a loyalty oath, but was vindicated by the Supreme Court in 1965. His students included Joshua Clover, Maxine Kumin, Peter Davison, Emily Hiestand, Mary Baine Campbell, Craig Lucas, James Hercules Sutton, Shreela Ray, and Askold Melnyczuk.

Starbuck had five children: Margaret, Stephen, John, Anthony, and Joshua. His papers are held at the University of Alabama library.

Starbuck's work is marked by clever rhymes, witty asides, and the fusing of Romantic themes with cynicism about modern life. For example, his book Bone Thoughts was published with half its pages blank, and he called his style of formalism "SLABS" (Standard Length And Breadth Sonnets). He was not widely appreciated in the mainstream culture during his lifetime, but two collections of his poems published in the early 2000s, The Works: Poems Selected from Five Decades and Visible Ink, helped win him a wider audience. Julie Larios writes of Starbuck, "Often wrongly pigeonholed as a light verse poet, he was a technical master and superb ironist."

Starbuck's best-known poems include "Tuolumne," "On an Urban Battlefield," and "Sonnet With a Different Letter At the End of Every Line."

== Awards ==
- 1993 Aiken Taylor Award for Modern American Poetry
- 1982 Lenore Marshall Poetry Prize, for The Argot Merchant Disaster: Poems New and Selected
- 1960 Yale Series of Younger Poets Competition

== Partial bibliography ==
- The Works: Poems Selected from Five Decades, University of Alabama Press, 2003
- Translations from the English, University of Alabama Press, 2003
- Visible Ink, University of Alabama Press, 2002
- Space Saver Sonnets, Bits Press, 1986
- Richard the Third in a Fourth of a Second, Bits Press, 1986
- The Argot Merchant Disaster: Poems New and Selected, Little, Brown & Co., 1982
- Talkin' B.A. Blues, Pym-Randall Press, 1980
- Desperate Measures, D. R. Godine, August 1978
- Elegy in a Country Churchyard, Pym-Randall Press, September 1975
- White Paper, Little, Brown & Co., 1966
- Bone Thoughts, Yale University Press, 1960

=== Anthologies ===
- Lorrie Goldensohn, ed. (2006). "Of Late". American War Poetry: An Anthology. Columbia University Press. ISBN 978-0-231-13310-4.
