= James Galvin (poet) =

American poet (born 1951)

- Born: 1951 (age 74–75); Chicago, Illinois, U.S.
- Education: Antioch College (BA); University of Iowa (MFA)
- Occupations: Poet; novelist; teacher
- Writing career
- Notable works: Resurrection Update: Collected Poems 1975-1997 (1997); The Meadow

James Galvin (born 1951) is the author of seven volumes of poetry, a memoir, and a novel. He teaches at the Iowa Writers' Workshop in Iowa City, Iowa.

== Biography ==
Galvin was born in Chicago, Illinois, in 1951 and was raised in Northern Colorado. He earned a BA from Antioch College in 1974 and an MFA from the University of Iowa Writers' Workshop in 1977.

After receiving his MFA, Galvin taught at Murray State University in Kentucky for two years and Humboldt State University in California for three years. He later joined the faculty at the prestigious Iowa Writers' Workshop, where he continues to teach each year.

Galvin has published seven poetry collections and a compilation of his work, Resurrection Update: Collected Poems 1975–1997 (Copper Canyon Press, 1997). Galvin has also written a memoir, The Meadow, (Henry Holt, 1992), which recounts the hundred-year history of the ranch he owns on the Colorado–Wyoming border; and the novel Fencing the Sky (Henry Holt, 1999), about the destruction of rangelands and concomitant social changes in the western United States.

Galvin has been the recipient of fellowships from the National Endowment for the Arts, the Ingram Merrill Foundation, and the Guggenheim Foundation.

Galvin divides his time between Iowa City and Wyoming.

== Awards ==
- Lila Wallace-Reader's Digest Foundation Award
- Lannan Literary Award 2002 for X: Poems
- Guggenheim Fellowship
- Ingram Merrill Fellowship
- National Endowment for the Arts Fellowship
- Finalist, the Los Angeles Times Book Award and the Lenore Marshall Poetry Prize for Resurrection Update: Collected Poems 1975-1997

=== Poetry ===
- Everything We Always Knew Was True (Copper Canyon Press, 2016)
- As Is (Copper Canyon Press, 2009)
- X: Poems (Copper Canyon Press, 2003)
- Resurrection Update: Collected Poems 1975-1997 (Copper Canyon Press, 1997)
- Lethal Frequencies (Copper Canyon Press, 1995)
- Elements (Copper Canyon Press, 1988)
- God's Mistress (Harper Collins, 1984)
- Imaginary Timber (Doubleday, 1980)

=== Fiction ===
- The Meadow (Henry Holt, 1992)
- Fencing the Sky (Henry Holt, 1999)
