= Peter Levitt =

Canadian poet (born 1946)

- Born: September 2, 1946 (age 80); New York City, U.S.
- Occupations: Poet; translator
- Spouse: Shirley Graham
- Children: 1
- Website: www.peterlevitt.com

Peter Levitt (born September 2, 1946 in New York City) is a Canadian poet and translator. He is also the founder and teacher of the Salt Spring Zen Circle, in the Soto Zen lineage of Shunryu Suzuki-Roshi.

== Background ==
He has taught poetry, writing and creativity workshops and seminars around the world, including at the C. G. Jung Institute of Los Angeles, Naropa Institute Jack Kerouac School of Disembodied Poetics, and as a faculty member in poetry and translation for the MFA Writers Program at Antioch University, a program he designed with Eloise Klein Healy. He emigrated to Canada in 2000 and became a citizen shortly thereafter. Once there, he taught translation in the University of British Columbia Creative Writing Optional Residency MFA Program. He was in the anthology and film, Poets Against the War. He was at the 2009 Montreal Zen Poetry Festival.

He is the father of a daughter, Sheba, and a son, Tai, and lives with his wife, the poet Shirley Graham on Salt Spring Island in British Columbia.

== Awards ==
- 1989 Lannan Foundation Literary Award in Poetry
- 2004 Canada Council for the Arts

== Work ==
=== Poetry ===
- Yin Mountain: The Immortal Poetry of Three Daoist Women, Translated with Rebecca Nie. Shambhala Publications. 2022.
- Fingerpainting on the Moon: Writing and Creativity as a Path to Freedom. Piquant Press. 2021.
- The Complete Cold Mountain: Poems of the Legendary Hermit Hanshan, Translated with Kazuaki Tanahashi. Shambhala Publications. 2018.
- The Essential Dogen: Writings of the Great Zen Master, Translated with Kazuaki Tanahashi. Shambhala Publications. 2014.
- No Beginning, No End by Jakusho Kwong, edited by Peter Levitt. Shambhala Publications. 2010.
- A Flock of Fools: Ancient Buddhist Tales of Wisdom and Laughter, Translated and Retold with Kazuaki Tanahashi. Grove Atlantic. 2004.
- Within Within. Black Moss Press. 2008.
- Winter Still. Mother Tongue Press. 2007. ISBN 978-0-8308-2308-6.
- Fingerpainting on the Moon: Writing and Creativity as a Path to Freedom. Harmony Books. 2003.
- One Hundred Butterflies. Broken Moon Press. 1993.; Blissful Monkey Press 2011 (Second Edition)
- Bright Root Dark Root. Broken Moon Press. 1992. ISBN 0-913089-20-6.
- Bright Root Dark Root. Ambrosia Press. July 1989. ISBN 0-913089-20-6.
- The Heart of Understanding by Thich Nhat Hanh, edited by Peter Levitt. Parallax Press. 1987.
- Homage: Leda as Virgin. Lockhart Press. 1987.
- A Book of Light. Amargi Press. 1982.
- Running Grass (Poems 1970-1977) Foreword by Robert Creeley. Eidolon Editions. 1979.
- Two Bodies, Dark/Velvet. Momentum Press. 1975.
- Poems. Slow Loris Press. 1972.

=== Essays ===
- Fingerpainting on the Moon:Writing and Creativity as a Path to Freedom. Crown Publishing Group. July 2003. ISBN 978-0-609-61048-0.

=== Editor / Translator ===
- Thich Nhat Hanh (1988). The Heart of Understanding. Parallax Press. ISBN 978-0-938077-11-4.
- Jay Dunitz (January 1993). Pacific Light. Beyond Words Publishing. ISBN 978-0-941831-23-9.
- Jakusho Kwong (March 2003). No Beginning, No End: the Intimate Heart of Zen. Crown Publishing Group. ISBN 978-0-609-61080-0.
- Kazuaki Tanahashi (May 2004). A Flock of Fools: Ancient Buddhist Tales of Wisdom and Laughter. Grove/Atlantic, Inc. ISBN 978-0-8021-4133-0.
- Kazuaki Tanahashi (August 2010) Shobo Genzo: Zen Master Dogen's Treasury of the True Dharma Eye, associate editor, Peter Levitt
- The Essential Dogen: Writings of the Great Zen Master (Shambhala Publications, April 2013) edited by Peter Levitt and Kazuaki Tanahashi
- The Complete Cold Mountain: Poems of the Legendary Hermit Hanshan. (Shambhala Publications, 2018) Translated by Kazuaki Tanahashi and Peter Levitt ISBN 1611804264
- Yin Mountain: The Immortal Poetry of Three Daoist Women, Translated with Rebecca Nie. Shambhala Publications. 2022.
