= Steve Orlen =

American writer (1942–2010)

Steve Orlen (January 13, 1942 – November 16, 2010) was an American poet and professor at the University of Arizona. He was visiting professor at the University of Houston, Goddard College, and Warren Wilson College. Orlen was a co-founder of the Creative Writing Program at the University of Arizona and a 1967 graduate of the Iowa Writers' Workshop.

== Awards ==
- 1999 Guggenheim Fellow
- National Endowment for the Arts fellow.

== Works ==
- Permission to Speak, Wesleyan University Press, 1978, ISBN 978-0-8195-2090-6
- A Place at the Table, Holt, Rinehart, and Winston, 1982
- The Bridge of Sighs, Miami University Press, 1992, ISBN 978-1-881163-00-8
- Kisses, Miami University Press, 1997, ISBN 978-1-881163-20-6
- This Particular Eternity. Ausable Press. 2001. ISBN 978-0-9672668-5-5.
- The Elephant's Child: New & Selected Poems 1978-2005. Ausable Press. 2006. ISBN 978-1-931337-28-1.
- A Thousand Threads, Hollyridge Press, 2009, ISBN 978-0-9843100-2-9 Chapbook

=== Anthologies ===
- Michael Collier; Stanley Plumly, eds. (1999). "The Great Wheel". The new Bread Loaf anthology of contemporary American poetry. UPNE. ISBN 978-0-87451-950-1.
- Ellen Bryant Voigt; Heather McHugh, eds. (2002). "Butterflies That Save Us from Ourselves". Hammer and blaze: a gathering of contemporary American poets. University of Georgia Press. p. 206. ISBN 978-0-8203-2416-6. "steve orlen."
- Paul Muldoon; David Lehman, eds. (2005). "Song: I Love You. Who Are You?". The Best American poetry. Simon and Schuster. ISBN 978-0-7432-5758-9.
