= Phillis Levin =

American poet (born 1954)

- Born: Paterson, New Jersey, U.S.
- Education: Sarah Lawrence College; Johns Hopkins University
- Occupation: Poet
- Spouse: Jack Shanewise (m. 2008)
- Parent(s): Herbert L. Levin; Charlotte E. Levin

Phillis Levin is an American poet.

== Life ==
Levin is the daughter of Charlotte E. Levin and Herbert L. Levin of Yardley, Pennsylvania. She graduated from Sarah Lawrence College in 1976, and Johns Hopkins University in 1977. She was an Associate Professor of English at The University of Maryland, College Park, and is currently a visiting professor in the graduate writing program at New York University and a teaching poet-in-residence at Hofstra University. She is also an elector of the American Poets' Corner of the Cathedral Church of Saint John the Divine, and the co-director of the Sarah Lawrence Language Exchange. She is a member of PEN. Her poems have been published in Poets for Life, Poetry, Ploughshares, AGNI, and The New Yorker.

On May 17, 2008, she married Jack Shanewise, at the Century Association in New York. They live in New York City.

== Awards ==
- 1986 Ingram Merrill Award
- 1988 Norma Farber First Book Award
- 1995 Fulbright Fellowship to Slovenia
- 1999-2000 Amy Lowell Poetry Travelling Scholarship
- 2000 Bogliasco Fellowship
- 2003 Guggenheim Fellowship
- 2006 Richard Hugo Award from Poetry Northwest
- 2007 National Endowment for the Arts Fellowship.

== Works ==
- "Ontological". The New Criterion. 16: 38. October 1997.
- "Cumulus". The New Criterion. 15: 35. January 1997.
- "Georgic". The New Criterion. 17: 39. October 1998.
- "Unsolicited Survey". The Nation. 8 January 2001.
- "A Rhinoceros at the Prague Zoo". Poetry Northwest. October 2006. Archived from the original on 1 May 2009.
- "End of April", Poetry 180, Library of Congress
- "Conversation Between Clouds; May Day; My Brother's Shirt". Reading Between A&B. 5 March 2007.
- "On Time". The New Yorker. 14 May 2007.
- "Album". The Atlantic. October 2007.

=== Books ===
- One Left. Johns Hopkins University. 1977.
- Temples and Fields. Georgia. 1988. ISBN 978-0-8203-3350-2.
- The Afterimage. Copper Beech. 1995. ISBN 978-0-914278-67-2.
- Mercury. Penguin. 2001. ISBN 978-0-14-058928-3.
- May Day. Penguin. 2008. ISBN 978-0-14-311394-2.
- Mr. Memory & Other Poems. Penguin. 2016. ISBN 9780143128113.
- An Anthology of Rain. Barrow Street Press. 2025. ISBN 9781962131063.

=== Editor ===
- The Penguin Book of the Sonnet. Penguin. 2001. ISBN 978-0-14-058929-0.
- 2009 Pushcart Prize XXXIII Best of the Small Presses

=== Translation ===
- Šalamun, Tomaž (2007). "All of You". Parthenon West Review.

=== Anthologies ===
- Alhambra Poetry Calendar 2008 (Alhambra Publishing, 2008)
- Poetry 180: A Turning Back to Poetry (Random House, 2003)
- The Best American Poetry 1998 (Scribner, 1998)
- The Best American Poetry 1989 (Scribner, 1989)
