= Mark Rudman =

American poet (born 1948)

Mark Rudman (born 1948 New York City) is an American poet. He is a former professor at Columbia University and New York University.

He graduated from The New School with a BA, and from Columbia University with an MFA. His work has appeared in Salt magazine, The Nation, and New York Review of Books.

He is married and lives in New York City.

== Awards ==
- The National Book Critics Circle Award in poetry, for Rider
- Max Hayward Award for translation of Pasternak's My Sister, Life
- Ingram Merrill Foundation fellowship
- National Endowment for the Arts fellowship
- 1996 Guggenheim Fellow
- Academy American Poets Prize
- Denver Quarterly Prize
- CCLM Editor's Fellowship

== Works ==
- By contraries and other poems, University of Maine, 1987, ISBN 978-0-915032-93-8
- The nowhere steps, Sheep Meadow Press, 1990, ISBN 978-0-935296-90-7
- Rider. Wesleyan University Press. 1994. ISBN 978-0-8195-1217-8.
- Millennium Hotel. Wesleyan University Press. 1996. ISBN 978-0-8195-2230-6.
- "'The Secretary of Liquor' (John F. Kennedy's Informal Appointment of Dean Martin to His Cabinet)". New England Review. 20 (3): 150–158. 1999. ISSN 1053-1297. JSTOR 40243742.
- Provoked in Venice. Wesleyan University Press. 1999. ISBN 978-0-8195-6354-5.
- The Couple. Wesleyan University Press. 2002. ISBN 978-0-8195-6578-5.
- Sundays on the Phone. Wesleyan University Press. 2005. ISBN 978-0-8195-6785-7.

=== Translations ===
- Boris Pasternak (2001). My Sister-Life. Northwestern University Press. ISBN 978-0-8101-1909-3.

=== Non-fiction ===
- Diverse voices: essays on poets and poetry, Story Line Press, 1993; 2009
- Realm of Unknowing. Wesleyan University Press. 1995. ISBN 978-0-8195-1224-6. "mark rudman."
- Robert Lowell and the Poetic Act (2007)
