= Wesley McNair =

American poet (born 1941)

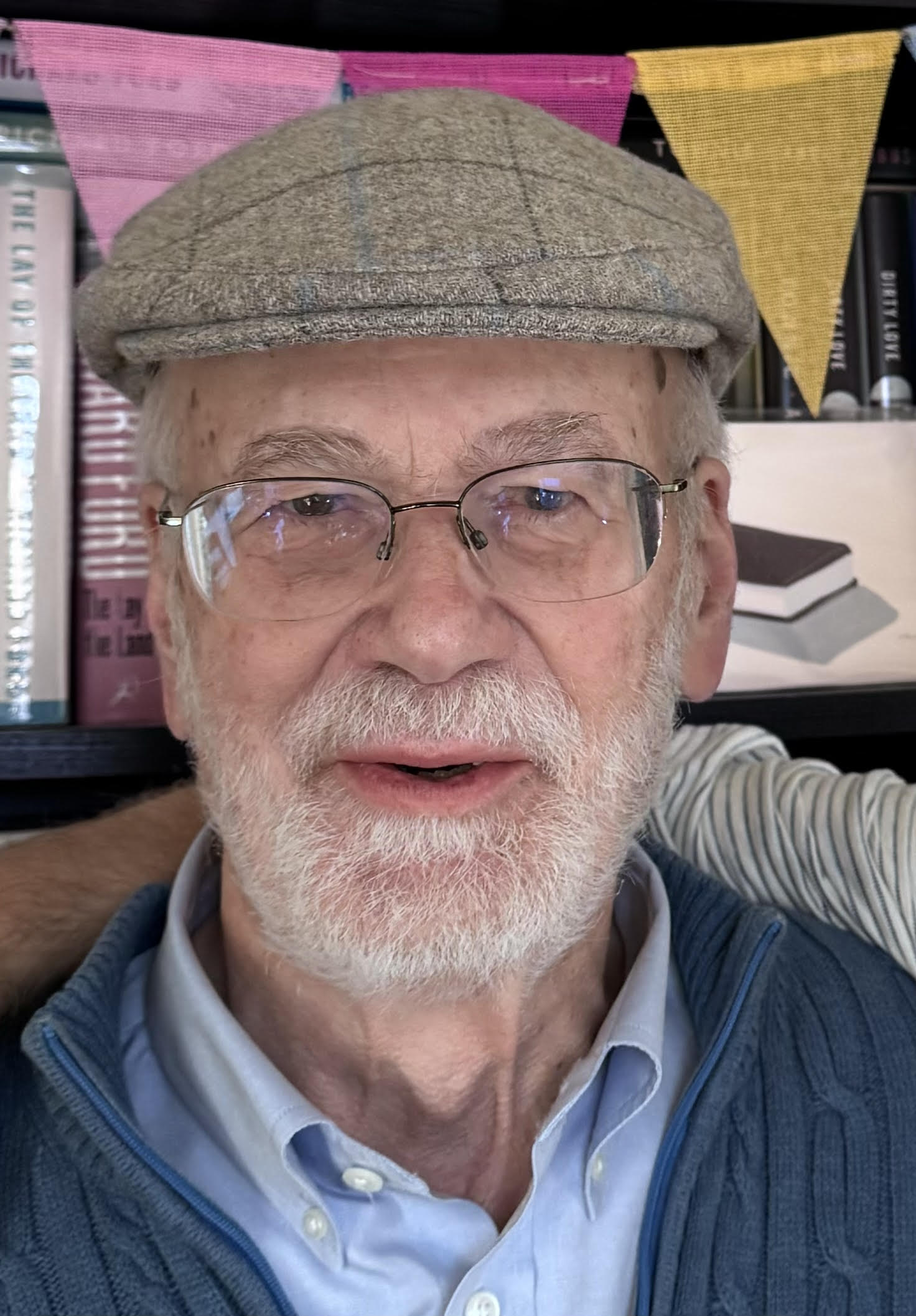
- Born: June 19, 1941 (age 85); New Hampshire
- Known for: Poet
- Website: www.wesleymcnair.com

Wesley McNair (born 19 June 1941) is an American poet, writer, editor, and professor. He has authored eleven volumes of poetry, most recently, Late Wonders: New & Selected Poems (Godine, 2022) and Dwellers in the House of the Lord (Godine, 2019). He has also written three books of prose, including a memoir, The Words I Chose: A Memoir of Family and Poetry (Carnegie Mellon University Press, 2013). In addition, he has edited several anthologies of Maine writing, and served as a guest editor in poetry for the 2010 Pushcart Prize Annual.

A New Hampshire native who has lived for many years in Mercer, Maine, McNair received his undergraduate degree from Keene State College and has earned two degrees from Middlebury College, an MA in English, and an M.Litt. in American literature. He has also studied American literature, art, and history at Dartmouth College, sponsored by a National Endowment for the Humanities Fellowship. As of 2018, McNair is professor emeritus and writer in residence at the University of Maine at Farmington.

== Work ==
According to United States Artists, Wesley McNair's poetry often deals with "the struggles of the economic misfits of his native New England, often with humor and through the use of telling details." In his memoir The Words I Chose, McNair refers to the region of his poetry as "a place of farmers under threat, ethnic shop workers, traders, and misfits at the margins" and his exploration of "their American dreams, failures, self-doubts, and restlessness." He adds to these themes, love and its absence, loss and disability, and the precarious bonds of family and community.

At the center of McNair's poems and his memoir is his family and extended family, whose conflicts recur throughout his several collections, forming a narrative of their own. His literary family, underprivileged and post-industrial, is at odds with those of earlier New England poets. He explains in his essay "Placing Myself" that whereas "a poet like Robert Lowell features a New England family of pedigree connected to the history of high culture...my own poetry family is lower class, consisting of mongrels whose history is largely unknown." He continues: "Where Donald Hall skips a generation to write about his grandfather and the agrarian tradition he represents, I write about a broken family with no real patriarch and no clear tradition."

The struggles of his family poems and others often link with national themes, as in his long narrative poem "My Brother Running," in which he links his younger brother's fatal heart attack, following months of desperate running, with the tragic explosion of NASA's Challenger shuttle. In his recent collection, The Lost Child: Ozark Poems (Godine, 2014), he moves from New England to the Ozarks of southern Missouri, where his mother grew up, though he does not leave behind his earlier concerns about family, community, and America. The core characters of the book, derived from his mother and her siblings, are part of a forgotten American generation who grew up in the poverty and hardship of the Dust Bowl period.

“As I continued with the book, I felt I was in the belly of the American beast, because my materials allowed me to explore American themes I’d been denied as a poet of New England,” McNair says in a 2023 interview published in Rustica. “Maine, after all, is located at the edge of the American map. If you hate your president, you can tell yourself you might move to Canada or Europe. But my Ozark relatives were in the heartland of the country simply making America happen. And there I was alongside, watching them do it.”

In Dwellers in the House of the Lord (Godine, 2020), he writes about rural Virginia, where his sister Aimee struggles with a failing marriage to Mike, the owner of an off-the-grid gun shop. The book-length narrative poem explores his family's immigrant origins and links Aimee's story with the ugly politics of the Trump era.

Late Wonders: New & Selected Poems—McNair's eleventh poetry collection—includes “The Long Dream of Home”, the complete trilogy of McNair's long narrative poems written over the last thirty years: “My Brother Running,” “Fire,” and “Dwellers in the House of the Lord.” “Throughout the trilogy is a growing apprehension that something has gone deeply wrong with the nation’s sense of itself over the past 40 years,” McNair remarks in his Rustica interview. The Los Angeles Review of Books wrote: “At 81, Wesley McNair is writing the best poetry of his life—poetry uniquely capable of, and interested in, addressing our larger moment.” Writing in The National Review, Nick Ripatrazone concluded: “McNair’s poems are just sharp enough to open our eyes anew—and just smooth enough for us to think such wisdom arrived by grace alone. His work is melodic without being singsong; it is both sanguine and realistic.” Foreword Reviews wrote: “Not all poets are storytellers, not even close, but all of them wish they were, wish they had a better understanding of how words and images bind spells.”

McNair's eleven volumes of poetry, inspired by region, American popular culture, and the broad human experience, include a wide range of meditations, lyrics and narratives. As critics and interviewers have remarked, his poems are attuned to the cadences and suggestions of American speech.

== Honors and awards ==
McNair has received two Rockefeller Fellowships for creative work at the Bellagio Center in Italy, two National Endowment for the Arts Fellowships, and a Guggenheim Fellowship. Among his other honors are the Theodore Roethke Prize, The Jane Kenyon Award for Outstanding Book of Poetry, the Devins Award for Poetry, the Eunice Tietjens Prize from Poetry magazine, and the Sarah Josepha Hale Medal for his "distinguished contribution to the world of letters." McNair has served five times on the jury for the Pulitzer Prize in Poetry.

In 2006, McNair was selected for a United States Artists Fellowship.

From 2011 to 2016 McNair served as the Poet Laureate of Maine, sponsoring five statewide poetry initiatives. According to Meg Haskell in the Bangor Daily News on September 30, 2017, his goal was "to demystify poetry and make it more accessible to all Maine people." Quoting McNair, Haskell continues: "The best poems are after insights into the shared human life. They tell us what life is about. What's in it," and "What matters in it." McNair adds that poetry's insights come from intuition, the "truest part of you. The smartest part."

In 2015, McNair was the recipient of the PEN New England Award for Literary Excellence in Poetry, given for The Lost Child: Ozark Poems. In 2023, McNair's collection Late Wonders: New & Selected Poems was named a finalist for the Paterson Poetry Prize.

== Publishing history ==
McNair's poems have appeared widely in literary journals and magazines including AGNI, The American Poetry Review, The Atlantic, The Gettysburg Review, Green Mountain Review, The Iowa Review, The Kenyon Review, Michigan Quarterly Review, Mid-American Review, The New Criterion, New England Review, Pleiades, Ploughshares, Poetry, Poetry Northwest, Prairie Schooner, Sewanee Review, Slate, The Virginia Quarterly Review, Witness, and Yankee Magazine. Featured more than 20 times on The Writer's Almanac with Garrison Keillor, and on National Public Radio's Weekend Edition (Saturday and Sunday programs), McNair's work has also appeared in the Pushcart Prize Annual, two editions of The Best American Poetry, and over sixty anthologies and textbooks.

A selection of twenty- of his poems are featured on the website of the Poetry Foundation.

== Critical praise ==
In an extensive review of McNair's new and selected poems, Lovers of the Lost, in The Harvard Review Kevin T. O'Connor said the book demonstrated "a defining imagination," comparing his poems favorably to the poetry of Robert Lowell, James Wright, Robert Frost, and Seamus Heaney. Robin Becker, writing the judge's citation for McNair's 2015 collection, The Lost Child: Ozark Poems, which won the PEN New England Award for poetry, said: "Wesley McNair harnesses the timeless power of the epic poem to tell the necessary stories of our human tribe...The colloquial music in these poems will move readers to laughter and tears."

Writing on McNair's collection The Ghosts of You and Me for the literary journal Ploughshares in the winter of 2009–2007, the Pulitzer Prize-winning poet Philip Levine called McNair "one of the great storytellers of contemporary poetry." In the same journal in the fall of 2002, Maxine Kumin, the United States Poet Laureate from 1981 to 1982, called McNair "a master craftsman, with a remarkable ear." In a 1989 review that appeared in the Harvard Review, Donald Hall, who served as the United States Poet Laureate from 2006 to 2007, remarked, "Because he is a true poet, his New England is unlimited. Whole lives fill small lines, real to this poet, therefore to us." In the summer of 2002, the Ruminator Review wrote of McNair's book Fire that the poet has created "one of the most individual and original bodies of work by a poet of his generation."

== Collected papers ==
McNair's extensive papers were purchased by Colby College in 2006. Taking up approximately 100 linear feet in the college library's Special Collections, the Wesley McNair Papers include:

- Scrapbooks, photographs, family letters, clippings and ephemera
- Early writings (elementary through high school)
- Notebooks with graduate school writings, teaching notes and poem drafts
- Manuscript drafts, first appearances and audio/visual recordings
- Extensive correspondence (Maine Times colleagues, Donald Hall, literary peers)
- A video of McNair giving a slide presentation and talk about his papers, entitled My Life as a Poet.

In 2010, Colby College's Special Collections Librarian Patricia Burdick launched an innovative new Web site that utilizes McNair's poetry to increase understanding of and appreciation for the making of poetry. The interactive site includes audio recordings and manuscript samples to show the development of selected poems. The site is accompanied by teaching and learning tools. In 2014, McNair's site at Colby launched Letters Between Poets, featuring his correspondence with a mentor, Donald Hall, during his early struggles as a poet. The online correspondence may be accessed by chapters, themes, poems in progress, and a keyword search.

== Bibliography ==
Poetry

- Late Wonders: New & Selected Poems (David R. Godine, 2022)
- Dwellers in the House of the Lord (David R. Godine, 2020)
- The Unfastening (David R. Godine, 2017)
- The Lost Child: Ozark Poems (David R. Godine, 2014)
- Lovers of the Lost: New and Selected Poems (David R. Godine, 2010)
- The Ghosts of You and Me (David R. Godine, 2006)
- Fire (David R. Godine, 2002)
- The Faces of Americans of 1853 (Carnegie Mellon University Press, Classic Contemporaries Series reissue, 2001)
- Talking in the Dark (David R. Godine, 1998)
- The Town of No and My Brother Running (David R. Godine, dual reprint, 1997)
- My Brother Running (David R. Godine, 1994)
- The Town of No (David R. Godine, 1989)
- The Faces of Americans of 1853 (University of Missouri Press, 1983)

Limited Editions

- My Life in Cars (The Ascensius Press, 2020)
- The Dissonant Heart (Romulus Editions, 1995, with photo collages by Dozier Bell)
- Twelve Journeys in Maine (Romulus Editions, 1992, with prints by Marjorie Moore)

Nonfiction

- The Words I Chose: A Memoir of Family and Poetry (Carnegie Mellon University Press, 2012)
- A Place On Water (with Bill Roorbach and Robert Kimber, Tilbury House, 2004)
- Mapping the Heart: Reflections on Place and Poetry (Carnegie Mellon University Press, 2002)

Anthologies (as editor)

- Take Heart: More Poems from Maine (Down East Books, 2016)
- Take Heart: Poems from Maine (Down East Books, 2013)
- Maine in Four Seasons: 20 Poets Celebrate the Turning Year (Down East Books, 2010)
- 2010 Pushcart Prize Annual Guest editor in poetry (Pushcart Press, 2010)
- A Place Called Maine: 24 Authors on the Maine Experience (Down East Books, 2008)
- Contemporary Maine Fiction (Down East Books, 2005)
- The Maine Poets: A Verse Anthology (Down East Books, 2003)
- The Quotable Moose: A Contemporary Maine Reader (University Press of New England, 1994)

== Sources ==
- Author Website
