= Catherine Bowman =

American poet

- Born: El Paso, Texas
- Occupation: Poet
- Employer: Indiana University
- Awards: NYFA Fellowship in Poetry 1990; Kate Tufts Discovery Award 1994 1-800-HOT-RIBS

Catherine Bowman (born in El Paso, Texas) is an American poet.

Her most recent poetry collection is Can I Finish, Please? (Four Way Books, 2016), and her poems have appeared in literary journals and magazines including The Best American Poetry, TriQuarterly, River Styx, Conjunctions, Kenyon Review, Ploughshares, The Los Angeles Times, Crazyhorse, The New Yorker, and The Paris Review, and in six editions of The Best American Poetry. Her honors include fellowships from Yaddo and the New York Foundation for the Arts. Bowman is a full professor in the Creative Writing Program at Indiana University, and also teaches at the Fine Arts Work Center in Provincetown. She lives in Bloomington, Indiana.

== Honors ==
- 1994 Kate Tufts Discovery Award
- Peregrine Smith Poetry Prize
- Dobie Paisano Fellowship from the University of Texas
- 1990 New York Foundation for the Arts Fellowship in Poetry

== Published works ==
Full-length poetry collections

- Can I Finish, Please? (Four Way Books, 2016)
- The Plath Cabinet (Four Way Books, 2009)
- Notarikon. Four Way Books. 2006. ISBN 978-1-884800-70-2.
- Rock Farm. Gibbs Smith. 1996.
- 1-800-HOT-RIBS. Gibbs Smith. 1993. ISBN 978-0-87905-585-1.

Anthologies edited

- Catherine Bowman, ed. (2003). Word of mouth: poems featured on NPR's All things considered. Knopf Doubleday Publishing. ISBN 978-0-375-71315-6.
