= Anna Rabinowitz =

American poet, librettist and editor

Anna Rabinowitz is an American poet, librettist and editor. She has published five volumes of poetry: Words on the Street (Tupelo Press) winner of the Sheila Margaret Motton Book Prize 2017; Present Tense (Omindawn) selected by The Huffington Post as one of the best poetry books of 2010; The Wanton Sublime: A Florilegium of Whethers and Wonders (Tupelo Press); Darkling: A Poem (Tupelo Press); and At the Site of Inside Out (University of Massachusetts Press) winner of the Juniper Prize 1997.

Rabinowitz has collaborated with composers and theatrical artists to create libretti for operatic music theatre performances that bring her poetry to the stage. Words on the Street, collaboratively conceived and developed by poet Rabinowitz, composer Matt Marks, director Kristin Marting, and video artist Lianne Arnold, premiered in New York City in 2018. Due to Marks' untimely death halfway through the production, a group of fellow composers — Lainie Fefferman, John Glover, Mary Kouyoumdjian, David T. Little, Kamala Sankaram, Caroline Shaw, and Randall Woolf — helped complete the score. Rabinowitz has written libretti for The Wanton Sublime, music by Tarik O'Regan, and Darkling, music by Stefan Weisman, both commissioned, developed, and produced by American Opera Projects. Darkling, the opera, was released internationally as a CD by Albany Records in 2011.

Rabinowitz is currently editor emerita of American Letters & Commentary, where she was editor and publisher from 1990 to 2007. She has served on the Board of Governors for the Poetry Society of America, and on the Board of Directors of American Opera Projects. She was a faculty member at The New School from 1994 to 1997. She has been a fellow at Yaddo and at the Virginia Center for the Creative Arts. She has published in literary journals including Atlantic Monthly, Boston Review, The Paris Review, Colorado Review, Southwest Review, Denver Quarterly, Sulfur, LIT, VOLT, and Verse.

Born in Brooklyn, NY, she earned her B.A. from Brooklyn College, magna cum laude, Phi Beta Kappa, and her M.F.A. from Columbia University, School of the Arts.

== Published works ==
=== Poetry ===
- Words on the Street (Tupelo Press, 2016) ISBN 978-1-936797-80-6
- Present Tense (Omnidawn, 2010) ISBN 978-1-890650-45-2
- The Wanton Sublime: A Florilegium of Whethers and Wonders (Tupelo Press, 2006) ISBN 1-932195-39-4, ISBN 978-1-932195-39-2
- Darkling: A Poem (Tupelo Press, 2001) ISBN 0-9710310-4-5
- At the Site of Inside Out (University of Massachusetts Press, 1997) Winner of the Juniper Prize, ISBN 1-55849-093-0, ISBN 1-55849-092-2

=== Translation ===
- Darkling (Luxbooks, Wiesbaden, Germany, 2012) Bi-lingual German translation

=== Anthologies ===
- The Best American Poetry 1989 (Macmillan Publishing Company, 1989)
- Life on the Line (Negative Capability Press, 1990)
- KGB Bar Book of Poems (William Morrow, 2000)
- International Millennium Anthology 2000
- Poetry After 9/11 (Melville House, 2002)
- The Poets' Grimm (Story Line Press, 2003)
- Poetry Daily: 366 Poems from the World's Most Popular Poetry Website (Sourcebooks, 2003)
- Imaginary Poets (Tupelo Press, 2005)
- The Paradelle (Red Hen Press, spring 2006)
- Blood to Remember (Time Being Books, 2007)
- Women Poets on Mentorship (University of Iowa Press, 2008)
- After Shocks, The Poetry of Recovery for Life-Shattering Events (Sante Lucia Books, 2008)

=== Critical Essays ===
- "We Take With Us What We Leave Behind" (Many Mountains Moving, A Tribute to W.S. Merwin, Volume IV, Number 2, 2001)
- "Barbara Guest: Notes Toward Painterly Osmosis" (Women's Studies, Harwood Academic Publishers, Vol. 30, Number 1, 2001)
- "On Collaboration" (American Letters & Commentary, Nineteen, 2008)

== Libretti/ Operatic Music Theater ==
=== Words on the Street ===
- Baruch Performing Arts Center, New York, NY (October/November 2018)

=== The Wanton Sublime ===
- Grimeborn Festival at the Arcola Theatre, London, UK (August 2015)
- Roulette, Brooklyn, NY (April 2014)
- Berlind Theater, McCarter Theatre Center, Princeton University, Princeton, NJ (July 2012)
- The Players Club, New York, NY (May 2011)
- South Oxford Space, Brooklyn, NY (May 2011)
- The Woven Child, Works and Process at the Guggenheim Museum, NY (January 2010)

=== Darkling ===
- Premiere by American Opera Projects at the East 13th Street Theater, NY (3-week off-Broadway run, 2006)
- Third Eye Theatre Ensemble, directed by Susan Padveen, Theatre Wit, Chicago, Illinois (October 2019)
- Freie Universität Berlin, Germany, (June 2007)
- Alexsandre Fredo Theatre, Gniezno, Poland (June 2007)
- New York City Opera VOX 2007, Skirball Center for Performing Arts, New York University, NY (2007)
- The Philadelphia Fringe Festival, Center City Opera at The Lantern Theater, PA (2009)
- 21c Arias at Galapagos Art Space in Brooklyn, NY
- The German Consulate General, NY (June 2006)
- Choral Concert performed by St. Joseph's Choir and Flux Quartet at St. Joseph's Church, NY (November 2006)
- Works and Process at the Guggenheim Museum, NY (November 2005)

==== Discography ====
- CD release of complete concert version, Albany Records (2011)

== Honors and awards ==
- 1 2017 Shelia Margaret Motton Book Prize of the New England Poetry Club, for Words on the Street
- 2 2001 A National Endowment for the Arts Fellow
- 3 1996 Juniper Prize, for At the Site of Inside Out
- 4 1993 Black Warrior Review Literary Prize

== Reviews ==
- from Words on the Street review by Olivia Giovetti in National Sawdust Log: "Matt Marks [composer] saw his work on Words on the Street as 'a gradual act of opening the sonic, dramatic, and visual possibilities of Anna's poems to be shared with our eventual audiences', who...'weren't bred to be [music theatre hybrid] aficionados'...Words on the Street combines this musical point of access with a plot...entrenched in metaphor...a deliberate combination of unlikely forms meant to reflect on disaster in a time of excess and pleasure...treads an...inattentive earth in search of the observant versus the didactic."
- from Darkling CD review by Alan Lockwood in Time Out: "…textured with vocal and string quartet sequences that smolder or gleam, Darkling is a memory quest and testimonial to broken knowledge…Voices hover and parry, with Weisman's arias providing both tension and release…Darkling is deeply mindful work."
- from Darkling opera review by Steve Smith in Night After Night: "Let Darkling serve as a reminder that opera can also be what and where it is found. This is a profound, provocative piece of musical theater—one that I hope will occasion a great many opera lovers to stray from habitual paths. As specific as the context of Darkling may be, its message is ultimately universal".
- from Present Tense review by Anis Shivani in The Huffington Post: "Anna Rabinowitz does apocalypse so well I can't get enough of it" "…Rabinowitz has the audacity to recognize how battered we have become by the inextricable link between desire and destruction".
- from The Wanton Sublime review by Janet St. John in Booklist: "The poems do form a "bouquet," plucked from varying sources of truths, lies, and artistic inquisition. Rabinowitz is a highly intellectual poet with unique vision and a distinct voice".
- from Darkling review in Publishers Weekly: "This dense, unsettling volume makes a unique contribution to Holocaust literature".
- from At the Site of Inside Out review by Claudia Keelan in the Denver Quarterly: "…Anna Rabinowitz confounds both the traditional ideas of closure and postmodern glorification of release, in favor of the pilgrimage that all great writing undertakes…an astonishing book…poem after poem testifies to the inevitable physical relationship between language and life".
