= Elaine Equi =

American poet

Elaine Equi (born 1953) is an American poet.

Equi was born in Oak Park, Illinois and grew up in the Chicago area. Both her parents emigrated from Italy in the 1920s. Since 1988 she has lived in New York City with her husband, poet Jerome Sala. She currently teaches creative writing in the Master of Fine Arts programs at City College of New York and The New School. Widely published, her poems have appeared in Big Other, The New Yorker, American Poetry Review, and numerous volumes of The Best American Poetry. In April 2007 Coffee House Press published Ripple Effect: New and Selected Poems. Also in 2007 she edited a special section for Jacket Magazine: The Holiday Album: Greeting Card Poems For All Occasions.

== Works ==
- Federal Woman (Danaides, 1978)
- Shrewcrazy (Little Caeser, 1981)
- The Corners of the Mouth (Iridescence, 1986)
- Accessories (Figures, 1988)
- Views Without Rooms (Hanuman Books, 1989)
- Surface Tension (Coffee House, 1989)
- Decoy (Coffee House, 1994)
- Friendship with Things (Figures, 1998)
- Voice-Over (Coffee House, 1999)
- The Cloud of Knowable Things (Coffee House, 2003)
- Ripple Effect: New and Selected Poems (Coffee House, 2007)(shortlisted for the 2008 International Griffin Poetry Prize)
- Click and Clone (Coffee House, 2011)
- Sentences and Rain (Coffee House, 2015)
- The Intangibles (Coffee House, 2019)
- Out of the Blank (Coffee House, 2025)
