= Elizabeth Spires =

American poet and university professor (born 1952)

- Education: Vassar College, Johns Hopkins University
- Occupations: Poet and university professor
- Writing career
- Language: English

Elizabeth Spires (born May 1952 Lancaster, Ohio) is an American poet and university professor.

== Early life and education ==
Spires was raised in Circleville, Ohio. She graduated from Vassar College and Johns Hopkins University.

== Career ==
Spires is a professor of English at Goucher College, where she holds a Chair for Distinguished Achievement. Her poems have appeared in The New Yorker, Poetry, American Poetry Review, The Paris Review and many other literary magazines and anthologies.

== Awards and honors ==
She has been the recipient of the Amy Lowell Poetry Travelling Scholarship, a Whiting Award, a Guggenheim Fellowship, the Witter Bynner Prize from the American Academy of Arts and Letters, two Ohioana Book Awards, and the Maryland Author Award from the Maryland Library Association.

== Selected works ==
=== Poetry ===
- Globe. Middletown, Conn.: Wesleyan. March 1, 1981. ISBN 978-0-8195-1101-0.
- Annonciade. New York: Puffin. July 1, 1989. ISBN 978-0-14-058638-1.
- Worldlings. W. W. Norton & Company. May 1, 1992. ISBN 978-0-393-31628-5.
- Swan's Island. New York: Carnegie-Mellon University Press. February 1997. ISBN 978-0-88748-249-6.
- Now the Green Blade Rises. W. W. Norton. 2004. ISBN 978-0-393-32485-3.
- The Wave-Maker. W. W. Norton. 2008. ISBN 978-0-393-06659-3.
- "Riddle". The Atlantic. June 2009.
- A Memory of the Future. W. W. Norton. 2018. ISBN 978-0-393-65105-8.

=== Children's books ===
- The Mouse of Amherst. Illustrator Claire A. Nivola. Scholastic. 2001. ISBN 978-0-439-20088-2.
- I heard God talking to me: William Edmonton and his Stone Carvings. Frances Foster Books. 2009. ISBN 978-0-374-33528-1.
- With one white wing: puzzles in poems and pictures. Illustrator Erik Blegvad. M.K. McElderry Books. 1995. ISBN 978-0-689-50622-2.

=== Edited ===
- The Instant of Knowing: Lectures, Criticism and Occasional Prose by Josephine Jacobsen.

=== Anthologies ===
- A. R. Ammons; David Lehman, eds. (1994). The Best American Poetry 1994. Simon & Schuster. ISBN 978-0-671-89948-6.
