= Aaron Fogel =

American poet

- Born: January 12, 1947; New York City, New York, U.S.
- Died: November 6, 2024; Cambridge, Massachusetts, U.S.
- Education: Columbia College
- Occupations: Poet and academic
- Writing career
- Subject: Poetry
- Notable awards: Guggenheim Fellowship (1987)

Aaron Moses Fogel was an American poet and academic.

== Life ==
Raised in New York City, he attended Columbia University (BA) and Cambridge University (BA/MA), before returning to Columbia University, from which he earned a Ph.D.

Fogel was a member of the English faculty at Boston University from 1978 until 2018, when he retired as Associate Professor Emeritus.

His work appeared in AGNI, American Poet, Boulevard, Matrix, No, Pequod, The Stud Duck, and elsewhere.

== Awards ==
- 2005 Gitner Award for Distinguished Teaching
- 2001 Kahn Award for 'The Printer's Error
- 1987-88 Guggenheim Fellow
- 1967-69 Kellett Fellowship

== Works ==
- "People", poets.org
- "Shore Container", poets.org
- "The Goat", poets.org
- "The Man Who Never Heard of Frank Sinatra", poets.org
- "The Riddle of Flat Circles [excerpt]", poets.org
- "Cobblestones", Octopus
- The printer's error. Miami University Press. 2001. ISBN 978-1-881163-35-0.
- Chain hearings. Inwood Press. 1976. ISBN 978-0-8180-1530-4.

=== Criticism ===
- Coercion to speak: Conrad's poetics of dialogue. Harvard University Press. 1985. ISBN 978-0-674-13639-7.

=== Anthologies ===
- David Lehman, ed. (2006). The Oxford book of American poetry. Oxford University Press. ISBN 978-0-19-516251-6.
- Billy Collins, ed. (2003). Poetry 180: a turning back to poetry. Random House Trade Paperbacks. ISBN 978-0-8129-6887-3.
- Harold Bloom; David Lehman, eds. (1998). The best of the best American poetry, 1988-1997. Scribner. ISBN 978-0-684-84279-0.
- Lyn Hejinian; David Lehman, eds. (2004). "3337,000, December, 2000". The best American poetry, 2004. Simon and Schuster. ISBN 978-0-7432-5757-2.

== Reviews ==
A couple of years ago--would it have been 1995 or ‘96?--carelessly flipping through The Best American Poetry, 1995 (an anthology that, to its editor, Richard Howard’s credit, was full of poets a lot of people hadn't heard of) I was stopped dead in my tracks by a truly wondrous poem: "The Printer’s Error" by Aaron Fogel. It was deceptively simple, direct, moving and thoroughly astounding, full of political, religious and cultural truth. Who (I asked myself and everyone else who might conceivably know) was this Aaron Fogel?
