= Suzanne Gardinier =

American poet (born 1961)

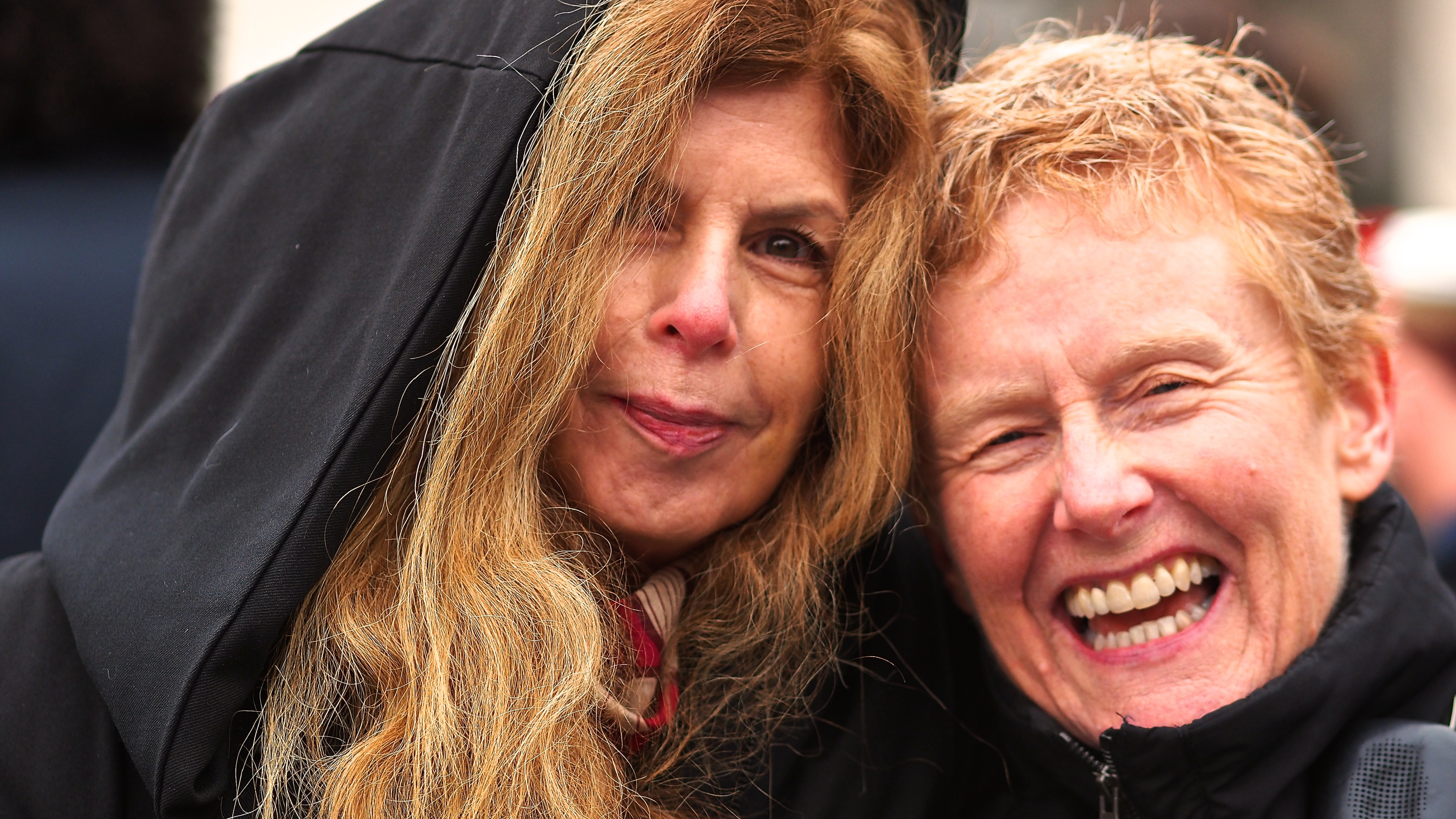
- Gardinier with poet Marie Howe during a rally at Washington Square, New York, in December 2014
- Born: 1961 (age 64–65); New Bedford, Massachusetts, U.S.
- Education: University of Massachusetts Amherst (BA); Columbia University (MFA)
- Occupation: Poet

Suzanne Gardinier (born 1961 in New Bedford, Massachusetts) is an American poet. She is a recipient of the Lannan Literary Award for Poetry.

== Life ==
Gardinier grew up in Scituate, Massachusetts. She completed her B.A. at the University of Massachusetts Amherst in 1981, and her MFA at Columbia University, in 1986. She is the author of a long poem called The New World. She teaches at Sarah Lawrence College, is a member of PEN, and lives in Manhattan.

Her work appears in The Kenyon Review, The Paris Review, Ploughshares, and AGNI.

== Awards ==
The New World won the Associated Writing Program's Award Series in poetry in 1992. Suzanne has also received awards from the New York Foundation for the Arts, the Lannan Foundation, and the Kenyon Review Award for Excellence in the Essay.

== Work ==
- "Dialogue 20 / Chickens; Ghazal 16; Ghazal 23". Reading Between A+B.
- "To the City of Fire; Blues". The Language Exchange. Sarah Lawrence College.
- "Ghazals 9; 11; 45". National Public Radio. May 23, 2008.

=== Poetry ===
- Usahn: Ten Poems and a Story, (Grand Street Books, 1990)
- The New World, (Pittsburgh 1993)
- Today:101 Ghazals, (Sheep Meadow Press, 2008)
- Dialogue with the Archipelago, (Sheep Meadow Press, 2009)

Iridium and Selected Poems (Sheep Meadow Press, 2010)

=== Essays ===
- "Faculty Advisor 2003 Suzanne Gardinier". The Phoenix. Sarah Lawrence College. October 17, 2003.
- "What is American About American Poetry?". Poetry Society of America. November 1999.
- A World That Will Hold All the People (University of Michigan Press 1996)

=== Anthologies ===
- Nicholas Christopher, ed. (1989). Under 35: the new generation of American poets. Anchor Book. ISBN 978-0-385-26035-0.
- Donald Hall, David Lehman, ed. (October 1989). Best American Poems 1989. Collier Books. ISBN 978-0-02-044182-3.

== Reviews ==
SOMETIMES it seems sweetness exists in a voice. A child who sang, for whom life had no business being sweet. "I had the fortune to sing well, and to sing in the church choir from the age of 5 until I was 16," said the young poet Suzanne Gardinier, whose new book of poems was awarded the yearly Pitt Poetry Prize by the University of Pittsburgh Press, who in it has taken on the choral voices of both city and land, as she circles the 50-mile radius from the foot of the statue of Columbus in Columbus Circle, and then out through New Jersey, New York and Long Island, calling back the ghosts of harvests past and trades untenable, and the souls of new immigrants just coming. It is a book that does not look flinchingly at violence, whether between schoolchildren for whom nobody "turned a face to them judged/ their dispute wiped their cheeks sent them back to their lessons," or the men who cruelly, sensuously fight one another outside bars, the soldiers who forget even the old Greek sensuality of why they are fighting.
