= Amy Clampitt =

American writer (1920–1994)

- Born: June 15, 1920
- Died: September 10, 1994 (aged 74)
- Education: Grinnell College
- Occupations: Poet; author

Amy Clampitt (June 15, 1920 – September 10, 1994) was an American poet and author.

== Life ==
Clampitt was born on June 15, 1920, of Quaker parents, and brought up in New Providence, Iowa. At nearby Grinnell College and later in the American Academy of Arts and Letters she began a study of English literature that eventually led her to poetry. Clampitt graduated with honors in English from Grinnell College in 1941, and from that time on lived mainly in New York City. To support herself, she worked as a secretary at the Oxford University Press, a reference librarian at the Audubon Society, and a freelance editor.

Not until the mid-1960s, when Clampitt was in her forties, did she return to writing poetry. Her first poem was published by The New Yorker in 1978. In 1983, at the age of sixty-three, Clampitt published her first full-length collection, The Kingfisher. In the decade that followed, Clampitt published five books of poetry, including What the Light Was Like (1985), and Archaic Figure (1987). In 1988, Clampitt was among three judges for that year's National Poetry Competition sponsored by The Chester H. Jones Foundation. Her 1990 Westward was selected by critic Harold Bloom for inclusion in his Western Canon. Her last book, A Silence Opens, appeared in 1994, the year of her death. Clampitt also published a book of essays and several privately printed editions of her longer poems. She taught at the College of William and Mary, Smith College, and Amherst College, but it was her time spent in Manhattan, in a remote part of Maine, and on various trips to Europe, the former Soviet Union, Iowa, Wales, and England that most directly influenced her work.

Clampitt died of cancer in September 1994.

An Amy Clampitt Residency was established in Lenox, Massachusetts at Clampitt’s former home.

== Awards ==
Clampitt was the recipient of a 1982 Guggenheim Fellowship, a MacArthur Fellowship (1992), and she was a member of the American Academy of Arts and Letters and the American Academy of Poets.

== Works ==
=== Poetry collections ===
- Multitudes, Multitudes (Washington Street Press, 1973).
- The Isthmus (1981).
- The Summer Solstice (Sarabande Press, 1983).
- The Kingfisher (Knopf, 1983). ISBN 0-394-52840-9.
- What the Light Was Like (Knopf, 1983). ISBN 0-394-54318-1.
- Archaic Figure (Knopf, 1987). ISBN 0-394-75090-X.
- Westward (Knopf, 1990). ISBN 0-394-58455-4.
- Manhattan: An Elegy, and Other Poems (University of Iowa Center for the Book, 1990).
- A Silence Opens (Knopf, 1994). ISBN 0-679-75022-3.
- The Collected Poems of Amy Clampitt (Knopf, 1997). ISBN 0-375-70064-1.
- "A Homage to John Keats" (The Sarabande Press, 1984)

=== Prose ===
- A Homage to John Keats (Sarabande Press, 1984).
- The Essential Donne (Ecco Press, 1988). ISBN 0-88001-480-6.
- Predecessors, Et Cetera: Essays (University of Michigan Press, 1991). ISBN 0-472-06457-6.

== Biography ==
- Willard Spiegelman, Nothing Stays Put: The Life and Poetry of Amy Clampitt, Knopf, 2023.
