= David Budbill =

American author

- Born: June 13, 1940; Cleveland, Ohio, U.S.
- Died: September 25, 2016 (aged 76); Montpelier, Vermont, U.S.
- Occupations: Poet, playwright
- Spouse: Lois Eby
- Children: 1

David Wolf Budbill (June 13, 1940 – September 25, 2016) was an American poet and playwright. He was the author of eight books of poems, eight plays, two novels, a collection of short stories, a children's picture book, and dozens of essays.

== Early life ==
David Wolf Budbill was born on June 13, 1940, in Cleveland, Ohio. He studied philosophy and art history at Muskingum College in New Concord, Ohio. In 1967, he graduated from college with a degree in theology, and from the Union Theological Seminary in New York City, where he was influenced by the writings of Thomas Merton.

== Career ==
His three most recent books of poems are "Tumbling toward the End" (Copper Canyon Press, 2017), Happy Life (Copper Canyon Press, 2011), and While We've Still Got Feet (Copper Canyon Press, 2005). His collection of narrative poems, Judevine, was republished in an expanded edition by Chelsea Green Publishing Company in 1999. A newly revised edition titled Judevine: A Love Song for a Place and Its People was published in 2025 by Rootstock Publishing.

His play Judevine, a stage version of his narrative poems, had 65 productions in 22 states since the early 1980s. Among Budbill's other plays are Little Acts of Kindness, Thingy World!, Two for Christmas, and his latest, first produced in 2010, A Song for My Father. Zen Mountains/Zen Streets and Songs for a Suffering World, both, audio CDs of his poetry, with the music of jazz bassist and composer William Parker and drummer Hamid Drake were released on the Boxholder Records label in 1999 and 2003. Inspired by ancient Chinese and Japanese reclusive poets, Budbill kept alive a discourse about his struggles living a simple life in a complex modern time. Garrison Keillor read frequently from David's poems on The Writer's Almanac on National Public Radio (NPR).

Among his honors and prizes were his first Honorary Doctor of Humane Letters from New England College, in Henniker, New Hampshire, in January 2009. His other prizes and honors include: a Guggenheim Fellowship in Poetry in 1981, a National Endowment for the Arts Play Writing Fellowship in 1991, The Dorothy Canfield Fisher Children's Book Award in 1980, and The Vermont Arts Council's Walter Cerf Award for Lifetime Achievement in the Arts in 2002. In November 2009, Budbill was inducted as a Fellow into the Vermont Academy of Arts and Letters. In 2011, he received the Kjell Meling Memorial Award for Distinction in the Arts & Humanities, presented by Pennsylvania State University/Altoona. He was also the recipient of a National Endowment for the Arts fellowship in playwriting, a 1982 Guggenheim Fellowship in poetry, and a Dorothy Canfield Fisher Award for fiction.

== Personal life and death ==
Budbill lived in the mountains of northern Vermont with his wife, painter Lois Eby; their daughter is the poet Nadine Wolf Budbill. His papers are held at University of Vermont.

In 1968, Budbill signed the "Writers and Editors War Tax Protest" pledge, vowing to refuse tax payments in protest against the Vietnam War.

Budbill died at the age of 76 with his family by his side at his home in Montpelier at 12:30am September 25, 2016 from Parkinson's disease. He was posthumously named The People's Poet of Vermont by the Vermont legislature.

== Selected works ==
=== Poetry ===
- Barking Dog (Barking Dog Press, 1968)
- The Chain Saw Dance (Crow's Mark Press, 1977; Countryman Press, 1983)
- From Down to the Village (The Ark, 1981)
- Why I Came to Judevine (White Pine Press, 1987)
- Judevine: The Complete Poems (Chelsea Green, 1991, 1999)
- Moment to Moment: Poems of a Mountain Recluse (Copper Canyon Press, 1999)
- While We've Still Got Feet (Copper Canyon Press, 2005)
- Happy Life (Copper Canyon Press, 2011)
- Park Songs (Exterminating Angel Press, 2012)
- Tumbling toward the End (Copper Canyon Press, 2017)
- Judevine: A Love Song for a Place and Its People (Rootstock Publishing, 2025)

=== Compact discs ===
- Zen Mountains-Zen Streets: A Duet for Poet and Improvised Bass (with bassist William Parker) (Boxholder Records, 1999)
- Songs for a Suffering World: A Prayer for Peace, a Protest Against War (with bassist William Parker and drummer Hamid Drake) (Boxholder Records, 2003)

=== Plays ===
- Mannequins' Demise (1965)
- Knucklehead Rides Again (1966)
- Pulp Cutters' Nativity (Countryman Press, 1981)
- Judevine: The Play (New American Play 2, Heinemann, 1990)
- Thingy World (1991)
- Little Acts of Kindness: A Poem for Fourteen Voices and Blues Band (1993)
- Two For Christmas (1997)
- A Song For My Father (2010)

=== Opera librettos ===
- A Fleeting Animal: An Opera from Judevine (with composer Erik Nielsen) (2000)

=== Cyberzines ===
- The Judeville Mountain Emailite: An On-line and On-going Journal of Politics and Opinion

=== Short stories ===
- Snowshoe Trek to Otter River (The Dial Press, 1976; Onion River Press, 2005)

=== Novels ===
- Broken Wing (Green Writers Press, 2016; Beyond Words, 2019)
- The Bones on Black Spruce Mountain (The Dial Press, 1978; Onion River Press, 2004)

=== Children's books ===
- Christmas Tree Farm (Macmillan, 1974)

=== Edited volumes ===
- Danvis Tales: Selected Stories by Rowland E. Robinson (University Press of New England, 1995)
