= Rodney Jones (poet) =

American poet

Rodney Glenn Jones (born 1950) is an American poet and retired professor of English at Southern Illinois University at Carbondale.

He was born and reared near Falkville, Alabama, gained a B.A. in 1971 at the University of Alabama and an M.F.A. at the University of North Carolina at Greensboro in 1973. He taught poetry at high schools in Tennessee, Alabama and Virginia from 1974 to 1978 and then became a writer in residence at Virginia Intermont College from 1979 to 1984. He was finally appointed Professor of English at the Southern Illinois University in Carbondale. He retired in 2012.

Jones was named a finalist for the Pulitzer Prize and the winner of the 1989 National Book Critics Circle Award. His other honors include a Guggenheim Fellowship (1985), the Peter I.B. Lavan Award from the Academy of American Poets, the Jean Stein Award from the American Academy and Institute of Arts and Letters, a Southeast Booksellers Association Award, and a Harper Lee Award.

== Bibliography ==
- Going Ahead Looking Back (1978)
- The Story They Told Us of Light (1980)
- The Unborn (1985)
- Transparent Gestures (1989)
- Apocalyptic Narrative (1993)
- Things That Happen Once (1996)
- Elegy for the Southern Drawl (1999)
- Kingdom of the Instant: Poems (2004)
- Salvation Blues (2006) (winner of the Kingsley Tufts Poetry Award, shortlisted for the 2007 International Griffin Poetry Prize)
- Imaginary Logic (2011)
- Village Prodigies (2017)
