= Linda Gregg =

American poet (1942–2019)

- Born: September 9, 1942; Suffern, New York
- Died: March 20, 2019 (aged 76); New York City
- Writing career
- Genre: Poetry

Linda Alouise Gregg (September 9, 1942 – March 20, 2019) was an American poet.

== Biography ==
Gregg was born in Suffern, New York. She grew up on the other side of the country, in Marin County, California. Gregg received both her Bachelor of Arts, in 1967, and her Master of Arts, in 1972, from San Francisco State College. Her first book of poems, Too Bright to See, was published in 1981.

She was in a long relationship with poet Jack Gilbert, and later married writer, political activist, and philosophy professor John Brentlinger. The couple divorced in 1990.

Her published books include Things and Flesh, Chosen By The Lion, The Sacraments of Desire, Alma, Too Bright to See, In the Middle Distance, and All of it Singing. Her poems also appeared in numerous literary magazines, including Ploughshares, The New Yorker, the Paris Review, the Kenyon Review, and the Atlantic Monthly.

She began teaching poetry at such schools as Indian Valley Colleges, University of Arizona, Napa State, and Louisiana State University. She later taught at the University of Iowa, Columbia University, the University of California at Berkeley, the University of Houston, and the University of North Carolina at Greensboro. Starting in 2006, she lived in New York City's East Village, and for two years was a lecturer in the Creative Writing Program in the University Center for the Creative and Performing Arts at Princeton University.

On March 20, 2019, she died of cancer at the Beth Israel Hospital in New York City.

== Awards ==
- 1982 Guggenheim Fellowship
- 1985 Whiting Award
- 1993 National Endowment for the Arts grant
- 2003 Sara Teasdale Award
- 2003 Lannan Literary Foundation Fellowship
- 2006 PEN/Voelcker Award for Poetry
- 2009 Jackson Poetry Prize (awarded by Poets & Writers)
- multiple Pushcart Prizes

== Her work ==
"Linda Gregg brings us back to poetry. . . . She is original and mysterious, one of the best poets in America", says Gerald Stern.

Much of Linda Gregg's poetry is inspired by her extensive travels. Her work has received enormous critical praise for its soaring lyrical depictions of grief and loss, and the strange strengths and beauty she mines from them. Joseph Brodsky once stated that "[t]he blinding intensity of Ms. Gregg's lines stains the reader's psyche the way lightning or heartbreak do."

The poet Czesław Miłosz said, "I consider Linda Gregg to be one of the best American poets, and I value the neatness of design in her poems, as well as the energy of each line." W. S. Merwin confessed:

"I have loved Linda Gregg's poems since I first read them. They are original in the way that really matters: they speak clearly of their source. They are inseparable from the surprising, unrolling, eventful, pure current of their language, and they convey at once the pain of individual loss, a steady and utterly personal radiance."

== Works ==
- Too bright to see: poems, Port Townsend, Wash.: Graywolf Press, 1981. ISBN 9780915308279, OCLC 7534170
- Alma, New York: Random House, 1985. ISBN 9780394741277, OCLC 11812467
- The Sacraments of Desire, Saint Paul, Minn.: Graywolf Press, 1991. ISBN 9781555971519, OCLC 611398960
- Chosen by the lion: poems, St. Paul, MN: Graywolf Press, 1995. ISBN 9781555972073, OCLC 500079693
- Things and flesh: poems, Saint Paul, Minn.: Graywolf Press, 1999. ISBN 9781555972936, OCLC 42520436
- Too bright to see; & Alma: poems, Saint Paul, Minn.: Graywolf Press, 2002. ISBN 9781555973575, OCLC 48934650
- In the middle distance: poems, Saint Paul, Minn.: Graywolf Press, 2006. ISBN 9781555974398, OCLC 63790477
- All of it singing: new and selected poems, Saint Paul, Minnesota: Graywolf Press, 2008. ISBN 9781555975074, OCLC 191925008
