= Barbara Cooney =

American writer and illustrator of children's books

- Born: August 6, 1917; Brooklyn, New York
- Died: March 10, 2000 (aged 82); Portland, Maine
- Education: Smith College; Art Students League of New York
- Occupations: Artist/illustrator, writer
- Writing career
- Period: 1940–1999
- Genres: Children's picture books; fiction; poetry
- Notable works: Chanticleer and the Fox (1959); Ox-Cart Man (1980); Miss Rumphius (1983)
- Notable awards: Caldecott Medal; 1959, 1980; National Book Award; 1983
- Website: www.barbaracooney.com

Barbara Cooney (August 6, 1917 – March 10, 2000) was an American writer and illustrator of 110 children's books, published for over sixty years. She received two Caldecott Medals for her work on Chanticleer and the Fox (1958) and Ox-Cart Man (1979), and a National Book Award for Miss Rumphius (1982). Her books have been translated into ten languages.

For her contribution as a children's illustrator, Cooney was the U.S. nominee in 1994 for the biennial, international Hans Christian Andersen Award, the highest international recognition for creators of children's books.

== Life ==
Cooney was born on 6 August 1917 in Room 1127 of the Hotel Bossert in Brooklyn, New York, to Russell Schenck Cooney (a stockbroker) and his wife Mae Evelyn Bossert (a painter). She had a twin brother and two younger brothers. Her family moved to Long Island when she was two, where she attended Buckley Country Day School and later boarding school. She started drawing and painting early in life, and was encouraged by her mother but allowed to learn independently.

Cooney graduated from Smith College with a history degree in 1938, but continued working at art, taking classes on black and white drawing, etching, and lithography at the Art Students League of New York in 1940. She began to make connections in the publishing world. Her first professional illustration was for Ake and His World by the Swedish poet Bertil Malmberg, which was published in 1940, a year after she graduated.

During World War II, Cooney served in the Women’s Army Corps. Soon after her service, she met and married journalist Guy Murchie in 1944. They had two children, Gretel and Barnaby, and divorced in 1947. In July 1949, she married Charles Talbot Porter; they had two children together: Phoebe and Charlie Porter.

Cooney had continued her illustration work. In 1959, she won the Caldecott Medal for Chanticleer and the Fox, writing and illustrating her version of the fable, "Chanticleer and the Fox." This was developed by Chaucer in his "The Nun's Priest's Tale." Beginning in her 40s, Cooney frequently traveled, gaining inspiration for illustrations and her writing. At home, she lived in Damariscotta, Maine, in a house built for her by one of her sons.

Among her many books, Cooney illustrated Ox-Cart Man (1980), written by American poet Donald Hall, for which she received her second Caldecott Medal. In 1975, she illustrated When the Sky is Like Lace. Written by Elinor Lander Horwitz, the book was selected as a New York Times Outstanding Book of the Year. With her book Miss Rumphius (1983), which she wrote and illustrated, she won the National Book Award in category Picture Books. That year William Steig and his Doctor De Soto also shared the award.

In 1989, the Maine Library Association awarded her the inaugural Lupine Award, given to resident authors of outstanding children's books. In 1996, Maine Governor Angus King honored Cooney by proclaiming a day in her name as "Barbara Cooney Day". Her last book, Basket Moon (2000), was published six months before her death at a hospital in Portland on March 10, 2000.

Portions of her original artwork are being displayed at Bowdoin College in Maine.

== Style ==
Throughout her career, Cooney used a variety of techniques, preferring pen and ink, acrylic paints, and pastels. Her illustrations are often described as folk art. She most often chose folk stories to illustrate. While many of her books were in black and white, her "heart and soul are in color". Her work, particularly her black and white drawings, were influenced by Hokusai and Aubrey Beardsley.

== Quotes ==
- On her mother:

"She gave me all the materials I could wish for and then left me alone, didn’t smother me with instruction. Not that I ever took instruction very easily. My favorite days were when I had a cold and could stay home from school and draw all day long.... She was an enthusiastic painter of oils and watercolors. She was also very generous. I could mess with her paints and brushes all I wanted. On one condition: that I kept my brushes clean. The only art lesson my mother gave me was how to wash my brushes. Otherwise, she left me alone."

- On Smith College and her art: "I have felt way behind technically; and what I’ve learned I have had to teach myself. To this day, I don’t consider myself a very skillful artist."
- On her travels and learning the spirit of place:

“It was not until I was in my forties, in the fifth decade of my life, that the sense of place, the spirit of place, became of paramount importance to me. It was then that I began my travels, that I discovered, through photography, the quality of light, and that I gradually became able to paint the mood of place.”

- On receiving the Caldecott Medal in 1959:

"I believe that children in this country need a more robust literary diet than they are getting.... It does not hurt them to read about good and evil, love and hate, life and death. Nor do I think they should read only about things that they understand.... a man’s reach should exceed his grasp. So should a child’s. For myself, I will never talk down to—or draw down to—children."

- On her favorite works: "Of all the books I have done, 'Miss Rumphius,' 'Island Boy,' and 'Hattie and the Wild Waves,' are the closest to my heart. These three are as near as I ever will come to an autobiography".

== Books written and/or illustrated ==
- Ake and His World, by Bertil Malmberg [1924, Swedish], 1940
- Uncle Snowball, 1940
- The King of Wreck Island, 1941
- The Kellyhorns, 1942
- Captain Pottle's House, 1943
- Shooting Star Farm, 1946
- American Folk Songs for Children, by Ruth Crawford Seeger, 1948
- Just Plain Maggie, by Lorraine Beim, 1948
- The Best Christmas, by Lee Kingman, 1949
- Kildee House, by Rutherford George Montgomery, 1949
- The Man Who Didn't Wash His Dishes, by Phyllis Krasilovsky, 1950
- Read Me More Stories, 1951
- The Pony That Ran Away, 1951
- The Pony That Kept a Secret, 1952
- Too Many Pets, by Mary M. Aldrich, 1952
- Yours with Love, Kate, by Miriam Mason, 1952
- Christmas in the Barn, by Margaret Wise Brown, 1952
- Where Have You Been?, by Margaret Wise Brown, 1952
- American Folk Songs for Christmas, by Ruth Crawford Seeger, 1953
- Five Little Peppers (Margaret Sidney?), 1954
- The Little Fir Tree, by Margaret Wise Brown, 1954
- Little Women, by Louisa May Alcott [1868–69], 1955
- City Springtime, by Helen Kay, 1957
- Freckle Face, by Neil Anderson, 1957
- Chanticleer and the Fox, from Chaucer, adapted by Cooney, 1958
- The American Speller, 1961
- The Little Juggler, adapted by Cooney, 1961
- Le Hibou et La Poussiquette, poem by Edward Lear [1871], translation by Francis Steegmuller, 1961
- Favorite Fairy Tales Told in Spain, 1963
- Wynken, Blynken and Nod, poem by Eugene Field [1889], 1964
- Papillot, Clignot et Dodo, poem by Eugene Field [1889], translation by Francis Steegmuller and Norbert Guterman, 1964
- Mother Goose in French, translations by Hugh Latham, 1964
- The Courtship, Merry Marriage, and Feast of Cock Robin and Jenny Wren, 1965
- Katie’s Magic Glasses, by Jane Goodsell, 1965
- Snow White and Rose Red, based on Brothers Grimm [German], 1966
- How the Hibernators Came to Bethlehem, 1966
- A Little Prayer, 1967
- Christmas, 1967
- The Crows of Pearblossom, by Aldous Huxley, 1967
- A Garland of Games and Other Diversions, 1969
- The Owl and the Pussycat, poem by Edward Lear [1871], 1969
- Bambi, a Life in the Woods, by Felix Salten [1923, German], 1970
- Princess Tales, 1971
- Seven Little Rabbits, by John Becker, 1972
- Squawk to the Moon, Little Goose, by Edna Mitchell Preston, 1974
- Herman the Great, by Zora Louise Olsen, 1974
- Favourite Fairy Tales Told in Spain, retold by Virginia Haviland, 1974
- When the Sky is Like Lace, written by Elinor Lander Horwitz, a New York Times Outstanding Book of the Year, 1975. Reissued 2015
- Burton and Dudley, by Marjorie W. Sharmat, 1975
- The Donkey Prince, by M. Jean Craig, 1977
- Midsummer magic: a garland of stories, charms, and recipes, compiled by Ellin Greene, 1977
- Ox-Cart Man, poem by Donald Hall, 1979
- I Am Cherry Alive, the Little Girl Sang, poem by Delmore Schwartz, 1979
- Emma, by Wendy Kesselman, 1980
- Tortillitas Para Mama and Other Nursery Rhymes, selected and translated by Margot C. Griego, 1981
- Little Brother and Little Sister, based on Brothers Grimm, 1982
- Miss Rumphius, 1982
- Spirit Child: A Story of the Nativity, 1984
- The Story of Holly and Ivy, by Rumer Godden [1958], 1985
- Peter and the Wolf Pop-Up Book, 1986
- Louhi, Witch of North Farm: A Story From Finland's Epic Poem 'The Kalevala', 1986
- Island Boy, 1988
- The Year of the Perfect Christmas Tree, by Gloria Houston, 1988
- Hattie and the Wild Waves: A story of Brooklyn, 1990
- The Big Book for Peace, by John Bierhorst, 1990
- Roxaboxen, by Alice McLerran, 1991
- Letting Swift River Go, by Jane Yolen, 1991
- Emily, by Michael Bedard, 1992 – historical fiction based on Emily Dickinson
- The Remarkable Christmas of the Cobbler's Sons, by Ruth Sawyer, 1994
- Only Opal: The Diary of a Young Girl, based on the diary of Opal Whiteley, 1994
- Eleanor, 1996 – childhood biography of Eleanor Roosevelt
- Basket Moon, by Mary Lyn Ray, 1999 – Cooney's last book
