= Island Boy =

1988 book by Barbara Cooney

First edition (publ. Viking Press)

Island Boy is a 1988 book by Barbara Cooney. It tells the story of a boy named Matthias, who travels around the world but eventually returns to his home on Tibbetts Island in Maine. Cooney described it as being, with Miss Rumphius and Hattie and the Wild Waves, the closest books she has written to her heart; it was her "hymn to Maine".

== Reception ==
The book was praised by Publishers Weekly for its "wide, sweeping seascapes that contrast with the velvety, close-up interiors." PW added that the book "is an ode to simple acts of daily living. Not only one family's tale, this is also a cherishable glimpse of a bygone time." It received a Boston Globe–Horn Book Award.
