= Miss Rumphius =

1982 children's book by Barbara Cooney

- Front cover of Miss Rumphius
- Author: Barbara Cooney
- Illustrator: Barbara Cooney
- Language: English
- Genre: Picture book
- Publisher: Viking Press
- Publication date: November 1982
- Publication place: United States
- Media type: Print (hardcover)
- Pages: 32 pp (first edition)
- ISBN: 978-0-14-050539-9
- OCLC: 12724739
- Dewey Decimal: [E] 19
- LC Class: PZ7.C783 Mi 1985

Miss Rumphius is a children's picture book written and illustrated by Barbara Cooney and originally published by the Viking Press in 1982. It features the life story of fictional Miss Alice Rumphius, a woman who sought a way to make the world more beautiful and found it in planting lupines in the wild. Miss Rumphius was inspired by a real-life "Lupine Lady," Hilda Hamlin, who spread lupine seeds along the Maine coast, as well as Cooney's own experiences traveling the world.

Cooney and William Steig (Doctor De Soto) shared the 1983 National Book Award for Children's Books in the Hardcover Picture Books category. (Note: Picture books were separately recognized for only two years in National Book Awards history, during four years when there were dual hardcover and paperback awards in many categories.) Based on a 2007 online poll, the National Education Association named the book as one of its "Teachers' Top 100 Books for Children." In 2012, it was ranked number 13 among the "Top 100 Picture Books" in a survey published by the School Library Journal. The Lupine Award of the Maine Library Association is named in honor of the book, as is the New Jersey Center for the Book's Miss Rumphius Award given to librarians and teachers who develop creative activities to support literacy education.

== Plot ==
The book opens with the narrator telling readers about a little old woman nicknamed "The Lupine Lady" who "lives in a small house overlooking the sea." The story of her Great Aunt, Miss Rumphius, begins to unfold, starting from when her aunt was just a little girl named Alice. In illustrations depicting the late 1800s, a young Alice lives with her grandparents near a waterfront shipping town. Her grandfather, an immigrant who arrived by boat to America himself, now carves the figureheads for sailing ships in his old age. At night, he regales his granddaughter with stories of exotic places across the sea. Inspired, Alice tells her grandfather that, when she grows up, she will travel to faraway places and settle down by the sea when she grows old, just as he did. He agrees that her plans are "all very well," but goes on to tell her that she must do one more thing: "You must do something to make the world more beautiful." Alice resolves to follow her grandfather's advice, though she is not sure how.

For a time, life goes on normally and, eventually, Alice grows up. She goes to work in a library where people call her Miss Rumphius, and she helps them find books they're looking for. It is in the library where she learns about more faraway places. Time continues to pass, and streaks of gray appear in her hair. In her spare time, she likes to visit the local conservatory where she can linger among the exotic plants and dream of the places from which they originally came. She decides she finally needs to go see those places for herself. Her first trip abroad takes her to Indonesia where she befriends the king of a fishing village. From there, she goes on to climb snowy mountains, trek through jungles, and walk across deserts as she travels to many of the faraway places she promised herself she would go. While traveling in the "Land of the Lotus-Eaters" (Tunisia in North Africa), however, she hurts her back getting off a camel and decides that it's time to find her place by the sea.

After returning to America and settling in a cottage overlooking the water, Miss Rumphius—an older woman now—begins to wonder how she might accomplish the final task her grandfather told her she must do to "make the world more beautiful," but her back injury worsens and, for some time, it is unclear if she will be able to complete the task. As she rests and tries to recover, she reflects on how much she loves the lupines outside her bedroom window, and, after discovering a patch of them farther along the cliffs near her home, she realizes how she can accomplish her third and final goal. She sends off for as many lupine seeds as she can acquire and scatters them all over her community. Her community members seeing this do not understand her actions and question her mental health, but the following spring, it becomes clear she accomplished her goal; her community is bursting with colorful lupines and she has made the world more beautiful.

The story concludes with the young narrator (who we learn is also named Alice) telling readers that her great Aunt Alice is now very old—so old that local children drop by her home to see who they believe is the oldest woman in the world. She tells them stories of her faraway adventures. As in the beginning, the young Alice tells her she would like to see the world when she grows up and "come home to live by the sea." But just as Miss Rumphius' own grandfather did before her, the elder Alice reminds the younger of the third thing she must yet do—"something to make the world more beautiful." And, much like her great-aunt when she was her age, the young narrator admits that she does "not yet know what that can be."

== Important subjects and themes ==
Despite the book having been published some 40 years ago, the story of Miss Rumphius has seen a resurgence of interest in recent years for its socially relevant mores and themes. The most immediate lesson is the ability every individual has to determine what they would like to do with their life and how they can have a powerful, long-lasting impact on their world should they so choose. Additional themes of female independence, singleness, the impact travel can have in teaching about cultural diversity, and the transformative power of beauty as it is portrayed in Miss Rumphius have all been discussed in numerous articles and blogs.

Though not expressly a work of feminist literature, the main character of Miss Rumphius is viewed by many as a brave woman whose independent lifestyle was ahead of her time. Her eagerness to travel the world and seek new horizons on her own would have been unusual in the early 20th century when many women were still marching for equal rights, particularly the right to vote. She would have had to overcome a number of obstacles to go on such adventures alone, but she did.

For the historical eras in which the story is set—roughly the 1880s or 1890s when she is a young girl to about the 1960s or 1970s when she is an old woman—marriage was a common expectation of most women at the time, but the Miss Rumphius in the book never marries. It is clear by the end of her story, however, that she has lived a long, rich life on her own. Not once in the book does she express dissatisfaction with her state of singleness. Where some may refer to Miss Rumphius as a spinster, Cooney does not comment on her marital status and instead depicts her life of singleness as brave and beautiful in its own right. Miss Rumphius even has moments of symbolic motherhood when regaling a room full of children with her adventures at the end of the book. In so doing, Cooney's work inspires many readers—both male and female—to forge on and pursue beauty in their lives, regardless of their circumstances and whether or not they find true love.

Travel also features prominently throughout the story, both in the words and illustrations. The book itself is dedicated with a small illustrated icon to Saint Nicholas, who is the patron saint of children, sailors, and maidens (or unmarried persons), and many of Miss Rumphius' journeys were inspired by Barbara Cooney's own experiences traveling around the world. Cooney's words and illustrations open up readers' imaginations to the possibility of a larger world outside their own, encouraging in them an appreciation for cultural diversity in addition to a sense of wonder for both the present and potential beauty to be discovered, experienced, and created in the world.

For as much as Miss Rumphius is the main character of the book, beauty also plays a central role, both in the illustrations and in the story itself. This is most apparent in the book's central theme which repeatedly encourages readers to "Do something to make the world more beautiful." Cooney's picturesque illustrations—beloved by many readers for their vivid color, attention to whimsy, and their visual aesthetic—reinforce that lesson even further. Themes of beauty are touched on even more subtly in Cooney's portrayal of Miss Rumphius' life itself as beautiful and fulfilling, even (and perhaps more particularly) in its long solitude, reiterating the belief that one can be single and still live a richly satisfying life.

From a conservation standpoint, the plants that were sown by Hilda Hamlin were not Lupinus perennis, native to New England, but instead Lupinus polyphyllus, native to the western United States and which Ms. Hamlin obtained from England. The native Lupinus perennis is now considered extirpated from the state of Maine, and its status is rare, threatened or endangered in the rest of New England.

== Adaptations ==
A film adaptation of Miss Rumphius was made by Spellbound Productions, Inc. and Weston Woods Studios, Inc. in 2000. The film was directed by Sarah Kerruish and narrated by Claire Danes. The film is about 16 minutes long and it is available as a video in Spanish and English. The film received the UNICEF Prize at the 2002 Barcelona International TV and Video Festival as well as a Bronze Plaque at the 2001 Columbus International Film and Video Festival.

== Sources, references, external links, quotations ==
References

- Ortakales, Denise. 2000–2002 Barbara Cooney

Teaching resources based on the book

- Fitzgerald, Alissa. Miss Rumphius. Philosophy for kids. Site accessed 26 October 2006.
- Frey, Carol and Jennifer Meier. ‘Be a Good Citizen with Miss Rumphius: A WebQuest for 2nd-3rd Grade’. Yorkville CUSD, 2001.
- Garthwait, Gail. ‘Miss Rumphius by Barbara Cooney’. Maine Samplers Part 1I. Maine Association of School Libraries. Site accessed 26 October 2006.
- Lovelett, Sandvoss, Schoenberg, and Stoll. Pre-reading activity. Last update 4, January, 2000.
- Liefer, Patricia. ‘Traveling with Miss Rumphius’. Promoting Geographic Knowledge through Literature Workshop, July 7–19, 2002.
- Milks, Cindy and Cheri Jeralds. ‘Teacher CyberGuide: Miss Rumphius’. San Diego County Office of Education, 1998.
- Miyoshi-Miller, Cathi. ‘Children’s book illustration: Miss Rumphius by Barbara Cooney’. 27 March 1999, last update 10 April 1999.
- Web English Teacher. Links to teaching resources based on Miss Rumphius. Last updated 17 October 2005.

Other related websites

- Information about the Miss Rumphius Award
- Interviews with the award winners
- Leu, Donald J. Jr., Rachel A. Karchmer and Deborah Diadiun Leu. The Miss Rumphius Effect: Envisionments for Literacy and Learning That Transform the Internet. Syracuse University, Syracuse, New York, United States, April 1999.

== See also ==
- Seed bombing
- The Man Who Planted Trees
