= The Golden Stallion =

(The) Golden Stallion can refer to:

- The Golden Stallion (1927 film), a 1927 silent film
- The Golden Stallion (1949 film), a 1949 film
- The Golden Stallion, 1951 book by Rutherford George Montgomery
- Golden Stallion of Yennenga, the main film prize awarded by the Panafrican Film and Television Festival of Ouagadougou (FESPACO)
