= Basket Moon =

1999 children's book by Mary Lyn Ray and illustrated by Barbara Cooney

- Front cover, designed by Barbara Cooney
- Author: Mary Lyn Ray
- Illustrator: Barbara Cooney
- Language: English
- Genre: Children's Book
- Publisher: Little, brown and Company
- Publication date: 1999
- Publication place: United States

Basket Moon is a 1999 children's book by Mary Lyn Ray. It was illustrator Barbara Cooney's last children's book, published six months before she died. The book depicts the folk art of basket-making in the Hudson Valley of New York.

== Plot ==
Basket Moon is set in Columbia County, New York. The book details a 19th-century boy who makes baskets and sells them in town, similar to Cooney's earlier book, Ox-Cart Man, which received the 1980 Caldecott Medal. He dreams of selling baskets in the town of Hudson, and finally makes the trip on foot with his father, under the full moon. After their trip, the townspeople mock them for being hillbillies, but the boy's neighbor reminds him of the value and skill of his craft.

== Reception ==
The book was praised by Education Week, which noted Cooney's illustrations for imparting "a strong sense of place," as well as Ray's coming of age story. Kirkus Reviews also praised Ray's "touchingly luminous" story and Cooney's "poetic paintings."
