= Going Down Home with Daddy =

2019 picture book

- Author: Kelly Starling Lyons
- Illustrator: Daniel Minter
- Publisher: Peachtree
- Publication date: April 1, 2019
- Pages: 32
- ISBN: 978-1-56145-938-4

Going Down Home with Daddy is a 2019 picture book written by Kelly Starling Lyons and illustrated by Daniel Minter. It tells the story of a young boy who attends a large family reunion at his great-grandmother's house and struggles to prepare a contribution to the family celebration. Inspired by Lyons's visit to a family gathering in rural Georgia, the book was published by Peachtree Publishing on April 1, 2019. The acrylic illustrations incorporate Adinkra symbols representing various concepts in Ghanaian culture. Critics praised the book's themes of family culture and heritage as well as Minter's illustrations, for which it received a Caldecott Honor in 2020. It also received the 2019 Lupine Award in the Picture Book category.

== Synopsis ==
Alan, a young boy, is excited to travel to his great-grandmother's house for an annual family reunion. He worries, however, that he will not have anything to share at the family's celebration – while his sister and cousins plan to sing a song, read a poem, or present a scrapbook, he has not prepared anything yet. During a tractor ride, Alan's father talks about the fields of cotton that their ancestors planted as slaves, and tells him to think with his heart. The next day, after reflecting on his family's history, Alan has an idea for the celebration. He collects some cotton, a pecan from the pecan trees, and some dirt, and presents a tribute to his family's land and the work of his great-grandparents. The presentation is well-received and when they leave the next morning, Alan is already excited for next year's reunion.

== Background and publication ==
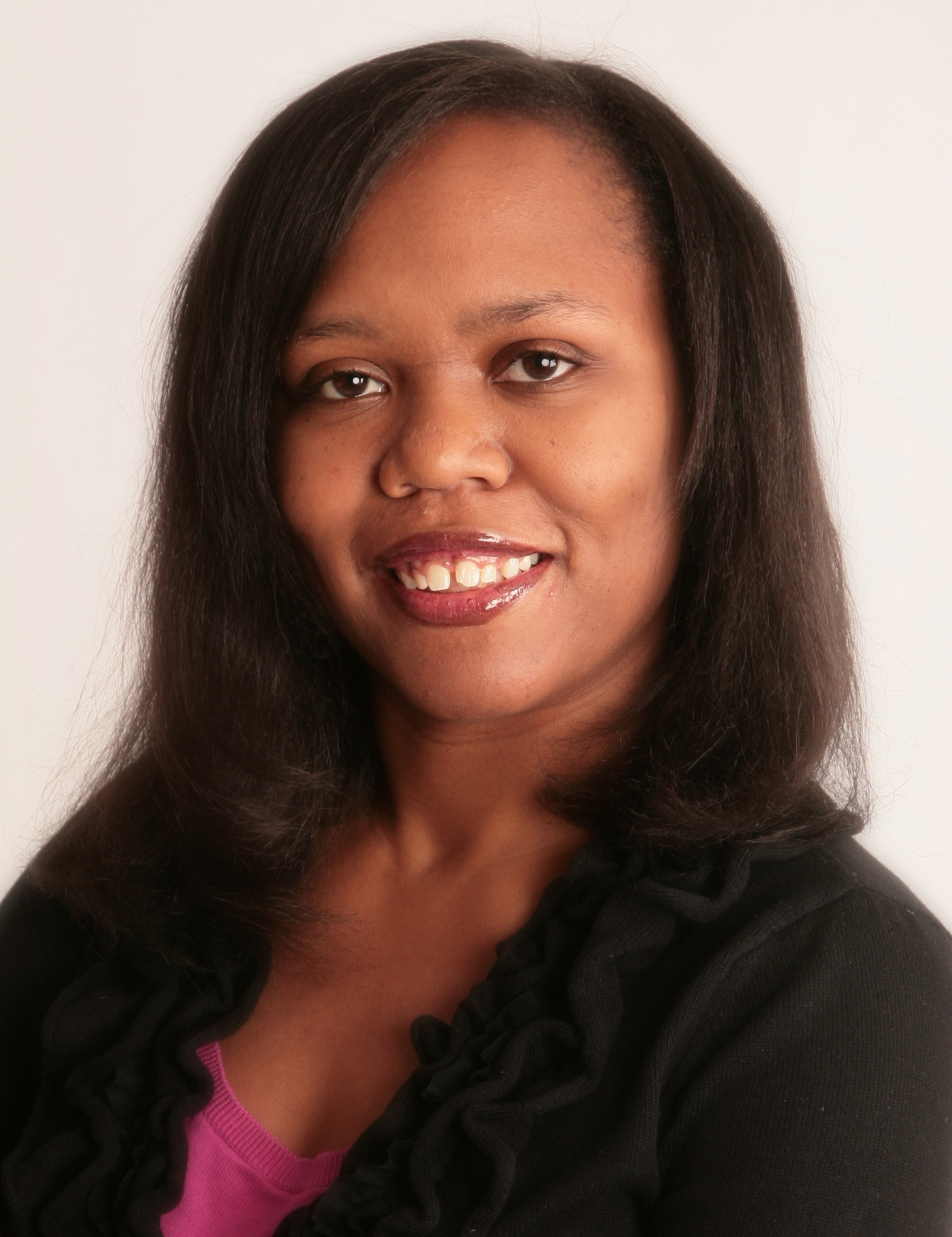
The author, Kelly Starling Lyons, in 2011

In an interview with The Philadelphia Tribune, the author Kelly Starling Lyons said that she decided to write the book after she visited Colquitt, Georgia, for a family gathering at the home of her husband's grandmother. The visit reminded her of family reunions that she attended when she was young, and the book's focus on tradition and heritage was inspired by these gatherings. Lyons said that the character of Alan was based on her own son. She had previously collaborated with the American illustrator Daniel Minter on a 2012 children's book, Ellen's Broom, and she wrote the story with him as the potential illustrator specifically in mind. Though children's book authors typically do not choose the illustrators for their stories, Lyons suggested Minter to Peachtree Publishing for Going Down Home with Daddy, and the publishing company agreed. Minter, a native of Ellaville, Georgia, told The Atlanta Journal-Constitution that his memories of growing up in the small community inspired his illustrations.

The 32-page book was published by Peachtree Publishing on April 1, 2019. An audiobook version, narrated by the voice actor Daxton Edwards, was released by Dreamscape Media in January 2020.

== Writing and illustrations ==
Reviewers described the text of Going Down Home with Daddy as "lyrical" and "joyful". Lyons uses metaphors and imagery to depict Alan's journey and his family's African-American traditions. The story emphasizes themes of family and heritage. Michelle H. Martin, a scholar of children's literature, wrote that the text "employs language that echoes the lives of generations past while it celebrates the here-ness and now-ness of the land's contemporary inhabitants", pointing in particular to the story told by Alan's father on the tractor ride.

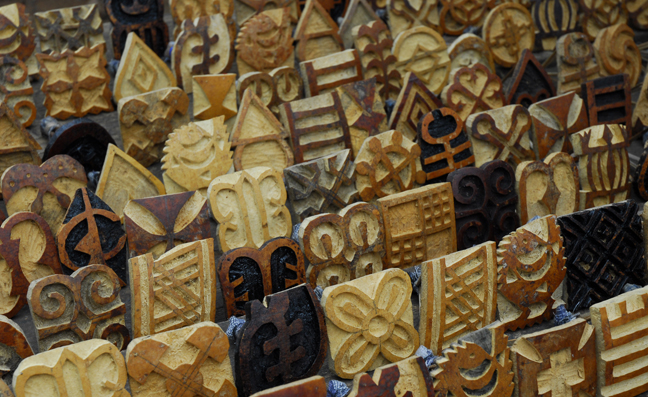
Adinkra stamps carved in Ntonso, Ghana

Minter's acrylic wash illustrations were created by adding thinned acrylic paint to watercolor paper. Adinkra symbols that represent various concepts in Ghanaian culture were incorporated in the image backgrounds throughout the book using large stamps that Minter created. Minter said that he included the Adinkra symbols, which create a layered effect, because "our culture in the South grew out of West African culture". Additional visual symbols in the illustrations that are evocative of Africa include okra and the cowrie shell earrings and cornrows of Alan's great-grandmother. A reviewer for Kirkus Reviews praised one particular illustration with overlapping profiles of Alan, his sister, and his mother, highlighting their common features. In her review, Martin wrote that the layered effect emphasizes the family's collective memory of the history of the land. "Reverent" scenes, such as Alan's speech and memories of his deceased great-grandfather, are painted in shades of blue, while other scenes are painted with more fiery colors. Intricate patterns and textures also recur throughout the illustrations, including on the family members' clothing and on animals.

== Reception and awards ==
The book received starred reviews (reviews marked with a star to denote books of distinction or particularly high quality) from Kirkus Reviews and the School Library Journal. Critics praised the book's focus on family history and culture as well as Minter's acrylic illustrations. In a review for the School Library Journal, Lauren Strohecker described it as a "moving celebration of familial love, history, and tradition", writing that Lyons's text and Minter's illustrations were particularly effective together. A reviewer for Publishers Weekly applauded various elements of the book: its depiction of the struggles of Alan's ancestors, his family's traditions, and his anxiety about his performance for the family celebration. Several reviewers described the book's illustrations as having a dreamlike quality, and Martin wrote in her review that the illustrations unlock "new dimensions of the story" that highlight the family's relationships to each other and to the land. Like Martin, a reviewer for Kirkus Reviews praised the depiction of the family's closeness, calling it a "necessary reminder of the power in families coming together".

In a review of the audiobook, Sharon Grover of AudioFile praised Edwards's "folksy speech pattern and a cadence reminiscent of the rural South" as well as the background music and sound effects of tractors and silverware, but suggested that listeners would also want to have a print copy of the book to view Minter's illustrations. Rosie Camargo, reviewing for Booklist, similarly applauded Edwards's voice as "clear and soothing" and felt that he was a good fit for the character of Alan.

Going Down Home with Daddy received a 2020 Caldecott Honor for Minter's illustrations – the first Caldecott award for a book published by Peachtree. The Caldecott Honor is the runner-up award to the Caldecott Medal and is awarded annually to selected American picture books for children. It was also the recipient of the 2019 Lupine Award in the Picture Book category. The Lupine Award is given annually by the Maine Library Association to a living author or illustrator, either for a book that is set in Maine or to an illustrator or author who was born in or lives in Maine (Minter is based in Maine). The audiobook was a finalist for the 2021 Audie Award for Young Listeners' Title.
