= Alice McLerran =

American anthropologist and author (1933–2019)

- Born: June 24, 1933; West Point, New York, US
- Died: November 17, 2019 (aged 86); Seattle, Washington, US
- Known for: Anthropologist and author
- Notable work: The Mountain that Loved a Bird; Roxaboxen (books)

Alice McLerran (born Alice van Kleek Enderton; 1933–2019) was an American anthropologist and author.

== Biography ==
Alice van Kleek Enderton was born in West Point, New York, on June 24, 1933. Her father, Herbert Enderton, was a Colonel in the U.S. Army. In 1950, the family lived in Quito, Ecuador, where Enderton served as military attaché to the U.S. embassy. While there, McLerran befriended art dealer Luce de Peron and her later husband, painter Oswaldo Guayasamín.

McLerran enrolled at Stanford University in 1951. In 1953, she married Henry Anderson, with whom she had three children: Stephen, David, and Rachel.

In 1961, she enrolled at the University of California, Berkeley, where she finished her undergraduate studies and entered the PhD. program in anthropology. Her advisor was Prof. John Rowe. McLerran's thesis project sought to establish a chronology of pre-Columbian civilizations in the northern highlands of Ecuador. To do this, in 1968–1969 she returned to Ecuador and excavated a number of graves in Carchi Province, recovering and reassembling the pottery, analyzing the pottery styles, and using radiocarbon dating to establish their age.

After finishing her PhD. in 1969, McLerran taught anthropology for three years at the State University of New York, Cortland. In 1973, she moved to Boston where she studied at the Harvard School of Public Health, receiving M.P.H and M.S. degrees in 1974. She worked with Lester Grinspoon on research in psychiatric epidemiology at Massachusetts Mental Hospital.

In 1976, she married Larry D. McLerran, then a physicist postdoc at MIT, whose subsequent career took them to at a number of physics research labs and departments: SLAC, University of Washington, Fermilab, University of Minnesota, Brookhaven National Laboratory, and University of Washington again.

During these travels, McLerran began writing children's books. Her first book, The Mountain that Loved a Bird, was published in 1985. The first edition was illustrated by Eric Carle. It was later published in 24 languages, and with other illustrators. Roxaboxen, illustrated by Barbara Cooney, was published in 1991. It tells the true story of a hill in Yuma, Arizona, where McLerran's mother and her friends created a play town in 1915. As a result of the book, the area was made into a city park in 2000, and an annual Roxaboxen Festival was celebrated.

McLerran died on November 17, 2019, in Seattle.

== Works ==
- "An Archeological Sequence from Carchi, Ecuador". Alice Enderton Francisco. UC Berkeley Dissertations Publishing, 1969. 552 pages.
- The Mountain that Loved a Bird (Picture Book Studio, 1985)
- Secrets (Lothrop, 1990)
- Roxaboxen (Puffin Books, 1991)
- I Want to Go Home (Tambourine Press, 1992)
- Dreamsong (Tambourine Press, 1992)
- Hugs (Cartwheel Press, 1993)
- Kisses (Cartwheel Press, 1993)
- Ghost Dance (Clarion, 1995)
- The Year of the Ranch (Viking Kestrel Picture Books, 1996)
- The Legacy of Roxaboxen (Absey & Co., 1998)
- Dragonfly (Absey & Co., 2000)
