= Kildee House =

1949 novel by Rutherford George Montgomery

- First edition
- Author: Rutherford George Montgomery
- Illustrator: Barbara Cooney
- Language: English
- Genre: Children's literature
- Publisher: Doubleday
- Publication date: 1949
- Publication place: United States
- Pages: 209

Kildee House is a 1949 children's novel written by Rutherford George Montgomery and illustrated by Barbara Cooney. Stonemason Jerome Kildee retires to Northern California, integrating a redwood into the walls. Over time, the house becomes a refuge for wildlife, who soon threaten to overrun the property. The book earned a Newbery Award in 1950.
