= Thomas McGrath (poet) =

American poet (1916–1990)

- Born: Thomas Matthew McGrath; November 20, 1916 near Sheldon, North Dakota, U.S.
- Died: September 20, 1990 (aged 73); Minneapolis, Minnesota, U.S.
- Education: University of North Dakota (BA); Louisiana State University
- Occupations: Poet; screenwriter
- Children: 1

Thomas Matthew McGrath (November 20, 1916 near Sheldon, North Dakota – September 20, 1990, Minneapolis, Minnesota) was a celebrated American poet and screenwriter of documentary films.

McGrath grew up on a farm in Ransom County, North Dakota. He earned a B.A. from the University of North Dakota at Grand Forks. He served in the Aleutian Islands with the U.S. Army Air Forces during World War II. He was awarded a Rhodes Scholarship at Oxford. McGrath also pursued postgraduate studies at Louisiana State University in Baton Rouge. He taught at Colby College in Maine and at Los Angeles State College, from which he was dismissed in connection with his appearance, as an unfriendly witness, before the House Committee on Un-American Activities in 1953. Later he taught at North Dakota State University, and Minnesota State University, Moorhead. McGrath was married three times and had one son, Tomasito, to whom much of the poet's later work was dedicated.

McGrath wrote mainly about his own life and social concerns. His best-known work, Letter to an Imaginary Friend, was published in sections between 1957 and 1985 and as a single poem in 1997 by Copper Canyon Press.

== Works ==
- First Manifesto, A. Swallow (Baton Rouge, LA), 1940.
- "The Dialectics of Love", Alan Swallow, editor, Three Young Poets: Thomas McGrath, William Peterson, James Franklin Lewis, Press of James A. Decker (Prairie City, IL), 1942.
- To Walk a Crooked Mile, Swallow Press (New York City), 1947.
- Longshot O'Leary's Garland of Practical Poesie, International Publishers (New York City), 1949.
- Witness to the Times!, privately printed, 1954.
- Figures from a Double World, Alan Swallow (Denver, CO), 1955.
- The gates of ivory, the gates of horn, Mainstream Publishers, 1957 (2nd edition Another Chicago Press, 1987 ISBN 978-0-9614644-2-4)
- Clouds, Melmont Publishers, 1959
- The Beautiful Things, Vanguard Press, 1960
- Letter to an Imaginary Friend, Part I, Alan Swallow, 1962
  - published with Part II, Swallow Press (Chicago, IL), 1970
  - Parts III and IV, Copper Canyon Press, 1985
  - compilation of all four parts with selected new material, Copper Canyon Press (Port Townsend, WA), 1997. ISBN 978-1-55659-077-1
- New and Selected Poems, Alan Swallow, 1964.
- The Movie at the End of the World: Collected Poems, Swallow Press, 1972.
- Poems for Little People, [Gloucester], c. 1973.
- Voyages to the Inland Sea #3: Essays and poems by R.E. Sebenthal, Thomas McGrath, Robert Dana, Center for Contemporary Poetry, 1973.
- Voices from beyond the Wall, Territorial Press (Moorhead, MN), 1974.
- A Sound of One Hand: Poems, Minnesota Writers Publishing House (St. Peter, MN), 1975.
- Open Songs: Sixty Short Poems, Uzzano (Mount Carroll, IL), 1977. ISBN 978-0-930600-00-6
- Letters to Tomasito, graphics by Randall W. Scholes, Holy Cow! Press (St. Paul, MN), 1977. ISBN 978-0-930100-01-8
- Trinc: Praises II; A Poem, Copper Canyon Press, 1979.
- Waiting for the Angel, Uzzano (Menomonie, WI), 1979. ISBN 9780930600075
- Passages toward the Dark, Copper Canyon Press, 1982. ISBN 978-0-914742-63-0
- Echoes inside the Labyrinth, Thunder's Mouth Press, 1983. ISBN 978-0-938410-13-3
- Longshot O'Leary Counsels Direct Action: Poems, West End Press, 1983. ISBN 978-0-931122-28-6
- Selected Poems, 1938-1988, Copper Canyon Press, 1988. ISBN 978-1-55659-012-2
- This coffin has no handles: a novel, Thunder's Mouth Press, 1988. ISBN 978-0-938410-63-8
- Death Song, edited by Sam Hamill, Copper Canyon Press, 1991. ISBN 9781556590351

=== Anthologies ===
- Ian M. Parsons, editor, Poetry for Pleasure, Doubleday (Garden City, NY), 1960.
- Donald Hall, editor, New Poets of England and America, Meridian, 1962.
- Walter Lowenfels, editor, Poets of Today: A New American Anthology, International Publishers, 1964.
- Lucien Stryk, editor, Heartland: Poets of the Midwest, Northern Illinois University Press (DeKalb, IL), 1967.
- W. Lowenfels, editor, Where Is Vietnam?, Doubleday, 1967.
- Christmas 1968 : 14 poets, Black Rabbit Press, 1968.
- Hayden Carruth, editor, The Voice That Is Great Within Us: American Poetry of the Twentieth Century, Bantam Classics, 1970. ISBN 978-0-5532-6263-6
- Morris Sweetkind, editor, Getting into Poetry, Rostan Holbrook Press, 1972.
- Seymour Yesner, editor, 25 Minnesota Poets , Nodin Press, 1974.
- David Kherdian, editor, Traveling America, Macmillan (New York City), 1977.
- The Norton Introduction to Literature, 2nd edition, Norton (New York City), 1977.
- Robert Bly, ed. (1980). "A Coal Fire in Winter". News of the Universe. San Francisco, CA: Sierra Club. ISBN 978-0-87156-368-2.
- David Ray, editor, From A to Z: 200 Contemporary Poets, Swallow Press, 1981. ISBN 978-0-8040-0370-4
- Herman J. Berlandt, editor, Peace or perish : a crisis anthology, Poets for Peace, 1983.
- Morty Sklar, editor, Editor's Choice II : Fiction, Poetry & Art from the U.S. Small Press : Selections from Nominations Made by Editors of Independent, Noncommercial Literary Presses and Magazines, of Work Published by them from 1978 to 1983, Spirit That Moves Us Press, 1987. ISBN 9780930370237
- Robert Bly, editor, The Rag and Bone Shop of the Heart : Poems for Men , HarperCollins, 1992. ISBN 9780060924201
- Alan Kaufman, editor, The Outlaw Bible of American Poetry, Thunder's Mouth Press, 1999. ISBN 9781560252276
- Estelle Gershgoren Novak, editor, Poets of the Non-existent City : Los Angeles in the McCarthy Era , University of New Mexico Press, 2002. ISBN 9780826329516
- Cary Nelson, editor, "The Oxford Handbook of Modern and Contemporary American Poetry", Oxford University Press, 2012. ISBN 978-0-1953-9877-9

== Reviews ==
Best of all, Letter to an Imaginary Friend licks its fingers and burps at the table. Polite it is not--and the better for it when McGrath turns from his populist vitriol to what may be his most abiding talent: that of bestowing praise--grace, even--on the common, the unruly, the inconsolable, those McGrath chose to side and sing with and for whom "the world is too much but not enough with us.

== Sources ==
- The Revolutionary Poet in the United States: the Poetry of Thomas McGrath, Stern, Frederick C. (Editor), U of Missouri, Columbia, 1988 ISBN 0-8262-0682-4
- Reginald Gibbons; Terrence Des Pres (1987). Thomas McGrath: life and the poem. Northwestern University. (reprint University of Illinois Press, 1992, ISBN 978-0-252-01852-7)
