= Francis Steegmuller =

American novelist

Francis Steegmuller (July 3, 1906 – October 20, 1994) was an American biographer, translator and fiction writer, who was known chiefly as a Flaubert scholar. He sometimes wrote under the pseudonyms of Byron Steel and David Keith.

== Life and career ==
Born in New Haven, Connecticut, Steegmuller graduated from Columbia University in 1927. He contributed numerous short stories and articles to The New Yorker and also wrote under the pseudonyms of Byron Steel and David Keith.

He won two National Book Awards—one in 1971 for Arts and Letters for his biography of Jean Cocteau (Cocteau: A Biography), another in 1981 for Translation for the first volume of Flaubert's selected letters (The Letters of Gustave Flaubert 1830-1857)—and the American Academy of Arts and Letters Gold Medal.

His first wife was Beatrice Stein, a painter who was a pupil and friend of Jacques Villon; she died in 1961. He married the writer Shirley Hazzard in 1963.

Steegmuller's collected papers are held at two universities: at Yale University, the James Jackson Jarves (1818–1888) Papers and the Francis Steegmuller Collection for Jacques Villon; at Columbia University, the Francis Steegmuller Papers 1877–1979.

He died in Naples, Italy.

== Works ==
=== Nonfiction ===
- Sir Francis Bacon: the first modern mind (Garden City, N.Y.: Doubleday, Doran, 1930)
- America on Relief (New York: Harcourt, Brace & Co., 1938 with Marie Dresden Lane)
- Flaubert and Madame Bovary: A Double Portrait (New York: Viking Press, 1939)
- Maupassant: A Lion In The Path (New York: Random House, 1949)
- The Two Lives of James Jackson Jarves (New Haven: Yale University Press, 1951)
- The Grand Mademoiselle (New York: Farrar, Straus and Cudahy, 1956)
- Apollinaire: Poet Among the Painters (New York: Farrar, Straus & Company, 1963)
- Jacques Villon, master printmaker. An exhibition at R.M. Light & Co., Helene C. Seiferheld Gallery inc., New York, February, 1964. (New York: High Grade Press, 1964)
- Cocteau: A Biography (Boston: Atlantic-Little, Brown, 1970)
- Stories and True Stories (Boston: The Atlantic Monthly Press, 1972)
- "Your Isadora": The Love Story of Isadora Duncan & Gordon Craig (New York: Random House, 1974)
- Catherine McNamara, School days remembered : oral history interview with Francis Steegmuller (Oral history project. Friends of the Greenwich Library), (Greenwich, CT: Greenwich Library, 1978)
- A Woman, A Man, And Two Kingdoms: The Story of Madame d'Épinay and the Abbé Galiani (New York: Alfred A. Knopf, Inc., 1991)

=== Translations ===
- Gustave Flaubert, The Selected Letters of Gustave Flaubert (The Great Letters Series) (New York: Farrar, Straus & Young, 1953)
- Gustave Flaubert, Madame Bovary (New York: Random House for the Book of the Month Club, 1957)
- Gustave Flaubert, A Letter from Gustave Flaubert, illustrated by Leonard Baskin (Northampton, MA: Gehenna Press, 1960)
- Edward Lear, Le Hibou et la Poussiquette, Edward Lear's The Owl and the Pussycat freely translated into French, illustrated by Barbara Cooney (Boston: Little, Brown & Co., 1961)
- Charles Augustin Sainte-Beuve, Selected Essays, translated from the French with Norbert Guterman (Garden City, NY: Doubleday & Co., 1963)
- Eugene Field, Papillot, Clignot et Dodo, Eugene Field's Wynken, Blynken, and Nod freely translated into French with Norbert Guterman, illustrated by Barbara Cooney (New York: Ariel Books, 1964)
- Gustave Flaubert, Intimate Notebook 1840-1841 (Garden City, NY: Doubleday & Co., 1967)
- Gustave Flaubert, Flaubert in Egypt: A Sensibility on Tour (Boston: Little, Brown & Co., 1972)
- Gustave Flaubert, The Letters of Gustave Flaubert 1830-1857 (Cambridge: Harvard University Press, 1980)
- Gustave Flaubert, The Letters of Gustave Flaubert, 1857-1880 (Cambridge: Harvard University Press, 1982)
- Gustave Flaubert, George Sand, Flaubert-Sand: The Correspondence, translated with Barbara Bray (London: Harvill, 1993)

=== Novels ===
- O Rare Ben Jonson (New York: Alfred A. Knopf, Inc., 1928 under the name Byron Steel)
- A Matter of Iodine (New York: Dodd, Mead & Co., 1940 under the name David Keith)
- A Matter of Accent (New York: Dodd, Mead & Co., 1943 under the name David Keith)
- States of Grace (New York: Reynal & Hitchcock, 1946)
- The Blue Harpsichord (New York: Dodd, Mead & Co., 1949 under the name David Keith)
- The Christening Party (New York: Farrar, Straus & Cudahy, 1960)
- Silence at Salerno: A comedy of intrigue (New York: Holt, Rinehart and Winston, 1978)

=== Short stories ===
- French Follies and Other Follies: 20 stories from The New Yorker (New York: Reynal & Hitchcock, 1946)

=== Travel books ===
- Java-Java (New York: Alfred A. Knopf, Inc., 1928 under the name Byron Steel)
- Let's Visit Belgium (New York: J. Messner, Inc., 1938)
- The Ancient Shore: Dispatches from Naples (Chicago: University of Chicago Press, 2008) (with Shirley Hazzard)

=== Magazine and newspaper articles ===
- Duchamp: Fifty Years After, Show, February 1963
- An Angel, A Flower, A Bird (profile of Barbette), The New Yorker, September 27, 1969
- "Francis Steegmuller: A Life of Letters." Interview by Lucy Latane Gordon. Wilson Library Bulletin (January, 1992): 62–64, 136.

== Quotations ==
- "I’m told that when Auden died, they found his Oxford [English Dictionary] all but clawed to pieces. That is the way a poet and his dictionary should come out."

== See also ==
- Jacques Barzun
- Barbara Bray
- Ralph Ellison
- Clifton Fadiman
- Norbert Guterman
- Shirley Hazzard
- List of translators
- William Maxwell
- Meyer Shapiro
- Translation
