= Eleanor (picture book) =

1996 children's book by Barbara Cooney

First edition (publ. Viking Press)

Eleanor (1996) is a children's picture book biography of Eleanor Roosevelt's childhood, written by Barbara Cooney, describing her as a shy girl who goes on to do great things.

== Reception ==
A Kirkus Reviews review says: "Paintings reveal the action of a steamship collision; the hectic activity of a park full of children and their governesses; a night full of stars portending the girl's luminous future. The image of plain Eleanor being fitted with her first beautiful dress is an indelible one. Readers will be moved by the unfairness of her early life and rejoice when she finds her place in the world."

A Publishers Weekly review says: "The author/artist focuses on Eleanor's emotional life as a childhood ""ugly duckling"": ""From the beginning the baby was a disappointment to her mother,"" Cooney begins. The tale ends with Eleanor's years at Allenswood, the English boarding school whose gifted headmistress helped transform Eleanor into a confident young woman."

A Reading Teacher review says: "After reading about Eleanor's awkwardness in social settings, children can write about their own feelings in uncomfortable situations."
