= The One Day =

1988 book-length poem by Donald Hall

- First edition
- Author: Donald Hall
- Original title: The One Day
- Published: Mariner Books
- Media type: Print
- Pages: 80
- Awards: National Book Critics Circle Award in Poetry (1988)
- ISBN: 0899198163

The One Day by Donald Hall is a book-length poem. It was included on critic Harold Bloom's list of works constituting the Western Canon.

== Synopsis ==
The book is composed of three parts, "Shrubs Burnt Away," "Four Classic Texts" and "To Build a House", employing a 10-line stanza with variable line length in an experimental form. It centers on mid-life anxiety, using phrases like "a preparation of death." It is not completely dark and despairing, as it focuses on how to make a life worth living, instructing readers to: "Work, love, build a house, and die. But build a house."

== Awards and Acclaim ==
- Winner of the National Book Critics Circle Award in Poetry (1988)
- "Its passion and urgency are rare and remarkable." - The Washington Post
- "...the concept of middle age is explored with fresh insight and expressed in brilliant turns of phrase." - Publishers Weekly.
