= Prophets of Deceit =

1949 book

- Prophets of Deceit (1949), with original dust jacket
- Author: Leo Löwenthal, Norbert Guterman
- Publication date: 1949

Prophets of Deceit (A Study of the Techniques of the American Agitator) is a 1949 book co-written by the German sociologist Leo Löwenthal and the Polish-Jewish scholar Norbert Guterman. The authors analyze and define media appeals specific to American pro-fascist and anti-Semite agitators of the 1940s, such as the application of psychosocial manipulation for political ends. The book details psychological deceits that ideologues or authoritarians commonly used. The techniques are grouped under the headings "Discontent", "The Opponent", "The Movement" and "The Leader".

The authors demonstrate repetitive patterns commonly utilized, such as turning unfocused social discontent towards a targeted enemy. The agitator positions himself as a unifying presence: he is the ideal, the only leader capable of freeing his audience from the perceived enemy. Yet, as the authors demonstrate, he is a shallow person who creates social or racial disharmony, thereby reinforcing that his leadership is needed. The authors believed fascist tendencies in America were at an early stage in the 1940s, but warned a time might come when Americans could and would be "susceptible to ... [the] psychological manipulation" of a rabble rouser.

Prophets of Deceit was published by Harper and Brothers as the first in a multi-volume series edited by Max Horkheimer and Samuel Flowerman for the American Jewish Committee's "Studies in Prejudice Series". It was well received by critics and political analysts, and was considered a valuable contribution to mid-20th century studies of prejudice.

== Background ==
"Studies in Prejudice Series" was a research project to produce a sociological study of prejudice in America in the 1930s and 1940s. The authors were German refugees living in the US, with first-hand experience of the Nazi regime, which imbues their work with a "tremendous vitality and a sense of relevance". During their exile from Germany, while living in Los Angeles, Max Horkheimer and Theodor W. Adorno, both members of the Frankfurt School and working in conjunction with the Institute for Social Research, undertook an expansive research study of what they saw as a shift in spirit, a worldwide movement, which "defined not only mass culture in the United States but also the administrated cultures of the Third Reich and Stalin's Soviet Union."

In 1943 the Institute for Social Research partnered with the American Jewish Committee to investigate American anti-Semitism and publish a multi-volume research study. Horkheimer believed that the scrutiny had to be focused on the agitators, the manipulators, and he thought that in America there was a latent threat of mass anti-Semitism.

Adorno and Löwenthal each conducted research studies of right-wing American radio broadcasts; but Adorno's study was never published. Instead Prophets of Deceit was published as a "scholarly version of the planned popular handbook." It was a psychosocial analysis of a comprehensive study of actual radio speeches and writings of fascists active in the US in the 1930s and 40s.

== Contents ==
The first chapter, ("The Themes of Agitation"), presents samples of an agitator's diatribe, which might be mistaken as "simply ... the raving of a maniac". Generally agitators rely on core motifs, labeled as "Discontent", "The Opponent", "The Movement" and "The Leader".

"Social Malaise", the second chapter, examines how social malaise or discontent can be manipulated by converting perceived problems into grievances. The response to economic grievances is to say that "too much help is being extended to foreign nations”, that not only are "foreigners taking our money, they also threaten our jobs". Political grievances are addressed by the call to action against international "commitments by the United States government [that] jeopardize political liberties." Media outlets are the source of cultural grievances, and labeled "the enemies of the nation", while other enemies are depicted as morally lax, "a crowd of Marxists, refugees, [and] left-wing internationalists."

The outer world is painted as hostile and filled with enemies in the third chapter ("A Hostile World"). The agitator positions himself as "a bone fide advocate of social change", but in doing so intentionally ”crystallizes and hardens these feelings” of hostility. The remedy is his supposed superior knowledge, which he offers as a shield. He convinces his audience that it needs his guidance because they are victims, cheated by a "comprehensive and carefully planned political conspiracy". He offers himself "a champion of democracy and Christianity", and as the only person who will solve grievances.

Chapter IV, ("The Ruthless Enemy"), outlines how a political enemy, deemed responsible for the audience's suffering, is necessary to the agitator. The enemy is cast as evil, "an alien body in society which has no useful productive function." The next chapter ("The Helpless Enemy”) exposes the ways the enemy is vilified, portrayed as a criminal, degenerate, a low animal, concepts meant to instill loathing. A specific enemy is identified, such as Jews (Chapter VI ("The Enemy as Jew"), though the agitator does not stop there, but frequently "denounces communists, plutocrats, refugees without qualification." A convoluted argument is put forth that Jews are persecuted because they deserve persecution, and furthermore that Jews are the persecutors. Antisemitism is disavowed as the agitator claims to be "a friend of the Jews." Having provided his own definition for the causes of the social malaise, "as a would be leader of a popular movement" he sets goals for improvement in Chapter VII ("A Home for the Homeless"); however his solutions are found to be empty promises. His political or economic goals are motivated by little more than a desire "go one better than the government, his most dangerous competitor."

Followers are provided neither with hope nor positive ideas for change; agitation is historically distinguished by a complete lack of positive change. Chapter VIII ("The Follower") explains that adherents are made to believe the enemy will only be vanquished through means of a movement and by following the leader's dictates. External forces said to threaten American society are emphasized. The size of the movement is quantified, with claims that it consists "75% of the American people". In Chapter IX ("The Leader") he positions himself as someone with special skills, whose interests support theirs, someone who is "one of the plain folk ... yet far above them." Unlike Hitler or Mussolini, who broke with society and abandoned democratic, Chapter X ("Self-Portrait of the Agitator") shows how the American agitator "dares not repudiate established morality and democratic values". Yet the themes, as exposed in the book, do "not prevent him from conveying the principal social tenets of totalitarianism."

In the closing chapter ("What the Listener Heard"), the authors discuss the listener's reactions. They view them as generally drawn to the idea of success, while against "bureaucrats, Jews, congressmen, plutocrats, communists ... He grumbles against the foreigners who come to this country and get good jobs." Löwenthal and Guterman emphasize that American agitators have historically failed to gain traction and are usually marginalized. They warn, however, that under certain circumstances, such as loss of security for the middle class, America should contemplate the "possibility in which a situation will arise in which large numbers of people would be susceptible to his psychological manipulation".

== Analysis ==
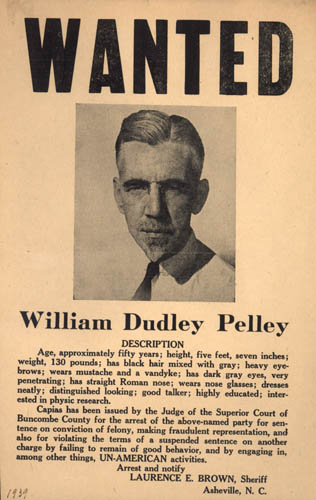
William Dudley Pelley in 1939

Löwenthal and Guterman examined the latent content of the political agitator's speeches and writings, treating and examining them more comprehensively than any other work of the period. They found that agitators typically employ 21 common tactics in their speeches, such as characterizing the enemy as a low animal (i.e. vermin), or building up an image of a folksy "chosen leader who responds to an inner call." They explain the successes of mid-20th century demagogues such as Gerald L. K. Smith, Carl H. Mote, William Dudley Pelley, Joe McWilliams, and Charles Coughlin. The authors' purpose was subject appeal of these messages to a thorough analysis, to inoculate future generations of Americans against demagogues and ideologues – the "prophets of deceit".

The authors define the difference between the goals of an agitator, revolutionary and reformer. The latter seeks social change and has a clear vision of his goals. An agitator seeks rejection of the status quo and instills intolerance against groups or individuals. An agitator presents himself as an advocate for social change with the purpose of defeating the underlying causes of discontent, builds a movement and proclaims himself its leader; he is "in fact, full of reactionary cliches about 'the good old days' and the 'simple American Way which our ancestors loved'." Yet the agitator fails to analyze causes of discontent, but "seems to require only the willingness to relinquish inhibition ... No resentment is too small for the agitator's attention."

Löwenthal and Guterman theorize that right-wing agitation increases social dissatisfaction, while simultaneously hampering rational responses to it. Much of the basis of pro-fascist and antisemitic propaganda appears to be irrational in substance, yet Löwenthal's research revealed that it was planned and calculated to achieve a specific response. Paul Apostolidos writes that Prophets in Deceit "precisely catalogues the techniques used by the agitator to promote irrationalism in his audience." Pro-fascist sentiment in America in the 1940s was not spontaneous, more grounded on long held beliefs, which Löwenthal labeled social malaise.

The authors explain the methods the Christian right use to capitalize on advantage of widespread social malaise. They sow "the suspicion that mysterious social powers are penetrating a 'hoax' on the majority of the people and depriving them of society's fruits". These suspicions create a widespread feeling of helplessness, disillusionment, and fear of disaster. According to Löwenthal and Guterman, the social discontent is real, it "reflects the stresses imposed on the individual by the profound transformations taking place in our economic and social structure – the replacement of the class of small independent producers by gigantic industrial bureaucracies, the decay of the patriarchal family, the breakdown of primary personal ties between individuals in an increasingly mechanized world … the substitution of mass culture for traditional patterns." A political agitator will manipulate existing social discontent, distortion the underlying causes, with in turn results in irrational responses and actions. The agitator will trick and mislead his audience, then through "the guise of protest against the oppressive situation, the agitator binds the audience to it .... The agitator does not create the malaise, but he aggravates and fixates it because he bars the path to overcoming it." Christian right agitation is sophisticated trickery, which cannot and will not provide solutions to the public, but will only cause a "despairing obsession with its own suffering."

Often the message is contradictory and nonsensical, yet based on psychological manipulation. To the majority he "may sound crazy, but he knows, with a knowledge that is largely intuitive, precisely what he is doing. He kindles fury and fear in his audience, yet keeps them in check, reminding them that they "are still weak and can free themselves from the enemy's tyranny only be submitting unconditionally to his leadership." Löwenthal and Guterman demonstrate Adorno's belief that the greatest danger to American democracy is manipulation of mass culture: radio, television, and film. The authors feared a time when an American audience could be manipulated via similar techniques and psychological means.

== Reception and legacy ==
The volume was well received on publication. The New York Times, in 1949, wrote that it is "beyond all doubt the most illuminating study of the techniques and the propaganda of the native American Fascist which has yet appeared." The American Journal of Sociology's review, written by Wrong, mentions that the study falters in its attempt to find exact parallels between America and European fascist dictators, but its value "to American social scientists is not the least of its virtues". Alfred McClung Lee wrote in his review in Public Opinion Quarterly that the "Studies in Prejudice Series" promised to be valuable in the study of intergroup relationships and prejudice, and that "Lowethal and Guterman especially deserve praise for a wise and significant volume". Harvard lecturer Charles Clavey believes the book offers the most striking insights into current illiberal movements such as Trumpism.
