= Sarah Kerruish =

Manx film producer

Sarah Kerruish is a Manx documentary director, producer and writer based in London.

== Early life and education ==
Kerruish grew up in Ballasalla, Isle of Man. Kerruish attended Ballasalla Primary School and Castle Rushen High School. She won the Ella Olesen scholarship to study at the University of Idaho, before moving back to London.

== Career ==
In 1994, Kerruish was part of the team that created the documentary series Moon Shot, which won the Peabody Award and a Primetime Emmy nomination. In 1998, she directed the documentary, Dreams Spoken Here, about deaf children learning to speak. She created a short film about the technical team in the White House during their last few days under the administration of Barack Obama. In 2018, she co-directed the documentary General Magic with Matt Maude, about the start-up company, General Magic, that was founded in 1989. Kerruish recorded footage at the company in 1992 for a promotional video, which was used in the documentary.

== Personal life ==
Kerruish lives in London.

== Filmography ==
Year	Title	Role
1994	Moon Shot	Writer
1998	Dreams Spoken Here	Director
2000	Miss Rumphius	Producer
2018	General Magic	Director, writer, producer
