= Doctor De Soto =

1982 picture book by William Steig

- Front cover of unknown edition, designed by William Steig
- Author: William Steig
- Illustrator: William Steig
- Language: English
- Genre: Children's literature
- Publisher: Farrar, Straus and Giroux/Macmillian Publishers
- Publication date: 1982
- Publication place: United States
- Media type: Print
- Pages: 32 pp
- ISBN: 0-374-41810-1

Doctor De Soto is a picture book for children written and illustrated by William Steig and first published in 1982. It features a mouse dentist who must help a fox with a toothache without being eaten.

Steig and his book won the 1983 National Book Award for Children's Books in category Picture Books, Hardcover, as did Barbara Cooney for Miss Rumphius. (Note: Picture books were separately recognized for only two years in National Book Awards history, during four years when there were dual hardcover and paperback awards in many categories.)

Doctor De Soto was also recognized as a Newbery Honor Book. At 32 pages, it is one of the shortest to be honored in that awards program.

== Plot ==
The story is about Dr. De Soto, a mouse dentist who lives in a world of anthropomorphic animals. He and his wife, who serves as his assistant, work together to treat patients with as little pain as possible. Dr. De Soto uses different chairs, depending on the size of the animal, or simply has the patient sit on the floor, using a stepladder or with Mrs. De Soto guiding her husband with a system of pulleys for treating extra-large animals. They refuse to treat any animal who likes to eat mice.

One day, a well-dressed fox with a toothache drops by and begs for treatment. Dr. De Soto feels pity for the fox and Mrs. De Soto suggests they risk it, so they admit the fox as a patient. They give the fox some anesthetic and proceed to treat the bad tooth. While under anesthesia, however, the fox unknowingly exclaims how he loves to eat mice (including with a dry, white wine). The De Sotos remove the bad tooth, and tell the fox to come back the next day to get a false tooth. On his way home, the fox notes that it is crass to try to eat the creature that had just relieved him of much pain, but still doesn't dismiss the idea. Later that night, Dr. and Mrs. De Soto, as she prepares the new tooth of gold, debate whether to readmit the fox. Dr. De Soto feels it was foolish to trust a fox, but Mrs. De Soto says she thinks the fox was reacting to the anesthetic in his comments. In the end Dr. De Soto vows, as his father taught him, to finish the job he started, but they formulate a plan to protect themselves.

The next day, the fox returns; he is much happier, out of pain, and anxiously awaits the installation of his new tooth. Dr. De Soto puts in the new tooth, but by now the fox has decided to give in to temptation and eat them. Dr. De Soto then introduces a new formula the couple created recently, and claiming that one application will prevent toothaches forever, asks the fox if he would like to be the first to try it. The fox, who hates pain, readily agrees. The dentist takes his time and paints each tooth with the formula, then has the patient clench his jaws shut for a full minute. The fox is surprised to find that his mouth has been glued shut, as this is what the secret formula really is, but Dr. De Soto states that he "should have mentioned" that the formula needs time to permeate the dentin and as a result, the fox will not be able to open his mouth for a day or two. Stunned, the deceived patient can only reply with 'frank oo berry mush' and in a daze, leave with as much dignity as possible.

The book ends with the De Sotos triumphant at having "outfoxed the fox", and they take the rest of the day off.

The plot of the book bears many similarities to a fable by Aesop regarding a wolf and a crane; in both stories, a predator has trouble with their mouth or throat, and requires the aid of another animal to place themselves inside the jaws of the beast. In the original fable, the wolf simply decides that letting the crane live is reward enough, and the crane goes without payment. In this story, the fox decides to eat the protagonist but is ultimately outsmarted.

== Adaptation ==
An animated short of Doctor De Soto was directed in 1984 by American animator Michael Sporn for Weston Woods Studios. It was nominated for the Academy Award for Best Animated Short Film. The film adaptation of this book also received the CINE Golden Eagle Award in Education.
