= Seven Spools of Thread =

Seven Spools of Thread: A Kwanzaa Story
- Author: Angela Shelf Medearis
- Language: English
- Genre: Picture book
- Published: 2000
- Publisher: Albert Whitman and Company
- ISBN: 9780807573150

Seven Spools of Thread: A Kwanzaa Story is a picture book published in 2000 and written by Angela Shelf Medearis with illustrations by Daniel Minter. The book tells the story of seven Ashanti brothers who must learn to work together, while also demonstrating the seven principles of Kwanzaa.

== About ==
Seven Spools of Thread follows the story of seven Ashanti brothers who constantly fight, argue and bicker with one another. When their father dies, he leaves them with the instructions to make gold out of differently-colored spools of silk thread by sundown, or they will have to leave their home. The sons are able to work together in the end and learn to weave multi-colored cloth together that they sell for gold. Later, they teach others how to make the cloth and the economy of the town prospers by selling fabric. The story itself is also an origin story for the creation of Kente cloth, as imagined by the author, Angela Shelf Medearis.

The seven principles of Kwanzaa are woven subtly through the story and explained more thoroughly in Medearis' author's note. In addition to information about Kwanzaa, Medearis also describes West African cloth weaving at the end of the book and includes instructions for making a belt. The art in the story was created using linoleum-block printing and is bright and bold.

== Reception ==
Kirkus Review wrote that the books is "beautifully designed," and that the story is "satisfying." Publishers Weekly called the book "an entertaining story."

Seven Spools has also been reviewed by Horn Book Guide Reviews, Booklist, and the Chicago Tribune.
