= Norbert Guterman =

American translator (1900–1984)

Norbert Guterman (1900–1984) was a scholar, and translator of scholarly and literary works from French, German, Polish, Yiddish, and Latin into English.

Born in Warsaw, Poland, Guterman attended the University of Warsaw, where he studied psychology. He moved to Paris to study at the Sorbonne, where he continued his studies in psychology, receiving degrees in 1922 and 1923.

In the 1930s, Guterman worked closely with French Marxist theorist Henri Lefebvre in popularizing the Marxist notions of alienation and mystification. He published translations of Marx's early works, which were often the first publications of these works in any language.

Guterman, who was Jewish, moved to the United States in 1933, where he took on translation work for the Monthly Review, eventually becoming an editor. He later became interested in Hassidic Judaism, though it is not clear if he became observant or was a hasid of a specific rebbe. In 1936 he became an associate member of the Institute for Social Research on the recommendation of Max Horkheimer who held a great deal of respect for him. In 1949 he co-published Prophets of Deceit with Leo Löwenthal.

His papers are kept in the Butler Library of Columbia University.

== Select list of translations ==
- Max Raphael, Prehistoric Cave Paintings, New York, Pantheon, 1945
- Bella Chagall, Burning Lights, illustrated by Marc Chagall, New York, Schocken Books, 1946.
- Kazimierz Wierzyński, The Life and Death of Chopin, foreword by Arthur Rubinstein, New York, Simon and Schuster, 1949.
- Sainte-Beuve, Selected Essays, translated from the French with Francis Steegmuller, Garden City, Doubleday & Co., 1963
- Eugene Field, Papillot, Clignot et Dodo, Eugene Field's Wynken, Blynken, and Nod freely translated into French with Francis Steegmuller, illustrated by Barbara Cooney, New York, Ariel Books, 1964
- Norbert Guterman, A Book of French Quotations with English Translations, New York, Doubleday, 1965.
- F.W.J. Schelling, On University Studies, Ohio University Press, 1966.
- Kazimierz Michałowski, Art of Ancient Egypt, translated and adapted from the Polish and the French, New York, Harry N. Abrams, 1968.
- Henri Lefebvre, The Sociology of Marx, New York, Pantheon Books, 1968.
- Leszek Kołakowski, The Alienation of Reason: A History of Positivist Thought, Anchor, 1969. Subsequently reissued as Positivist Philosophy from Hume to the Vienna Circle.
- Paracelsus, Selected Writings, edited by Jolande Jacobi, 2nd, rev. ed., Princeton University Press, 1973.
- Russian Fairy Tales, collected by Alexander Afanasyev, Pantheon, 1976.
- Norbert Guterman, compiler, The Anchor Book of Latin Quotations, Anchor, reprint ed., 1990.
- Marek Hłasko, The Eighth Day of the Week, reprint ed., Northwestern University Press, 1994.
