= Ox-Cart Man =

1979 picture book by Donald Hall

- Author: Donald Hall
- Illustrator: Barbara Cooney
- Genre: Children's picture book
- Publisher: Viking Press
- Publication date: 1979
- Publication place: United States
- ISBN: 978-0-670-53328-2
- OCLC: 4883766
- Dewey Decimal: [E] 19
- LC Class: PZ7.H14115 Ox

Ox-Cart Man is a 1979 children's book written by Donald Hall and illustrated by Barbara Cooney. It won the 1980 Caldecott Medal. The book tells of the life and work of an early 19th-century farming family in New Hampshire. The father uses an ox-cart to take their goods to market in Portsmouth, where they make the money to buy the things they need for the next year. Even the ox and cart are sold.

Hall originally published "Ox-Cart Man" as a poem in the October 17, 1977 issue of The New Yorker. Hall revised the poem greatly to create the children's book and chose Barbara Cooney for its illustrations. Cooney had already illustrated another Caldecott Medal-winning book, Chanticleer and the Fox. Both the earlier version of the poem and the book are cyclical in narrative and theme.

This book was featured on a Season 2 episode of Reading Rainbow.

Awards
Preceded by The Girl Who Loved Wild Horses	Caldecott Medal recipient 1980	Succeeded by Fables
