= Kelly Starling Lyons =

American author

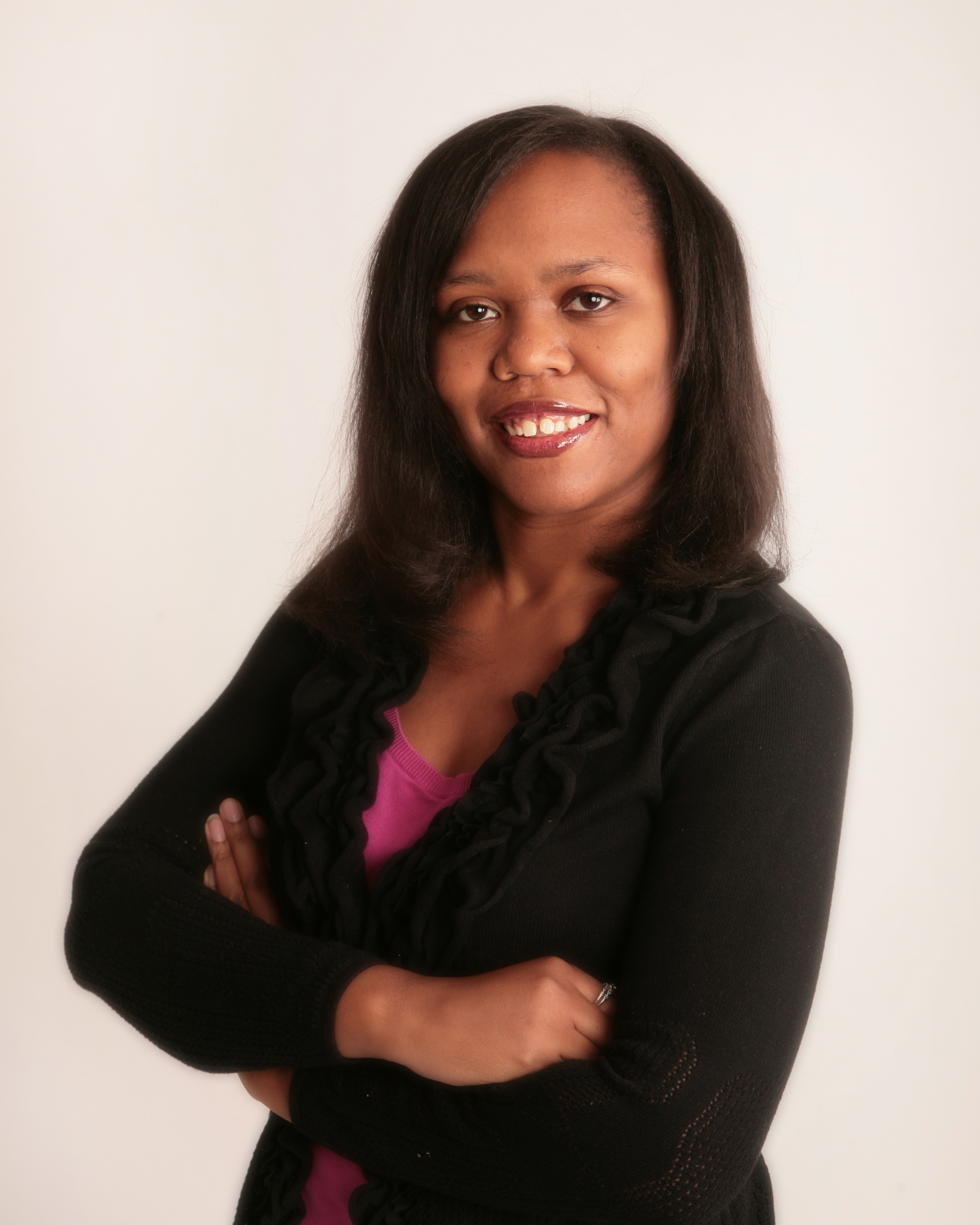
- Born: Pittsburgh, Pennsylvania, U.S.
- Occupation: Children's book author
- Website: www.kellystarlinglyons.com

Kelly Starling Lyons is an American writer and children's book author. She is also one of the founding members of the blog The Brown Bookshelf, which raises awareness of Black children's book creators and features author and illustrator spotlights.

== Personal ==
Lyons was born in Pittsburgh, Pennsylvania. As a high-school student, Lyons loved the works of Richard Wright, Ralph Ellison and Lorraine Hansberry and set a goal to be an author.

As an adult, she read the book Something Beautiful by Sharon Dennis Wyeth, which was the first time she had seen an African-American girl featured on the cover of a picture book. This inspired her to start writing fiction books for children that would feature African-American lead characters.

Lyons makes her home in Raleigh, North Carolina.

Lyons attended Syracuse University, where she earned a B.A. in African-American Studies, as well as her M.S. in Magazine Journalism. She has since worked for Ebony Magazine, The News & Observer, and the Syracuse Herald-Journal.

== Awards and honors ==
Three of Lyon's books are Junior Library Guild selections: Ellen's Broom (2012), Dream Builder: The Story of Architect Philip Freelon (2020), and Miles Lewis: King of the Ice (2022).

Awards for Lyons's writing
| Year | Title | Award | Result | Ref. |
|---|---|---|---|---|
| 2013 | Ellen's Broom | Coretta Scott King Award | Honor | |
| 2020 | Going Down Home with Daddy | ALSC Notable Children's Books | Selection | |
| 2020 | Going Down Home with Daddy | Caldecott Medal | Honor | |
| 2020 | Sing a Song: How “Lift Every Voice and Sing” Inspired Generations | ALSC Notable Children's Books | Selection | |
| 2020 | Ty's Travels: All Aboard! | Cybils Award for Easy Readers | Finalist | |
| 2021 | Going Down Home with Daddy | ALSC Notable Children's Recordings | Selection | |
| 2021 | Ty’s Travels: Zip, Zoom! | Geisel Award | Honor | |
| 2021 | Ty’s Travels: Zip, Zoom! | ALSC Notable Children's Books | Selection | |

== Selected texts ==
Lyons has written more than a dozen books for children that focus on aspects of African-American history and culture, including:

- A Girl Named Misty, The True Story of Misty Copeland, this book tells the story of how young Misty Copeland began to dance, eventually becoming the first African-American principal dancer in American Ballet Theatre.
- NEATE: Eddie’s Ordeal, a title in their NEATE chapter book series, tells the story of relationship between a 13-year-old African-American boy who loves to play basketball and his civil rights veteran dad.
- One Million Men and Me was published by Just Us Books in 2007. Illustrated by Peter Ambush, it was inspired by her memories of attending the Million Man March.
- Hope's Gift, illustrated by Don Tate, celebrates the 150th anniversary of the Emancipation Proclamation.
- Tea Cakes for Tosh was illustrated by E. B. Lewis.
- Ellen’s Broom, illustrated by Daniel Minter, was inspired by a document that the author saw while researching family history in Rockingham County, NC and Henry County, VA.
- Going Down Home with Daddy (2019), illustrated by Daniel Minter
