= New Poets of England and America =

1957 poetry anthology

- First edition
- Editors: Donald Hall, Robert Pack, Louis Simpson
- Language: English
- Genre: poetry anthology
- Publisher: Meridian Books
- Publication date: 1957
- Publication place: United States
- Pages: 351
- OCLC: 15719820
- Followed by: New Poets of England and America: Second Selection (1962)

New Poets of England and America is a poetry anthology edited by Donald Hall, Robert Pack and Louis Simpson, and published in 1957. The Introduction was written by Robert Frost. The collection met with success and went through ten printings over the next decade. In 1962, Hall and Pack came out with a revised edition titled New Poets of England and America: Second Selection.

== History ==
To spotlight the rising generation of English and American poets, Hall, Pack, and Simpson only featured contributors who were aged 40 or younger as of 1957. They chose poems from 52 different poets, including several poems written by themselves. The selections in the anthology embodied "the best of the Academic Poets, so called because many of them held teaching posts at colleges and universities but, more important, because of the button-down formalism of their verse."

In The Sewanee Review literary magazine, American poet James Dickey gave the anthology tepid praise: "Though its inclusions and exclusions are questionable in many cases, most of these poets have every right to admission, being as well as any others representative of a generation that has as yet exhibited very little passion, urgency, or imagination." His depiction of New Poets of England and America as staid and unadventurous was an image that would become the critical consensus.

Soon after the book's publication, the Beats burst into prominence and challenged conventional notions of American literature. In 1960, Donald Allen edited a groundbreaking anthology, The New American Poetry 1945-1960. It emphasized the avant-garde work being produced in the U.S.—by the Beats, Black Mountain poets, San Francisco Renaissance poets, and New York School poets—and did not feature a single American poet who also appeared in New Poets of England and America. Allen wrote in his Preface that a common characteristic of the poetry he selected was "a total rejection of all those qualities typical of academic verse."

A rivalry of sorts sprang up between the two anthologies. Literary critics would later refer to it as the "Anthology Wars". In 1961, Donald Hall published a combative essay, "The Battle of the Bards", that offered his perspective on the opposing poetic styles. He contrasted the polished, traditional verse in New Poets of England and America with the boundary-pushing approach on display in Allen's book, an approach which Hall alleged had an element of anti-intellectualism.

In 1962, Hall and Pack issued a revised edition that added Ted Hughes and Charles Tomlinson among the English poets, and Sylvia Plath and Anne Sexton among the Americans, while still adhering to the 40-or-under age requirement. The two editors also wrote separate Introductions in which they defended their choices and their criteria for excellent contemporary poetry. In his Introduction to the anthology's English poets, Hall urged American readers to overcome what he viewed as a reflexive Anglophobia that prevented appreciation of new work coming out of England.

In his Introduction to the American poets, Pack was more confrontational, claiming that the U.S. poetry scene in the early 1960s had become divided into "two camps, the Academics and the Beats". He said that popular appeal favored the latter because "gossip is more interesting than poetry.... A poet is interesting to the public...if he drinks himself to death, if he undresses at a poetry reading, or if he takes part in a presidential inauguration, but not for what his poems say or for their quality." He then argued against the perception that the works included in New Poets of England and America were old-fashioned or dull: "The poems in this anthology are characterized first by their variety, in subject, outlook, and style", and exhibit "experimentation with form". He predicted "the careful reader will be astounded by the diversity of voices, of tight and of free forms that these poets have found", adding that the dismissal of "non-Beat poets" for their "tameness and uniformity" was "a result of ignorance or of the failure to read with care".

== Poets in New Poets of England and America (1957) ==
Kingsley Amis - William Bell - Robert Bly - Philip Booth - Edgar Bowers - Charles Causley - Henri Coulette - Donald Davie - Catherine Davis - Keith Douglas - Donald Finkel - W. S. Graham - Charles Gullans - Thom Gunn - Donald Hall - Michael Hamburger - Elizabeth R. Harrod - John Heath-Stubbs - Anthony Hecht - Geoffrey Hill - John Hollander - John Holloway - Elizabeth Jennings - Donald Justice - Ellen de Young Kay - Melvin Walker La Follette - Joseph Langland - Philip Larkin - Robert Layzer - Robert Lowell - William Matchett - Thomas McGrath - William Meredith - James Merrill - W. S. Merwin - Robert Mezey - Vassar Miller - Howard Moss - Howard Nemerov - Robert Pack - Alastair Reid - Adrienne Cecile Rich - Jon Silkin - Louis Simpson - William Jay Smith - W. D. Snodgrass - May Swenson - Wesley Trimpi - Jon Manchip White - Reed Whittemore - Richard Wilbur - James Wright

== See also ==
- 1957 in poetry
- 20th century in poetry
- American literature
- English literature
- List of poetry anthologies
- The New American Poetry 1945–1960
