= Matt Tavares =

American writer

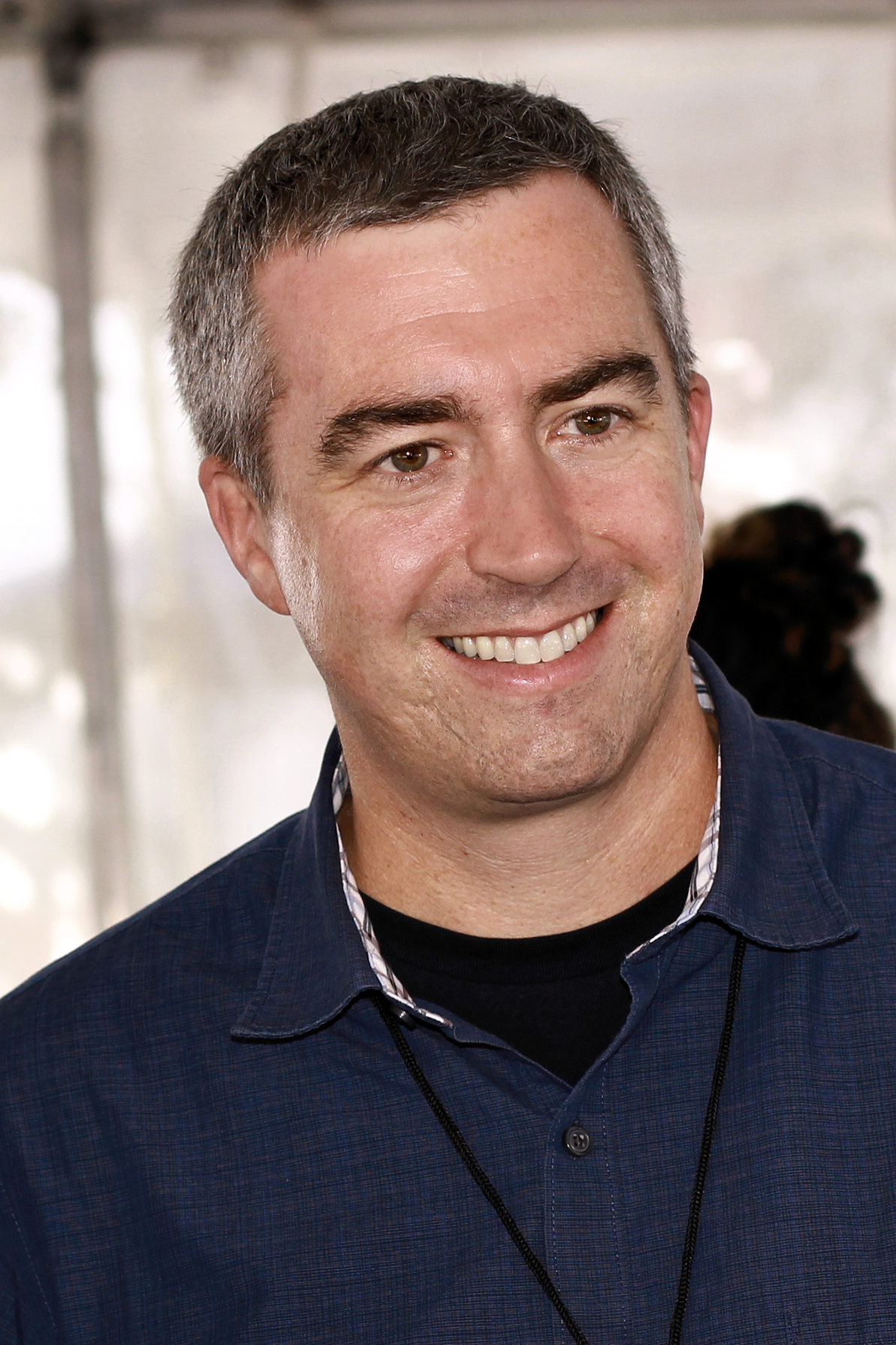
Tavares at the 2019 Texas Book Festival.

Matthew Manuel Tavares (born December 4, 1975) is an American illustrator and writer of children's picture books.

== Biography ==
Tavares was born in Boston. During his childhood, his mother read to him every night and his family often visited the local library. He majored in studio art at Bates College.

As his senior thesis at Bates, Tavares wrote and illustrated "Sebastian's Ball", a story about a boy who catches a magical foul ball at a Boston Red Sox game. Three years later in 2000, after much revision, it became his first published picture book, Zachary's Ball from Candlewick Press. Zachary's Ball went on to win a Massachusetts Book Award Honor and to be named one of "40 Classic New England Children's Books" by Yankee Magazine.

At least 20 more books illustrated by Tavares have been published since then, including several for which he has written the text. They have won several awards including three Parents' Choice Gold Awards. His artwork has been exhibited at the Museum of American Illustration, the Brandywine River Museum, and the Mazza Museum of Picture Book Art.

When not working in his studio, Tavares travels the country speaking and drawing at schools, libraries, conferences, and bookstores. He has presented at the Smithsonian American Art Museum, the Eric Carle Museum, and the White House Easter Egg Roll, and has done book signings at Fenway Park.

Tavares lives in Maine with his wife and two daughters.

== Published books ==
Where no writer is named, Tavares is the writer as well as the illustrator.

- Zachary's Ball (Candlewick Press, 2000)
- 'Twas the Night Before Christmas, or Account of A Visit from St. Nicholas, Anonymous, 1823 (Candlewick, 2002)
- Oliver's Game (Candlewick, 2004)
- Mudball (Candlewick, 2005)
- Jack and the Beanstalk, by E. Nesbit, 1908 (Candlewick, 2006)
- Iron Hans: A Grimm's Fairy Tale, retold by Stephen Mitchell (Candlewick, 2007)
- Lady Liberty: A Biography, by Doreen Rappaport (Candlewick, 2008)
- The Gingerbread Pirates, by Kristen Kladstrup (Candlewick, 2009)
- Henry Aaron's Dream (Candlewick, 2010)
- Jack's Path of Courage: The Life of John F. Kennedy, by Doreen Rappaport (Disney-Hyperion, 2010)
- Over the River and Through the Wood: The New England Boy's Song about Thanksgiving Day, by Lydia Maria Child, 1848 (Candlewick, 2011)
- There Goes Ted Williams: The Greatest Hitter Who Ever Lived (Candlewick, 2012)
- Helen's Big World: The Life of Helen Keller, by Doreen Rappaport (Disney-Hyperion, 2012)
- Becoming Babe Ruth (Candlewick, 2013)
- Jubilee: One Man's Big, Bold and Very, Very Loud Celebration of Peace, by Alicia Potter (Candlewick, 2014) – about P. S. Gilmore
- Growing Up Pedro (Candlewick, 2015) – about Pedro Martínez
- Crossing Niagara: The Death-Defying Tightrope Adventures of the Great Blondin (Candlewick, 2016)
- Lighter Than Air: Sophie Blanchard, the First Woman Pilot , by Matthew Clark Smith (Candlewick, 2017)
- Red & Lulu (Candlewick, 2017)
- Dasher (Candlewick, 2019)
- A Ben of All Trades, by Michael J. Rosen (Candlewick, 2020)
- Twenty-One Steps: Guarding the Tomb of the Unknown Soldier, by Jeff Gottesfeld (Candlewick, 2021
- Hoops: A Graphic Novel (Candlewick, 2023)
- Dasher Can't Wait for Christmas (Candlewick, 2023)

== Awards and honors ==
Awards:

- New England Book Award: Hoops, 2023
- Good Housekeeping Best Kids' Book Award: Hoops, 2023
- California Young Reader Medal: Helen's Big World, 2016
- Lupine Award: Helen's Big World, 2012 (Honor Books: Henry Aaron's Dream, 2010; Jubilee, 2014; Growing Up Pedro, 2015)
- Parents' Choice Gold Award: Mudball, 2005, Jack and the Beanstalk, 2006, Lady Liberty: A Biography, 2008
- The Audrey Geisel Friend of Military Children Award, awarded by United Through Reading: Twenty-One Steps, 2021

Other honors:

- Massachusetts Book Award Honors: Zachary's Ball, 2000; There Goes Ted Williams, 2012; Jubilee, 2014; Growing Up Pedro, 2015)
- Orbis Pictus Award for Outstanding Nonfiction for Children, awarded by the National Council of Teachers of English: Henry Aaron's Dream, Recommended Book, 2010; Growing Up Pedro, Honor Book, 2015
- Texas Bluebonnet Award, master list: Lady Liberty: A Biography, 2009-2010

Other listings:

- ALA Notable Books (Growing Up Pedro, 2016; Helen's Big World, 2013; Twenty-One Steps, 2022)
- Notable Social Studies Trade Books for Young People (Mudball, 2005; Lady Liberty, 2008; Becoming Babe Ruth, 2013; Jubilee, 2015; Crossing Niagara, 2016)
- Oppenheim Toy Portfolio Gold Awards: Zachary's Ball, Lady Liberty, Over the River and Through the Wood, Becoming Babe Ruth, Jack's Path of Courage, There Goes Ted Williams
- New York Times Best Seller list: Dasher, 2019-2022
- Indiebound National Best Seller list: The Gingerbread Pirates, 2009; Red & Lulu, 2017; Dasher, 2019; Hoops, 2023
- USA Today Bestseller list: Dasher, 2020-2022
- Indiebound Kids' Next List : Hoops, 2023
