= Leo Löwenthal =

German sociologist and philosopher

Leo Löwenthal (German: [ˈleːo ˈløːvn̩taːl]; 3 November 1900 – 21 January 1993) was a German sociologist and philosopher usually associated with the Frankfurt School.

== Life ==
Born in Frankfurt as the son of assimilated Jews (his father was a physician), Löwenthal came of age during the turbulent early years of the Weimar Republic. He joined the newly founded Institute for Social Research in 1926 and quickly became its leading expert on the sociology of literature and mass culture as well as the managing editor of the journal it launched in 1932, the Zeitschrift für Sozialforschung. Heterodox and independent Marxists, open to new intellectual currents such as psychoanalysis, and predominantly Jewish, the institute's members swiftly fled Germany when Adolf Hitler came to power in 1933. After a year in Geneva, they settled in New York, where Columbia University gave them shelter.

Löwenthal maintained a close relationship with his colleagues, even during the war when several of them moved to California and he began to work with the Office of War Information in Washington. Although Horkheimer, Adorno, and Friedrich Pollock returned to Frankfurt to reestablish the institute after the war, Löwenthal, like former members Herbert Marcuse, Franz Neumann, Otto Kirchheimer, and Erich Fromm, chose to remain in the United States. After seven years as research director of the Voice of America, and another year at the Stanford Center for the Advanced Study of the Behavioral Sciences, he joined the Berkeley Speech Department in 1956 and shortly thereafter the Department of Sociology. Although officially retiring in 1968, Löwenthal remained vigorously active in departmental and University affairs until virtually the end of his life. From 1968 to 1972, he served on the Budget Committee, and in 1973–74, chaired the Sociology Department.

The private seminar Löwenthal conducted with graduate students interested in the sociology of literature was launched during the student strike of 1970 and continued to meet through the last months of 1992. As two of its participants, Jim Stockinger and Terry Strathman, remember it, the seminar produced a "cross-generational dialogue," whose focus on literature "was particularly liberating" for sociologists unaccustomed to literary analysis. "Good wine, cheese, hearty and spirited debate and a large dose of German conviviality," they recalled, "made these evenings unforgettable experiences." As a former teaching assistant of Löwenthal's, Pamela Munro (now an actress) adds that in these evenings in San Francisco, "Löwenthal exuded a Weimarian atmosphere."

Löwenthal's publications were collected during the 1980s, both in German, by the Suhrkamp Verlag, and in English, by Transaction Press. Most notable among them were Prophets of Deceit (written with Norbert Guterman in 1949), Literature and the Image of Man (1957) and Literature, Popular Culture, and Society (1961). Also included were his early writings on Jewish themes and his last ruminations on postmodernism, against whose dangers he warned. His autobiographical reflections, including conversations with the German sociologist Helmut Dubiel, were published by the University of California as An Unmastered Past in 1987. The extensive interviews he gave in 1989 to another German interlocutor, Frithjof Hager, dealt with postmodernism and other contemporary themes; they stimulated a collection of responses by European and American scholars published in honor of his ninetieth birthday as "Geschichte Denken: Ein Notizbuch für Leo Löwenthal" by the Reclam Verlag of Leipzig. For his eightieth, he had been the recipient of a Festschrift of celebratory essays in issue 45 (1980) of the journal Telos.

In the last decade of his life, Löwenthal was richly honored on both sides of the Atlantic. Awarded the Berkeley Citation and the Federal Republic of Germany's Distinguished Merit Cross in 1985, he also received honorary doctorates from the University of Siegen, the Free University of Berlin, and the University of Hamburg. Further, he was given the city of Frankfurt's Goethe Medal and Adorno Prize, as well as a year at the Berlin Institute for Advanced Study. In 1985, the first full-length appreciation of his work was published by Michael Kausch as "Erziehung und Unterhaltung: Leo Löwenthals Theorie der Massenkommunikation."

== Influence ==
As the final survivor of the Frankfurt School's inner circle, Löwenthal achieved international recognition as a symbol of its collective achievement.

Löwenthal's training in collaborative scholarship and his broad humanistic learning allowed him to play a leading role both in the institutional and intellectual life of the campus as a whole. An early supporter of the Free Speech Movement, but troubled by the excesses that followed, he was a leading member of the faculty committee chaired by Charles Muscatine that produced the widely admired report published as Education at Berkeley.

Löwenthal maintained close friendships with scholars in disparate fields and begin new ones with members of very different generations. He remained a presence long after his active teaching days were over.

Löwenthal died in Berkeley, California.

== Works ==
- Leo Löwenthal, Schriften in fünf Bänden, Frankfurt am Main: Suhrkamp 1980–1987,
1. Literatur und Massenkultur
2. Das bürgerliche Bewußtsein in der Literatur
3. Falsche Propheten. Studien zum Autoritarismus (Translated to English as False prophets : studies on authoritarianism, New Brunswick : Transaction Books, 1987)
4. Judaica. Vorträge. Briefe
5. Philosophische Frühschriften
- Leo Löwenthal, Mitmachen wollte ich nie. Ein autobiografisches Gespräch mit Helmut Dubiel, Suhrkamp 1980, ISBN 3-518-11014-4
