= Go to Sleep, Little Farm =

2014 children's book by Mary Lyn Ray and illustrated by Barbara Cooney

- Author: Mary Lyn Ray
- Illustrator: Christopher Silas Neal
- Cover artist: Neal
- Language: English
- Genre: Children's book
- Publisher: Clarion Books
- Publication date: 2014
- Publication place: United States

Go to Sleep, Little Farm is a 2014 children's book by Mary Lyn Ray, illustrated by Christopher Silas Neal and published by Clarion Books/Harper Collins Publishers.

The book received a Charlotte Zolotow Award commendation.

== Plot ==
Go to Sleep, Little Farm, told in rhyming couplets, depicts a group of animals on a farm settling down to go to sleep, while a young child does the same inside the farmhouse. The book is illustrated in a mixed media style with muted pastels.

== Reception ==
The book was praised by Publishers Weekly, which praised Ray's "pleasingly surreal lines of verse" and, along with The New York Times, likened the book to Margaret Wise Brown's Goodnight Moon. The Times and Kirkus Reviews, however, while praising Ray's poetic language, ultimately panned the book.
