= The Crows of Pearblossom =

Story by Aldous Huxley

- First edition cover
- Author: Aldous Huxley
- Illustrator: Barbara Cooney
- Publisher: Random House
- Publication date: 1967

The Crows of Pearblossom is a short, children's story written in 1944 by the English author Aldous Huxley. In 1967, the story was published by Random House as a children's book, illustrated by Barbara Cooney. A picture book version illustrated by Sophie Blackall was published in 2011 by Abrams Books for Young Readers.

== Plot ==
This story, originally written during the Christmas season of 1944, tells the story of Mr. and Mrs. Crow, (Abraham and Amelia), who live in a cottonwood tree in Pearblossom, California, on the desert north of Los Angeles. Because of the hungry Mr. Rattlesnake, living in his hole at the bottom of the cottonwood tree, Mrs. Crow's eggs never hatch. Mr. Rattlesnake eats each and every one shortly after they are laid. After catching the snake eating her 297th egg that year, Mrs. Crow asks Mr. Crow to actually go into the hole where the snake lives and kill the snake. Thinking better of the process, or, in fact, being somewhat intimidated by the rattlesnake, Mr. Crow confers with a wise friend of his, who lives in a tree nearby. Mr. Crow's friend, Mr. Owl, comes up with an idea. He bakes mud into two stone eggs the same size and shape as Mrs. Crow's, and paints them so they look exactly like her eggs. These imitation eggs are left in the nest to trick the Rattlesnake, who unknowingly eats them both the next day. They cause the Rattlesnake such pain that he thrashes about, tying himself into knots around the branches of the cottonwood, and he eventually passes away. Mrs. Crow goes on to hatch "four families of seventeen children each" and "uses the snake as a clothesline on which to hang the little crows' diapers".

== History ==
Huxley wrote the story for his niece, Olivia de Haulleville, who spent long periods of time with him and his wife Maria in their desert home in Llano, which is just east of the little town of Pearblossom in the Antelope Valley on the Mojave Desert, which in turn lies north of Los Angeles, California. They took walks together, and Aldous and Maria took delight in telling stories to the little girl.

Olivia and her family, the de Haullevilles, were Aldous's cousins. They had moved to Pearblossom, just 4 miles from Llano, where the Huxleys lived. The two families spent a lot of time together and made many excursions into the surrounding desert they loved. Aldous wrote The Crows of Pearblossom during a Christmas holiday in 1944, mentioning in it Olivia's and her brother Siggy's neighbors, Mr. and Mrs. Yost. The Yosts kept a copy of the story, as the original manuscript had been returned to Aldous with the request that he illustrate it. The Bel Air Fire that destroyed his house in Los Angeles in 1961, and his own death in 1963, left the story nearly in oblivion for many years. By 1967, Olivia had become Mrs. Yorgo Cassapidis, living on the island of Hydra in Greece with a five-year-old daughter of her own, Melina.

Olivia de Haulleville eventually moved back to Southern California, and lived for years in the Southern California desert near Joshua Tree National Park, and wrote her memoirs. In 2000 she published Pilgrimage to Java, An Esoteric History of Buddhism, ISBN 0-595-14861-1. Her son, Michael A. Cassapidis, is a Tibetan monk in the Gelug-pa order.

== The Snake's Poem ==
I cannot fly- I have no wings;
I cannot run- I have no legs;
But I can creep where the black bird sings
And eat her speckled eggs, ha, ha,
And eat her speckled eggs.

== Publication history ==
- Huxley, Aldous (1967). The Crows of Pearblossom. Illustrated by Barbara Cooney. New York: Random House. ISBN 978-0-8109-9730-1.
- Huxley, Aldous (2011). The Crows of Pearblossom. Illustrated by Sophie Blackall. New York: Abrams. ISBN 978-0-8109-9730-1.
