= Donald Hall =

American writer (1928–2018)

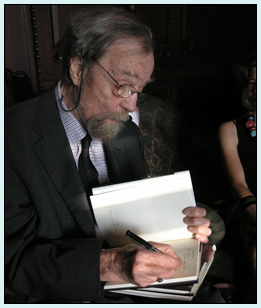
- Born: September 20, 1928; Hamden, Connecticut, U.S.
- Died: June 23, 2018 (aged 89); Wilmot, New Hampshire, U.S.
- Education: Harvard University (BA); Christ Church, Oxford (BLitt)
- Occupations: Poet, writer, editor, critic.
- Spouse(s): Kirby Thompson (m. 1952–69) Jane Kenyon (m. 1972; died 1995)
- Writing career
- Period: 1950–2018
- Genres: Poetry, essays, children's literature, memoirs, biography
- Notable awards: Robert Frost Medal (1991)

Donald Andrew Hall Jr. (September 20, 1928 – June 23, 2018) was an American poet, writer, editor, and literary critic. He was the author of more than 50 books across multiple genres including children's literature, biography, memoirs, essays, plays, sports journalism, and fifteen volumes of verse. He was a graduate of Phillips Exeter Academy, Harvard University, and Christ Church, Oxford. Early in his career, he became the first poetry editor of The Paris Review (1953–1961), the quarterly literary journal, and was noted for interviewing poets and other authors on their craft.

On June 14, 2006, Hall was appointed as the Library of Congress's 14th Poet Laureate Consultant in Poetry (commonly known as "Poet Laureate of the United States"). He is regarded as a "plainspoken, rural poet," and it has been said that, in his work, he "explores the longing for a more bucolic past and reflects [an] abiding reverence for nature."

Hall was respected for his work as an academic, having taught at Stanford University, Bennington College and the University of Michigan, and having made significant contributions to the study and craft of writing.

== Life and career ==
=== Early life and education ===
Hall was born in Hamden, Connecticut, the only child of Donald Andrew Hall, a businessman, and Lucy Wells. He was educated at Phillips Exeter Academy, then earned an A.B. magna cum laude from Harvard in 1951, where he was elected to Phi Beta Kappa, and a B.Litt., from Christ Church, Oxford in 1953.

Hall began writing even before reaching his teens, beginning with poems and short stories, and then moving on to novels and dramatic verse. He continued to write throughout his prep school years at Exeter, and, while still only sixteen years old, attended the Bread Loaf Writers' Conference, where he made his first acquaintance with the poet Robert Frost. That same year, Hall published his first work. While an undergraduate at Harvard, he served on the editorial board of The Harvard Advocate, and got to know a number of people who, like him, were poised with significant ambitions in the literary world, amongst them John Ashbery, Robert Bly, Kenneth Koch, Frank O'Hara, and Adrienne Rich. During his senior year, Hall won the Glascock Prize that Koch had won 3 years earlier.

After leaving Harvard, Hall went to Oxford for two years to study for the B.Litt. He was editor of the magazine Oxford Poetry, literary editor of Isis, editor of New Poems, and poetry editor of The Paris Review. At the end of his first Oxford year, he won the university's Newdigate Prize, awarded for his long poem, "Exile". In September 1952, he married his first wife, Kirby Thompson, with whom he had a son and daughter.

Upon returning to the U.S., Hall went to Stanford University for one year as a creative writing fellow, studying under the poet-critic Yvor Winters. Hall then returned to Harvard, where he spent 1954–1957 in the Society of Fellows. During that time, he published his first book of poems, Exiles and Marriages. In 1957, he co-edited with Robert Pack and Louis Simpson a poetry anthology that was to make a significant impression on both sides of the Atlantic, New Poets of England and America. Its preference for formal, academic verse was later contrasted with Donald Allen's 1960 anthology, The New American Poetry 1945–1960, which emphasized experimental verse. From 1958 to 1964, Hall served as a member of the editorial board for poetry at Wesleyan University Press. In 1968, he signed the "Writers and Editors War Tax Protest" pledge, vowing to refuse tax payments in protest against U.S. involvement in the Vietnam War.

=== Marriage to Jane Kenyon ===
In 1967, Hall and his wife, Kirby, separated; the couple divorced in 1969. While teaching at the University of Michigan in Ann Arbor, Michigan, he met the poet Jane Kenyon, whom he married in 1972. Three years later, the couple moved to Eagle Pond Farm, his grandparents' former home in Wilmot, New Hampshire. Hall and Kenyon were profiled at their home in a 1993 PBS documentary, "A Life Together", which aired as an episode of Bill Moyers Journal. In 1989, when Hall was in his early sixties, it was discovered that he had colon cancer. Surgery followed, but by 1992 the cancer had metastasized to his liver. After another operation, and chemotherapy, he went into remission, though he was told that he only had a 1 in 3 chance of surviving the next five years.

Then, early in 1994, it was discovered that Kenyon had leukemia. Her debilitating illness, her death fifteen months later, and Hall's struggle to come to terms with these tragedies, were the subject of his 1998 poetry collection, Without, which contains poems written in an epistolary format. A subsequent poetry collection dedicated to Kenyon, The Painted Bed, is cited by Publishers Weekly as "more controlled, more varied and more powerful, this taut follow-up volume reexamines Hall's grief while exploring the life he has made since. The book's first poem, 'Kill the Day,' stands among the best Hall has ever written. It examines mourning in 16 long-lined stanzas, alternating catalogue with aphorism, understatement with keen lament: 'How many times will he die in his own lifetime?'"

=== Writing career ===
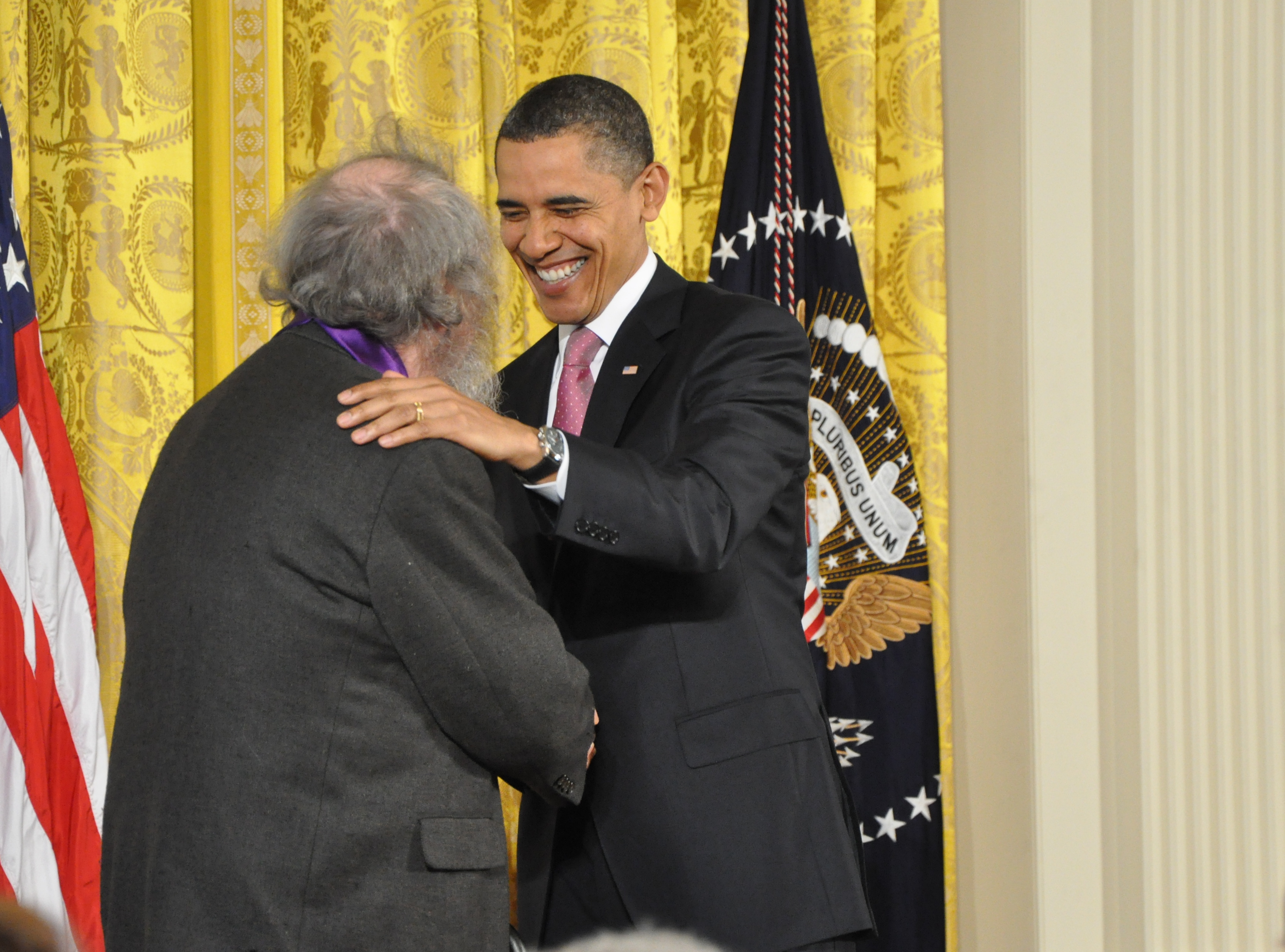
President Barack Obama awarding Hall with the National Medal of Arts

Hall published fifteen books of poetry. Two of these—The One Day (1988) and Old and New Poems (1990)—were included by critic Harold Bloom in his list of works constituting the Western Canon. Hall's later collections, "generally regarded as the best of his career", included Without (1998), The Painted Bed (2002), and White Apples and the Taste of Stone (2006). His recurring themes in poetry were New England rural living, baseball, and how work brings meaning to ordinary life. He was considered a master both of received forms and free verse, and a champion of the art of revision, for whom poetry is a craft, not merely a mode of self-expression.

In addition to his poetry collections, Hall wrote children's books (notably Ox-Cart Man, which won the Caldecott Medal), several memoirs (such as String Too Short to be Saved, Life Work, and Unpacking the Boxes), and a number of plays. He also turned his hand to reviews, criticism, textbooks, sports journalism, and biographies. He devoted substantial time to editing, for example, between 1983 and 1996, he oversaw publication of more than sixty titles for the University of Michigan Press. Starting in 1994, he was closely affiliated with the Bennington College's graduate writing program, giving lectures and readings annually.

Among Hall's many honours and awards were: the Lamont Poetry Prize for Exiles and Marriages (1955), the Edna St Vincent Millay Award (1956), two Guggenheim Fellowships (1963–64, 1972–73), inclusion on the Horn Book Honour List (1986), the Sarah Josepha Hale Award (1983), the Lenore Marshall Poetry Prize (1987), the National Book Critics Circle Award for Poetry (1988), the NBCC Award (1989), the Los Angeles Times Book Prize in poetry (1989), and the Frost Medal (1990). He was nominated for the National Book Award on three occasions (1956, 1979 and 1993). In 1994, he received the Ruth Lilly Poetry Prize for his lifetime achievement.

For five years (1984–89), Hall was Poet Laureate of his home state, New Hampshire. He was subsequently appointed the fourteenth U.S. Poet Laureate, succeeding Ted Kooser. He began serving on October 1, 2006, and was succeeded the following year by Charles Simic. At the time of his appointment, Hall was profiled in an episode of The News Hour with Jim Lehrer which aired on October 16, 2006. Hall was awarded the 2010 National Medal of Arts by President Barack Obama.

Hall's penultimate work is a 2018 recording of an eleven-song cycle on the topic of mortality, entitled "Mortality Mansions: Songs of Love and Loss After 60." The poems/songs are written and read by Hall; the music is by Grammy Award-winning composer Herschel Garfein.

His last book A Carnival of Losses: Essays Nearing Ninety was published on July 10, 2018.

=== Film ===
Hall was the subject of a short documentary by Paul Szynol called Quiet Hours. He also appeared in Ken Burns's 1994 documentary on baseball.

=== Music ===
Hall was the subject of "Great Gig in the Sky," the 5th track of Roger Waters' album The Dark Side of the Moon Redux, released on October 6th, 2023. The song discusses Hall's death, in which his assistant, Kendel Currier, contacts Waters informing him that Hall is in the hospital with sinus cancer. The song continues, eventually revealing that an estate sale was organized for the Eagle Pond Farm, where Waters requested "a couple of bale hooks and some baling twine from the barn." The lyrics refer to Hall's "red chair" - although his chair, famously, was blue. Whether this is a mistake or artistic licence is unclear. The song ends with "Well, R.I.P., Donald Hall."

== Personal life ==
Hall lived at Eagle Pond Farm in Wilmot, New Hampshire, a small town in Merrimack County. He was married to poet and author Jane Kenyon (1947–1995) for 23 years and lived with her until her death.

Donald Hall died on June 23, 2018, at the age of 89, at his home in Wilmot.

== Selected awards and honors ==
- 1951: Lloyd McKim Garrison Prize
- 1952: Newdigate Prize
- 1955: Lamont Poetry Prize, for Exiles and Marriages
- 1956: Edna St. Vincent Millay Award
- 1956: Nomination for the National Book Award
- 1963–1964: Guggenheim Fellowship
- 1972–1973: Guggenheim Fellowship
- 1979: Nomination for the National Book Award
- 1980: Caldecott Medal for Ox-Cart Man
- 1984–1989: Poet Laureate of New Hampshire
- 1983: Sarah Josepha Hale Award
- 1986: Horn Book Honour List
- 1987: Lenore Marshall Poetry Prize
- 1988: National Book Critics Circle Award for Poetry
- 1989: Los Angeles Times Book Prize in Poetry
- 1990: Robert Frost Medal from the Poetry Society of America
- 1991: Honorary Doctor of Letters (in honoris causa) from Bates College
- 1993: Nomination for the National Book Award
- 1994: Ruth Lilly Poetry Prize for his lifetime achievement
- 1999: L.L. Winship/PEN New England Award for Without: Poems
- 2006–2007: Fourteenth U.S. Poet Laureate
- 2010: National Medal of Arts

== Bibliography ==
=== Poetry ===
- 1952: Exile
- 1952: Fantasy Poets Number Four
- 1955: Exiles and Marriages
- 1957: New Poets of England and America
- 1958: The Dark Houses
- 1964: A Roof of Tiger Lilies
- 1962: New Poets of England and America: Second Selection
- 1969: The Alligator Bride
- 1971: The Yellow Room: Love Poems
- 1975: The Town of Hill
- 1975: A Blue Wing Tilts at the Edge of the Sea: Selected Poems, 1964–1974
- 1978: Kicking the Leaves
- 1979: The Toy Bone
- 1981: The Wilderness Years
- 1986: The Happy Man
- 1988: The One Day
- 1990: Old and New Poems
- 1993: The Museum of Clear Ideas
- 1996: The Old Life
- 1998: Without: Poems
- 2000: Two by Two (with Richard Wilbur)
- 2002: The Painted Bed
- 2006: White Apples and the Taste of Stone
- 2011: The Back Chamber
- 2015: The Selected Poems of Donald Hall

=== Essays ===
- 1978: Goatfoot Milktongue Twinbird: Interviews, Essays, and Notes on Poetry, 1970–76
- 1983: The Weather for Poetry: Essays, Reviews, and Notes on Poetry, 1977–81
- 1985: Fathers Playing Catch with Sons: Essays on Sports (Mostly Baseball)
- 1988: Poetry and Ambition: Essays 1982–88
- 1995: Death to the Death of Poetry: Essays, Reviews, Notes, Interviews
- 1995: Principal Products of Portugal: Prose Pieces
- 2014: Essays After Eighty
- 2018: A Carnival of Losses: Notes Nearing Ninety (published posthumously)

=== Biography ===
- 1966: Henry Moore
- 1976: Dock Ellis in the Country of Baseball
- 1978: Remembering Poets: Reminiscences and Opinions (Note: Full titles imply a biographical memoir covering four poets, expanded to cover seven.: Remembering Poets: Reminiscences and Opinions: Dylan Thomas, Robert Frost, T.S. Eliot, Ezra Pound; Their Ancient Glittering Eyes: Remembering Poets and More Poets: Robert Frost, Dylan Thomas, T.S. Eliot, Archibald MacLeish, Yvor Winters, Marianne Moore, Ezra Pound; Old Poets: Reminiscences and Opinions. Introduction by Wesley McNair)
- 1992: Their Ancient Glittering Eyes
- 2021: Old Poets

=== Drama ===
- 1965: An Evening's Frost
- 1975: Bread and Roses
- 1983: Ragged Mountain Elegies

=== For children ===
- 1959: Andrew the Lion Farmer
- 1977: Riddle Rat
- 1979: Ox-Cart Man (illustrated by Barbara Cooney)
- 1981: The Mooch, A Canine Adventure
- 1984: The Man Who Lived Alone
- 1994: The Farm Summer 1942 (illustrated by Barry Moser)
- 1994: I Am the Dog, I Am the Cat (illustrated by Barry Moser)
- 1994: Summer of 1944
- 1994: Lucy's Christmas
- 1995: Lucy's Summer
- 1995: The Pageant (illustrated by Barry Moser)
- 1996: Old Home Day
- 1996: When Willard Met Babe Ruth
- 1997: The Milkman's Boy

=== Short stories ===
- 1987: The Ideal Bakery
- 2003: Willow Temple: New and Selected Stories

=== Memoirs ===
- 1961: String too Short to Be Saved
- 1987: Seasons at Eagle Pond
- 1992: Here at Eagle Pond
- 1993: Life Work
- 2005: The Best Day the Worst Day: Life with Jane Kenyon
- 2007: On Eagle Pond
- 2008: Unpacking the Boxes: A Memoir of a Life in Poetry

=== Textbooks ===
- 1981: To Read Literature
- 1992: To Read a Poem
- 1994: Writing Well (later editions with Sven Birkerts)

=== Recorded ===
- 2018: Mortality Mansions: Songs of Love and Loss after 60 (with Herschel Garfein, Michael Slattery, and Marnie Breckenridge)
