= Elinor Lander Horwitz =

American author (1929–2022)

Elinor Lander Horwitz (March 8, 1929 – November 3, 2022) was an American author of young adult and adult books. She lived in Chevy Chase, Maryland.

Mountain People, Mountain Crafts was on The New York Times' list of "Outstanding Books." "When the Sky is Like Lace" was on the New York Times' list of "Outstanding Books" of the year.

== Personal life ==
Elinor Lander Horwitz was born on March 8, 1929, in New Haven, Connecticut, where she was also raised. After graduating from Smith College, Horwitz wrote book reviews and features for the Washington Star News and for many national magazines. She married neurosurgeon Norman Horwitz.

Horwitz was the mother of the late Pulitzer Prize-winning journalist and author Tony Horwitz and the mother-in-law of Pulitzer Prize-winning journalist and author Geraldine Brooks. Her grandson Nathaniel Horwitz founded Hunterbrook and Mayday Health.

Elinor Lander Horwitz died at her home in Rock Creek, Washington, D.C., on November 3, 2022, at the age of 93.

== Selected works ==
- The Strange Story of the Frog Who Became a Prince
- The Soothsayer's Handbook: A Guide to Bad Signs & Good Vibrations
- Communes in America: The Place Just Right
- Capital Punishment, U.S.A.
- Mountain People, Mountain Crafts
- Contemporary American Folk Artists
- A Child's Garden of Sculpture: Photographed at the Hirshhorn Museum and Sculpture Garden, Smithsonian Institution
- The Bird, the Banner, and Uncle Sam: Images of America in Folk and Popular Art
- Madness, Magic, and Medicine: The Treatment and Mistreatment of the Mentally Ill
- On the Land: The Evolution of American Agriculture
- Our Nation's Lakes
- Our Nation's Wetlands
- Sometimes It Happens
- How to Wreck a Building
- When the Sky is Like Lace
