= Hattie and the Wild Waves =

First edition (publ. Viking Press)

Hattie and the Wild Waves (ISBN 1-883332-31-1) is a 1990 book by Barbara Cooney. It's the loosely autobiographical story of Hattie, the daughter of a well-to-do family of German immigrants living in New York. Hattie decides to pursue a career as an artist.

Kirkus Reviews described the story as "engaging" and noted the story's message "that wealth is incidental to a happy, creative life".
