= Chanticleer and the Fox (book) =

1958 picture book by Barbara Cooney

- Author: Barbara Cooney
- Illustrator: Barbara Cooney
- Genre: Children's picture book
- Publisher: Crowell
- Publication date: 1958
- Publication place: United States

In the children's picture book Chanticleer and the Fox, Barbara Cooney adapted and illustrated the story of Chanticleer and the Fox as told in The Nun's Priest's Tale in Chaucer's Canterbury Tales, translated by Robert Mayer Lumiansky. Published by Crowell in 1958, it was the recipient of the Caldecott Medal for illustration in 1959. It was also one of the Horn Book "best books of the year".

The book had its beginnings in Cooney's delight in the colorful plumage of some exotic chickens she happened to see in the late afternoon October sunlight. However, it wasn't until she read the Nun's Priest's Tale that she realised where and how she could express this artistic impulse. There followed a period of research on medieval times. As with much of her illustration for the previous twenty years, Cooney used a scratchboard technique. As each additional color cost money, Cooney was granted five colors, at least for half the pages, by Crowell. Some pages would be in two colors, red and black, while some double spreads would be split, ideally so that the discrepancy would not be noticed or, better, that the picture would benefit.

It is clear from her acceptance speech for the Caldecott Medal that Cooney knew her choice of story would place demands on its young readers: "I believe that children in this country need a more robust literary diet than they are getting. …It does not hurt them to read about good and evil, love and hate, life and death. Nor do I think they should read only about things that they understand. '…a man's reach should exceed his grasp.' So should a child's. For myself, I will never talk down to, or draw down to, children."

Winning the Caldecott medal was a turning-point for Cooney. Her editor offered work on a full colour book with a French setting which she went to France to research. She also changed her artistic style after this success, moving from scratchboard as medium to painting.

In a retrospective essay about the Caldecott Medal-winning books from 1956 to 1965, Norma R. Fryatt wrote, "The dramatic possibilities in the tale are exploited gently but firmly, even turning the limitations of color printing into advantages... Chanticleer and the Fox is retold with clarity, freshness and dedication to the task."

Awards
| Preceded by Time of Wonder | Caldecott Medal recipient 1959 | Succeeded by Nine Days to Christmas |
