= Henry Pope Anderson =

Farm labor union organizer, activist, author, and historian

- Born: December 14, 1927; Plano, Texas, U.S.
- Died: October 24, 2016 (aged 88); Oakland, California, U.S.
- Known for: Farm labor activist and historian
- Notable work: So Shall Ye Reap (book)

Henry Pope Anderson (December 14, 1927 – October 24, 2016) was a farm labor union organizer, activist, author, and historian. He studied the Bracero program (an agricultural guest-worker program) as a graduate student in Public Health at the University of California. He was Director of Research at Agricultural Workers Organizing Committee (AWOC), an early AFL/CIO-sponsored effort to unionize farm workers. Anderson organized and led Citizens for Farm Labor, a San Francisco Bay Area-based group that supported farm labor organization activities. He wrote the book “So Shall Ye Reap” documenting the history of farm labor unionization in California.

== Early life ==
Anderson was born in Plano, Texas, and grew up primarily in Palo Alto, California. He was class president of Palo Alto High School in his senior year, 1943-44. After a stint in the Army, he graduated from Pomona College in 1949. He received a Masters in Sociology from the University of Hawaii in 1951, and then worked for the California Department of Public Health.

== Bracero health study ==
In 1955 Anderson enrolled in the UC Berkeley School of Public Health. He proposed a research project to study health issues among migrant Mexican farm workers in the U.S. This project was funded by an NIH grant under Professor Edward Rogers. Anderson learned that the majority of these farm workers were part of the bracero program, a federal program under which agriculture companies hired temporary Mexican workers. The program had rules protecting the health and rights of the workers, but these were left to the growers to enforce, and most workers lived in poor conditions.

In 1957, with the help of a Spanish-speaking assistant, Anderson surveyed thousands of incoming braceros at the "reception centers" in Empalme, Sonora, Mexico and El Centro, California. While conducting the study, Anderson learned about the political and economic context in which the Bracero program existed, which he later described as "... a system that served a conglomerate of economic interests, all of them on one side of the scale. It was a program largely of benefit to industrialized agriculture, and as part of their system they seemed to have friends among the government agencies that were supposed to be administering the program. It wasn't exactly slavery, but they had to sign contracts that bound them to work for whoever they were told, doing whatever they were told, at whatever wages and conditions they were told, for however long they were told -- which they had absolutely no say and no power to change."

In 1958 Anderson learned that the bracero program's enabling legislation - Public Law 78 - was under Congressional review, and that the executive committee of the American Friends Service Committee (AFSC) was meeting in San Francisco to decide whether to take a stand on it. He was invited to make a presentation to the committee, but was unable to do so. Instead, he sent the committee a written statement entitled "Social Justice and Foreign Contract Labor", describing his observations and opinions.

As it turned out, the AFSC distributed Anderson's statement to a number of government officials involved in the bracero program. He soon received letters from officials in the California State Department of Employment and the U.S. Department of Labor challenging his statement and demanding its retraction. The State Farm Bureau Federation, a trade group for agri-business with ties to the state government and UC, also received the statement. They made the connection to Anderson's research project and quickly moved to stop it. His assistant was removed from Empalme and barred from El Centro. Initially, Anderson was told that the project would be immediately ended (and he would be fired) unless he retracted the statement's assertions. He refused to do this, and eventually a compromise was offered in which he would be allowed to write up the results of his existing interview data but would not be allowed to collect more.

Anderson eventually completed a 750-page Masters thesis. It contained a chapter describing the economic and political context of the bracero program. Because of this chapter, his advisor, Prof. Rogers, forced him to recall the 100 copies he had distributed, and destroy them all. Later (August 1961), at the request of Prof. Rogers, Anderson wrote an abridged (328 page) version of the report. It was later published under the title “The Bracero Program in California”, by Arno Press, in 1982.

== Agricultural Workers Organizing Committee (AWOC) ==
In 1959, Anderson left the university, disillusioned by what he viewed as its failure to stand up to the bracero lobby in defense of academic freedom. During that period there were several nascent efforts to organize farm workers, with both grass-roots and top-down dues-collecting approaches. One of the latter was the Agricultural Workers Organizing Committee (AWOC), which was being formed and financed by the AFL-CIO, under the direction of Norman Smith, who had organized automobile workers in the 1930s. Smith contacted Anderson and offered him a job as Director of Research, which he accepted and started in July 1959.

At AWOC, Anderson wrote about fifty research reports on various labor-related topics such as wages, crop prices and legislative activity. These were distributed to other unions, government agencies, and growers’ organizations. He did some research in the fields - for example, to survey wages actually being paid to workers. In 1959 he testified on behalf of AWOC at congressional hearings in Washington DC.

AWOC had little success in organizing farm workers, although it was peripherally involved in brief strikes by cherry and lettuce workers. While at AWOC Anderson met a number of people with significant roles in the labor movement. Dolores Huerta briefly worked at AWOC as a secretary; she soon left and joined Cesar Chavez at the Community Service Organization. Ernesto Galarza, who had led earlier unionization efforts, served briefly as Assistant Director.

In June 1961 the AFL/CIO cut off funding to AWOC. The organization continued operating with reserve funds for another year; the staff were laid off except Anderson. Anderson began organizing community-based volunteer activities. He conceived and organized “Harvest House”, a house in Stockton (near agricultural areas) where volunteers from the Bay Area could visit and help in various ways.

In November 1961 Anderson conceived the idea of convening everyone involved in the farm labor movement to discuss the methods and goals of the movement. He organized the conference, which was held in the town of Strathmore on December 2–3. About 200 people attended. Attendees included Norman Smith, Father Thomas McCullough, and Dolores Huerta. The keynote speaker was Norman Thomas, the leader of the American Socialist party. The conference was the subject of a radio documentary, “We will go on”, by Ernest Lowe, which aired on Feb 1, 1962 on KPFA.

The annual convention of the AFL-CIO was taking place in Miami one week after the Strathmore conference, and AWOC was entitled to send a voting delegate. It was decided to send Maria Moreno as the delegate. A documentary about Moreno, “Adios Amor”, describes this and includes interview footage with Anderson.

== Later career ==
After leaving AWOC in May 1962, Anderson returned to the California State Department of Public Health as a researcher. From 1965 to 1968 he worked on a project to study claims filed by doctors under the recently created Medi-Cal program. The study found rampant fraud, but because of the strong AMA lobby, these findings never led to prosecution or policy change. From 1968 to 1975 he worked on a project to study the health effects of pesticide usage on farm workers, and to make recommendations for regulation of this usage.

In July 1963 Anderson did a commentary on KPFA - a listener-supported radio station in Berkeley, California - about the future of farm labor after the Bracero program, which had been ended by Congress earlier that year. This evolved into a series of monthly commentaries, initially on farm labor but eventually branching out to broader political and social issues, which continued to 1972.

In October 1963, Anderson organized Citizens for Farm Labor, a Berkeley-based community group with the goal of supporting farm labor causes, informing the public, and participating in public and legislative hearings. The group published a monthly newsletter, Farm Labor Magazine. In 1965, the group supported the United Farm Workers grape strike in Delano by delivering truckloads of food to the striking workers.

In February 1965 Anderson was invited by the Student Nonviolent Coordinating Committee (SNCC) to participate in a meeting in Biloxi, Mississippi, to discuss connections between the farm labor and civil rights movements. Other attendees at the meeting included Stokely Carmichael and Howard Zinn.

In March 1965, Anderson was approached by Joan London, the daughter of Jack London and a member of Citizens for Farm Labor, with the idea of co-authoring a book about the history of the farm labor movement in California. This book, So Shall Ye Reap, was published in 1970.

After leaving the Department of Public Health in 1975, Anderson became a real estate investor and landlord in the Berkeley area, but he continued labor-related activities.

In 1982 Anderson was invited to the 20th anniversary celebration, in San Jose, of the founding of the National Farm Workers Association by Cesar Chavez and Dolores Huerta in Delano. In 1993 Anderson attended the memorial service for Cesar Chavez in Delano. In October 2001 he organized, with Gilbert Gonzalez, a panel on guest worker programs at the North American Labor History Conference (NALHC). He was presented with a Lifetime Achievement Award by the Southwest Labor Studies Organization (SLSO) for his contributions to labor history.

Anderson wrote an unfinished biography of mining union leader Vincent Saint John. He learned that Saint John was buried in an unmarked grave in Oakland's Mountain View Cemetery, and together with Archie Green he organized an initiative to raise money for a headstone. The headstone was installed in a ceremony in June 2001. Anderson is interviewed extensively in Harvest of Loneliness, a 2010 documentary about the Bracero program, directed by Gilbert Gonzalez. He also appears in Adios Amor, a 2017 documentary about Maria Moreno, directed by Laurie Coyle.

Anderson died in Oakland on Oct. 24, 2016. He was survived by his wife, Virginia Foote Anderson, and five children.

== Works ==
- So Shall Ye Reap: The Story of Cesar Chavez & the Farm Workers' Movement. Joan London and Henry Anderson. Published by Thomas Y. Crowell (1970).
- The Bracero Program in California (The Chicano Heritage). Henry P. Anderson. Ayer Co. Publishing; Reprint edition (June 1, 1976).
- Fields of bondage: The Mexican contract labor system in industrialized agriculture. (1963)
