= Daniel Minter =

American painter

- Born: 1961 (age 64–65); Ellaville, Georgia, U.S.
- Education: Art Institute of Atlanta
- Known for: painting, illustration, sculpture, themes of diaspora and spirituality
- Spouse: Marcia Minter
- Awards: Caldecott Honor; 2020; Coretta Scott King Illustrator Honor; 2013

Daniel Minter (born 1961 in Ellaville, Georgia) is an African-American artist and educator working in painting, sculpture, illustration, assemblage, and public art.

== Education ==
Minter received his A.A. from Art Institute of Atlanta. He received an Honorary Doctorate of Arts from Maine College of Art in 2019 and from Colby College in 2023.

== Career ==
Early in his career, Minter worked as a graphic designer. He has illustrated thirteen children's books, including two award-winning collaborations with the author Kelly Starling Lyons: Ellen's Broom, which won a 2013 Coretta Scott King Illustrator Honor, and Going Down Home with Daddy, which was a 2020 Caldecott Honor recipient.

Minter has also designed two Kwanzaa stamps for the United States Postal Service, issued in 2004 and in 2011.

Minter now lives in Portland, Maine, where he continues his creative work and assists with The Underground Railroad, of which he is a board member. Minter's work has appeared at many shows throughout Portland and can be seen in the official logos of the Underground Rail-Road and the Maine Interfaith Youth Alliance.

== Books (Illustrated) ==
- 2025 And She Was Loved: Toni Morrison's Life in Stories, by Andrea Davis Pinkney
- 2022 Blue: A History of the Color as Deep as the Sea and as Wide as the Sky, by Nana Ekua Brew-Hammond
- 2019 Going Down Home with Daddy, by Kelly Starling Lyons
- 2019 The Women Who Caught The Babies: A Story of African American Midwives, by Eloise Greenfield
- 2019 I Remember: Poems and Pictures of Heritage, compiled by Lee Bennett Hopkins
- 2018 So Tall Within: Sojourner Truth's Long Walk Toward Freedom, by Gary D. Schmidt
- 2017 Cay and Adlee Find Their Voice, by Russell J Quaglia and Cali Quaglia
- 2016 Step Right Up: How Doc and Jim Key Taught the World about Kindness, by Donna Janell Bowman
- 2012 Ellen's Broom, by Kelly Starling Lyons
- 2006 The First Marathon: The Legend of Pheidippides, by Susan Reynolds
- 2002 New Year Be Coming! A Gullah Year, by Katharine Boling
- 2000 Seven Spools of Thread: A Kwanzaa Story, by Angela Shelf Medearis
- 1998 Bubber Goes to Heaven, by Arna Bontemps
- 1998 The Riches of Oseola McCarty, by Evelyn Coleman
- 1994 The Foot Warmer and the Crow, by Evelyn Coleman

== Awards ==
- 2020 Caldecott Honor, Going Down Home with Daddy
- 2013 Coretta Scott King Illustrator Honor, Ellen’s Broom
- 1994 National Endowment for the Arts and Arts International, Travel Grants Fund for Artists, Salvador Bahia Brazil
