= Lupine Award =

Annual literary prize

The Lupine Award is a literary prize given annually by the Maine Library Association to a living author or illustrator. The prize can be given to a living illustrator or author who was born in or who resides in Maine for all or part of the year, or has created work with a characterization, plot, or setting that is focused on Maine. The prize has been awarded annually since 1993. Since 2005, separate prizes have been awarded, one to a picture book and the other to a juvenile or young adult book.

Beginning in 1989, the Youth Services Section Interest Group of the Maine Library Association has been presenting the award. One winner and one honoree in two categories, picture book and juvenile/young adult, are given the award.

== Juvenile/Young Adult Winners ==
| Year | Winner | Honorable Mentions |
|---|---|---|
| 2024 | A Game of Noctis by Deva Fagan | Continental Drifter by Kathy Macleod |
| 2023 | Hoops by Matt Tavares | The Windeby Puzzle by Lois Lowry |
| 2022 | | |
| 2021 | Down to Earth by Betty Culley | Franklin Endicott and the Third Key by Kate DiCamillo |
| 2020 | Call Me American (Adapted for Young Adults) The Extraordinary True Story of a Young Somali Immigrant by Abdi Nor Iftin | Echo Mountain by Lauren Wolk |
| 2019 | Searching for Lottie by Susan Ross | American Trailblazers: 50 Remarkable People who Shaped U.S. History by Lisa Trusiani, illustrated by Pau Morgan, Toby Newsome, Cecilia Puglesi |
| 2018 | The Mad Wolf's Daughter by Diane Magras | What the Wind Can Tell You by Sarah Marie A. Jette |
| 2017 | Grit by Gillian French | Who Killed Darius Drake? by Rodman Philbrick |
| 2016 | Some Writer! The Story of E.B. White by Melissa Sweet | Wrecked by Maria Padian |
| 2015 | Paper Things by Jennifer Richard Jacobson | The Boys Who Challenged Hitler: Knud Pederson and the Churchill Club by Phillip Hoose |
| 2014 | Zane and the Hurricane: A Story of Katrina by Rodman Philbrick | Half a Chance by Cynthia Lord |
| 2013 | Out of Nowhere by Maria Padian | The Water Castle by Megan Frazer Blakemore |
| 2012 | The Good Braider by Terry Farish | Giant Squid: Searching for a Sea Monster by Mary M. Cerullo and Clyde F. E. Roper |
| 2011 | Small As an Elephant by Jennifer Richard Jacobson | Lost Trail: Nine Days Alone in the Wilderness by Donn Fendler and Lynn Plourde, illustrator Ben Bishop |
| 2010 | Touch Blue by Cynthia Lord | Henry Aaron's Dream written and illustrated by Matt Tavares |
| 2009 | The Mostly True Adventures of Homer P. Figg by Rodman Philbrick | Stitches: A Memoir written and illustrated by David Small |
| 2008 | Season of Ice by Diane Les Becquets | Brett McCarthy: Work in Progress by Maria Padian |
| 2007 | Dragon's Egg by Sarah Thomson | Rickshaw Girl by Matali Perkins, Illustrator Jamie Hogan |
| 2006 | Kristin's Wilderness: A Braided Trail by Garrett Conover | Berenice Abbott, Photographer; an Independent Vision by George Sullivan |
| 2005 | Stained by Jennifer Richard Jacobson | Stained by Jennifer Richard Jacobson |
| 2004 | The Race to Save the Lord God Bird by Phillip Hoose | Lizzie Bright and the Buckminster Boy by Gary D. Schmidt |
| 2003 | The Water Gift and the Pig of the Pig by Jacqueline Briggs Martin, illustrator Linda S. Wingerter | A Camping Spree with Mr. Magee written and illustrated by Chris Van Dusen Swan Harbor written and illustrated by Laura Rankin Timberrr!: A History of Logging in New England by Mary Morton Cowan |
| 2002 | Becoming Joe DiMaggio by Maria Testa | Bloody Jack by L. A Meyer Just Ducky written and illustrated by Kathy Mallat The Sea Chest by Toni Buzzeo illustrated by Marie Grand Pre |
| 2001 | Following Fake Man by Barbara Ware Holmes | Racing the Past by Sis Deans Turtle Splash by Cathryn Falwell The Lobster War by Ethan Howland |
| 2000 | The Truth about Great White Sharks by Mary M. Cerullo, photographer Jeffery L. Rotman | The Last Book in the Universe by Rodman Philbrick |
| 1999 | Seal Island School by Susan Bartlett, illustrator Tricia Tusa | The Hermit Thrush Sings by Susan Butler Wild Child by Lynn Plourde, illustrated by Greg Couch |
| 1998 | Snowflake Bentley by Jacqueline Briggs Martin, illustrator Mary Azarian | Painters of the Caves by Patricia Lauber |
| 1997 | Marven of the Great North Woods by Kathryn Lasky, illustrator Kevin Hawkes | Cocoa Ice by Diana Appelbaum, illustrated by Holly Meade |
| 1996 | Grandmother Bryant's Pocket by Jacquelie Briggs Martin | No Honorable Mention |
| 1995 | A Year on Monhegan Island by Julia Dean | Night of the Pufflings written and photographed by Bruce McMillan To Hold this Ground: A Desperate Battle at Gettysburg by Susan Provost Beller |
| 1994 | Prize in the Snow by Bill Easterling, illustrator Mary Beth Owens | No Honorable Mention |
| 1993 | Wild Fox by Cherie Mason, illustrator Jo Ellen McAllister Stammen | No Honorable Mention |
| 1992 | Sing to the Sun written and illustrated by Ashley Bryan | No Honorable Mention |
| 1991 | Rosebud and Red Flannel by Ethel Pochocki, illustrator Mary Beth Owens | No Honorable Mention |
| 1990 | Hattie and the Wild Waves written and illustrated by Barbara Cooney | No Honorable Mention |
| 1989 | Brickyard Summer by Paul Janeczko | No Honorable Mention |

== Picture Book Winners ==
| Year | Winner | Honorable Mentions |
|---|---|---|
| 2024 | Kende! Kende! Kende! by Kirsten Cappy and Yaya Gentille | The Tree of Life by Elisa Boxer |
| 2023 | The Lobster Lady Alexandra S.D. Hinrichs, illustrated by Jamie Hogan | Oh, Chickadee! by Jennifer Richard Jacobson, illustrated by Jamie Hogan |
| 2022 | | |
| 2021 | The First Blade of Sweetgrass Suzanne Greenlaw and Gabriel Frey, illustrated by Nancy Baker | The Little Library by Margaret McNamara, illustrated by G. Brian Karas |
| 2020 | Magnificent Homespun Brown by Samara Cole Doyon, illustrated by Kaylani Juanita | Chowder Rules! The True Story of an Epic Food Fight by Anna Redding Crowley, illustrated by Vita Lane |
| 2019 | Going Down Home with Daddy by Kelly Starling Lyons, illustrated by Daniel Minter | Maybe Tomorrow? by Charlotte Agell, illustrated by Ana Ramirez González |
| 2018 | We Don't Eat Our Classmates by Ryan T. Higgins | There's a Dinosaur on the 13th Floor by Wade Bradford, illustrated by Kevin Hawkes |
| 2017 | Red and Lulu by Matt Tavares | Baabwaa and Wooliam by David Elliott, illustrated by Melissa Sweet |
| 2016 | Freedom Over Me by Ashley Bryan | Hotel Bruce by Ryan T. Higgins |
| 2015 | Island Birthday by Eva Murray, illustrator Jamie Hogan | Growing Up Pedro by Matt Tavares |
| 2014 | The Right Word: Roget and his Thesaurus by Jen Bryant, illustrator Melissa Sweet | Jubilee! One Man's Big, Bold and Very, Very Loud Celebration of Peace by Alicia Potter, illustrator Matt Tavares |
| 2013 | The Secret Pool by Kimberly Ridley, illustrator Rebekah Raye | Brave Girl by Michelle Markel, illustrator Melissa Sweet |
| 2012 | Helen's Big World: The Life of Helen Keller by Doreen Rappaport, illustrator Matt Tavares | Eggs 1 2 3: Who will the babies be? by Janet Halfmann, illustrator Betsy Thompson |
| 2011 | Balloons over Broadway: The True Story of the Puppeteer of Macy's Parade written and illustrated by Melissa Sweet | Sammy in the Sky by Barbara Walsh, illustrator Jamie Wyeth |
| 2010 | Many Hands: A Penobscott Indian Story by Angeli Perrow, illustrator Heather Austin | A Balloon for Isabel by Deborah Underwood, illustrator Laura Rankin |
| 2009 | The Circus Ship written and illustrated by Chris Van Dusen | The Scallop Christmas by Jane Freeberg, illustrator Astrid Sheckels |
| 2008 | A River of Words: The Story of William Carlos Williams by Jen Bryant, illustrator Melissa Sweet | How Mama Brought the Spring by Fran Manushkin, illustrator Holly Berry |
| 2007 | Velma Gratch and the Way Cool Butterfly by Alan Madison, Illustrator Kevin Hawkes | Sky Sweeper by Phillis Gershator, Illustrator Holly Meade |
| 2006 | For You Are a Kenyan Child by Kelly Cunnane, illustrator Ana Juan | Max's Words by Kate Banks, illustrator Boris Kulikov |
| 2005 | A Kick in the Head: An Everyday Guide to Poetic Form by Paul Janeczko, illustrator Chris Raschka | Carmine: A Little More Red written and illustrated by Melissa Sweet |
