= Mary Lyn Ray =

American children's writer (born 1946)

- Born: 1946 (age 79–80); Monroe, Louisiana, U.S.
- Education: Smith College (AB); University of Delaware (MA)
- Occupations: Writer and conservationist
- Writing career
- Genre: Children's literature

Mary Lyn Ray (born 1946) is an American author of children's literature, a conservationist, and a historic preservationist. Her books have been praised in reviews including Publishers Weekly, the School Library Journal, The Horn Book Magazine, and The Washington Post, which listed her book Stars among its best children's books of 2011. The New York Times likened her 2014 book Go to Sleep, Little Farm to Goodnight Moon.

== Biography ==
Mary Lyn Ray was born in 1946 in Monroe, Louisiana and grew up in Little Rock, Arkansas. In 1968, she received an A.B. in American Studies from Smith College. In 1970, she received an M.A. in Early American Arts and Culture from the University of Delaware, where she was a Winterthur Fellow at Winterthur Museum.

In 1984, she bought an old farm and farmhouse in South Danbury, New Hampshire, which would also inspire her future books.

Ray's 2011 book Stars was nominated for The E.B. White Read Aloud Award. Go to Sleep, Little Farm and her 2015 book Goodnight, Good Dog received Charlotte Zolotow Award commendations.

Ray is also a conservationist and has received several commendations for her work, including New Hampshire Conservationist of the Year in 1989.

== Bibliography ==
The Library of Congress lists 32 works by Mary Lyn Ray

- Angel Baskets: A Little Story about the Shakers (1987)
- Pumpkins (1992)
- A Rumbly Tumbly Glittery Gritty Place (1993).
- Alvah and Arvilla (1994)
- Pianna (1994)
- Shaker Boy (1994)
- Mud (1996)
- Basket Moon (1998)
- Red Rubber Boot Day (2000)
- All Aboard! (2002)
- Welcome, Brown Bird (2004)
- Christmas Farm (2008)
- Stars (2011)
- Boom! (2013)
- Deer Dancer (2014)
- Go to Sleep, Little Farm (2014)
- A Violin for Elva (2015)
- A Lucky Author Has a Dog (2015)
- Goodnight, Good Dog (2015)
- The Thank You Book (2018)
- The Friendship Book (2019)
- The House of Grass and Sky (2021)
- How to Have a Birthday (2021)
- Vroom Vroom (2021)
- Once Upon a Fairy Tale House (2023)
- When You Find the Right Rock (2024)
