= Rutherford George Montgomery =

American children's writer

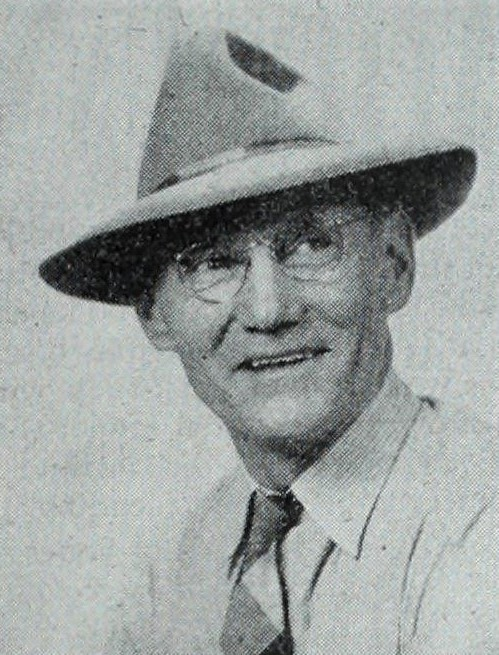
Rutherford George Montgomery by Morton Harvey, c. 1947

Rutherford George Montgomery (April 12, 1894 – July 3, 1985) was an American writer of children's books. In addition to his given name, he used the pseudonyms A.A. Avery, Al Avery, Art Elder, E.P. Marshall, and Everitt Proctor.

== Life ==
Montgomery was born in Straubville, Sargent County, North Dakota, "a true ghost town" as of 2005. to George Y. and Matilda Proctor Montgomery. He studied at Colorado Agricultural College, Western State College of Colorado, and University of Nebraska; taught elementary school in Hot Springs County, Wyoming; and from 1917 to 1919 served in the United States Air Corps. During the 1920s, he worked as a teacher and principal at junior and senior high schools in Montrose County, Colorado.

Montgomery married Eunice Opal Kirks in 1930; they had three children. He served Gunnison County, Colorado, as a judge from 1931 to 1936 and as county commissioner from 1932 to 1938, then became a freelance writer.

While still at school, Montgomery began writing stories about the wild animals that lived around his family's farm. He went on to write books about aviation and the people, landscapes and animals of the American West, particularly horses. In all, he wrote more than 100 books.

From 1941 to 1946, Montgomery was a writer for Dick Tracy. He worked as a creative writing teacher 1955–57 and as a scriptwriter for Walt Disney Studios 1958–1962.

== Literary awards ==
- Kildee House: Newbery Award Honor Book, 1950.
- Wapiti the Elk: Commonwealth Club of California Juvenile Silver Medal, 1952
- Beaver Water: New York Herald Tribune Children's Spring Book Festival Award, 1956; Boy's Clubs of America Junior Book Award, 1957
- The Stubborn One: Western Writers of America Golden Spur Award, 1965

== Works ==
As Everitt Proctor

- The last cruise of the Jeannette (1944)
- Men against the ice (1946)

As Rutherford Montgomery

- Warhawk Patrol (1944)

As Al Avery, A Yankee Flier

Pulse-quickening stories of the fearless young airman, Stan Wilson. According to the Library of Congress catalog, all nine books were 204 to 216-page, published by Grosset & Dunlap from 1941 to 1946. The first six were illustrated by Paul Laune, the last three by Clayton Knight.

- A Yankee Flier with the R.A.F. (1941)
- A Yankee Flier in the Far East (1942)
- A Yankee Flier in the South Pacific (1943)
- A Yankee Flier in North Africa (1943)
- A Yankee Flier in Italy (1944)
- A Yankee Flier Over Berlin (1944)
- A Yankee Flier in Normandy (1945)
- A Yankee Flier on a Rescue Mission (1945)
- A Yankee Flier Under Secret Orders (1946)

The Golden Stallion

- The Golden Stallion (1951); also published as The Capture of the Golden Stallion
- The Golden Stallion (abridged)
- The Golden Stallion's Revenge (1953)
- The Golden Stallion to the Rescue (1954)
- The Golden Stallion's Victory (1956)
- The Golden Stallion and the Wolf Dog (1958)
- The Golden Stallion's Adventure at Redstone (1959)
- The Golden Stallion and the Mysterious Feud (1967)

Other

- A Kinkajou on the Town
- Amikuk
- Beaver Water
- Big Brownie
- Big Red: A Wild Stallion (1971)
- Black Powder Empire
- Broken Fang
- Carcajou
- Claim jumpers of Marble Canyon
- Corey's Sea Monster
- Crazy Kill Range (1963)
- Dolphins As They Are (1966)
- El Blanco: The Legend of the White Stallion (1961)
- Ghost Town Adventure
- Gray Wolf
- High Country
- Hill Ranch
- Husky
- Iceblink (1941), as by George R. Montgomery
- In Happy Hollow
- Into The Groove (1966)
- Jet Navigator, Strategic Air Command
- Kent Barstow Aboard the Dyna Soar
- Kent Barstow and the Commando Flight
- Kent Barstow on a B-70 Mission
- Kent Barstow: Space Man
- Kildee House
- King of the Castle: The Story of a Kangaroo Rat
- McGonnigle's Lake
- McNulty's Holiday
- Midnight: Wild Stallion of the West (1940)
- Mister Jim (1953)
- Pekan the Shadow
- Rufus
- Snowman (1962)
- The Capture of West Wind (1962)
- The Living Wilderness
- The Silver Hills
- The Stubborn One (1965)
- Timberline Tales
- Troopers Three
- Walt Disney's Cougar: A Fact-Fiction Nature Story
- Walt Disney's The Odyssey of an Otter
- Wapiti the Elk
- War Wings
- Weecha The Racoon
- Whitetail: The Story of a Prairie Dog
- Yellow Eyes
