= Maine Library Association =

Professional association for librarians in Maine

- Formation: March 19, 1891; 135 years ago
- Founded at: Augusta, Maine
- Parent organization: American Library Association
- Website: www.mainelibraries.org

The Maine Library Association (MLA) is a professional organization for Maine's librarians and library workers. It was founded in 1891 at the Maine State Library in Augusta, Maine, with the stated goal of "promotion of library interests in the State of Maine."

The organization began in 1891 with twenty-five members, largely organized by the state librarian, Leonard Carver, and George Little, a librarian at Bowdoin College. MLA began holding annual meetings in 1894.

In 1958, a Standards Committee was appointed, resulting in the Association adopting Minimum Standards for Public Library Service in Maine in 1962. MLA published their first organizational handbook in 1915 which listed the names and affiliations of all MLA members as well as the list of all the libraries which belonged to the organization.

== See also ==
- List of libraries in the United States
