= 1994 in poetry =

Nationality words link to articles with information on the nation's poetry or literature (for instance, Irish or France).

== Events ==
- May 23 — C. P. Cavafy's poem "Ithaka" is read at the funeral of Jacqueline Kennedy Onassis by her longtime companion, Maurice Tempelsman.
- October 6 — First annual National Poetry Day in the United Kingdom, established by William Sieghart.
- October 31 (Halloween) — 15,000 copies of Edgar Allan Poe's "The Raven" are distributed free at public libraries. In Austin, Texas, someone from the local coroner's office and someone from a local tax department gives a "death and taxes" reading of the poem.
- Allen Ginsberg sells his papers to Stanford University for $1 million.
- Wyn Cooper's "All I Wanna Do" is put to music by Sheryl Crow who makes it the United States' No. 1 hit rock tune.
- Welsh poet Tony Curtis becomes Professor of Poetry at the University of Glamorgan.
- Poetry Canada Review folds, the publication was founded in 1978 by Clifton Whiten in order to publish and review poetry from across Canada.

=== Poets depicted in the movies ===
- Dorothy Parker's poems are featured in Mrs. Parker and the Vicious Circle
- In the film Four Weddings and a Funeral, directed by Mike Newell, W. H. Auden's "Stop all the clocks" is read as a eulogy. "[I]t so moved audiences that Random House published a slender paperback with "Funeral Blues" plus nine other Auden poems in a hot-selling edition of forty thousand copies."
- Pablo Neruda's 1952 stay in a villa owned by Italian historian Edwin Cerio on the island of Capri is depicted in a fictionalized version this year the popular film Il Postino ("The Postman"). Neruda is treated worshipfully in the film.

== Works published in English ==
Listed by nation where the work was first published and again by the poet's native land, if different; substantially revised works listed separately:

=== Australia ===
- Robert Adamson Waving to Hart Crane
- Jennifer Harrison: Michelangelo's Prisoners, winner of the 1995 Anne Elder Award for first book of poetry; North Fitzroy: Black Pepper
- Les Murray:
  - Collected Poems, Port Melbourne, William Heinemann Australia
  - Translations from the Natural World
- David Rowthbaum, New and Selected Poems (1945–93)

=== Canada ===
- Christian Bök, Crystallography ISBN 978-1-55245-119-9
- Roo Borson, Night Walk, ISBN 0-19-541082-3 (nominated for a Governor General's Award) American-Canadian
- Margaret Christakos, Other Words for Grace (Stratford, Ontario: Mercury Press)
- George Elliott Clarke, Lush Dreams, Blue Exile: Fugitive Poems 1978–1993. Lawrencetown Beach, Nova Scotia: Pottersfield, ISBN 0-919001-83-1 Canada
- Don Domanski, Stations of the Left Hand (nominated for a Governor General's Award)
- Cherie Geauvreau, Even the Fawn Has Wings, a first collection
- Gary Geddes, Girl by the Water
- Ralph Gustafson, Tracks in the Snow
- Evelyn Lau, In the House of Slaves
- Tim Lilburn, Moosewood Sandhills, winner of the Canadian Authors Association Award for Poetry, Canada
- A. F. Moritz:
  - Mahoning
  - Phantoms in the Ark
- Susan Musgrave, Forcing the Narcissus
- P. K. Page, Hologram: A Book of Glosas, poems in 14th-century Spanish stanzaic form
- John Pass, Radical Innocence (ISBN 1-55017-107-0) Canadian
- Al Purdy, Naked with Summer in Your Mouth
- Linda Rogers, Hard Candy, including "Wrinkled Coloratura", winner of the new Stephen Leacock Award
- Joe Rosenblatt, Beds and Consenting Dreamers
- Stephen Scobie, Gospel
- Francis Sparshott, The Hanging Gardens of Etobicoke
- George Woodcock, George Woodcock's Introduction to Canadian Poetry, Toronto: ECW Press

=== India, in English ===
- Imtiaz Dharker, Postcards from God ( Poetry in English ), Viking Penguin
- Eunice de Souza, Selected and New Poems ( Poetry in English ), St Xavier's College, Department of English Publication, Mumbai.
- E.V. Ramakrishnan, A Python in A Snake Park, New Delhi: Rupa and Co., ISBN 81-7167-194-2
- Sudeep Sen:
  - Mount Vesuvius in Eight Frames, New York City: White Swan Books; Leeds: Peepal Tree, ISBN 0-948833-91-2
  - South African Woodcut, New York City: White Swan Books; Leeds: Peepal Tree, ISBN 0-948833-90-4
- C. P. Surendran, Gemini II, New Delhi: Penguin (Viking)
- Robin Ngangom, Time's Crossroads, Hyderabad: Orient Longman Ltd, ISBN 0-86311-456-3
- Ruth Vanita, A Play of Light: Selected Poems ( Poetry in English ), New Delhi: Penguin India

=== Ireland ===
- Eavan Boland, In a Time of Violence, including "Anna Liffey", "The Black Lace Fan My Mother Gave Me", "The Latin Lesson" and "Midnight Flowers", Carcanet Press
- Vona Groarke, Shale, Oldcastle: The Gallery Press
- Michael Hartnett, Selected and New Poems, including "Bread", "I have exhausted the delighted range ...", "For My Grandmother, Bridget Halpin", "A Farewell to English", "Lament for Tadhg Cronin's Children" and "The Man who Wrote Yeats, the Man who Wrote Mozart", Oldcastle: The Gallery Press
- Medbh McGuckian:
  - Venus and the Rain, revised edition (first edition 1984), Oldcastle: The Gallery Press
  - Captain Lavender, including "Porcelain Bells", Oldcastle: The Gallery Press
- Paula Meehan, Pillow Talk, including "Laburnum", Oldcastle: The Gallery Press
- Eiléan Ní Chuilleanáin, The Brazen Serpent, including "The Real Thing" and "Saint Margaret of Cortona", Oldcastle: The Gallery Press
- Tom Paulin, Walking a Line, including "The Lonely Tower", Faber and Faber, Irish poet published in the United Kingdom

=== New Zealand ===
- Fleur Adcock (New Zealand poet who moved to England in 1963) translator, Hugh Primas and the Archpoet, Cambridge, England, and New York: Cambridge University Press
- Lauris Edmond, Selected Poems, 1975-1994, Wellington: Bridget Williams Books
- Michele Leggott, DIA, Auckland: Auckland University Press; winner of the New Zealand Book Award for Poetry
- Hone Tuwhare, Deep River Talk, 140 poems from 10 previous collections

=== United Kingdom ===
- Fleur Adcock (New Zealand poet who moved to England in 1963) translator, Hugh Primas and the Archpoet, Cambridge, England, and New York: Cambridge University Press
- Eavan Boland, In a Time of Violence
- Alan Brownjohn, In the Cruel Arcade
- Gerry Cambridge, The Dark Gift and Other Poems, St. Inan's Press (16 pages; "I used to produce this tiny pamphlet from my breast pocket at poetry readings, and announce I would read from my complete and unexpurgated works", Cambridge wrote on his website.)
- William Cookson, editor, Agenda – An Anthology 1959-1993, Carcanet Press, ISBN 978-1-85754-069-7
- Carol Ann Duffy:
  - Editor, Anvil New Poets Volume 2 Penguin (anthology), sources also give 1995 and 1996 as publication year
  - Selected Poems Penguin
- Helen Dunmore, Recovering a Body
- Paul Durcan Give Me Your Head
- James Fenton, Out of Danger, Penguin; Farrar Straus Giroux; winner of the Whitbread Prize for Poetry
- Elaine Feinstein, Selected Poems, Carcanet
- Roy Fisher, Birmingham River
- Philip Gross, I.D.
- Adrian Henri, Not Fade Away
- Selma Hill, Trembling Hearts in the Bodies of Dogs
- Kathleen Jamie, The Queen of Sheba
- Alan Jenkins, Harm
- Elizabeth Jennings, Familiar Spirits
- Thomas Kinsella, From Centre City
- Peter Levi, The Rags of Time
- Medbh McGuckian, Captain Lavender
- Derek Mahon, The Yaddo Letter
- Glyn Maxwell, Mick Imlah and Peter Reading, Penguin New Poets 3, ISBN 978-0-14-058742-5
- Andrew Motion, The Price of Everything
- Paul Muldoon:
  - The Annals of Chile
  - The Prince of Quotidian
- Tom Paulin, Walking a Line
- Peter Porter, Millennial Fables
- Craig Raine, History: The Home Movie
- Peter Redgrove, My Father's Trapdoors
- Peter Scupham, The Ark
- Jon Silkin, Watersmeet
- C. H. Sisson, What and Who
- Sir Stephen Spender, Dolphins
- Anthony Thwaite, The Dust of the World
- Hugo Williams, Dock Leaves, Faber and Faber
- Gerard Woodward, After The Deafening

==== Criticism, scholarship and biography in the United Kingdom ====
- John Heath-Stubbs, Hindsights : An Autobiography

=== United States ===
- Kim Addonizio, The Philosopher's Club (BOA Editions)
- A. R. Ammons, The North Carolina Poems
- Maya Angelou, The Complete Collected Poems of Maya Angelou
- John Ashbery, And the Stars Were Shining
- Ted Berrigan, Selected Poems
- Sophie Cabot Black, The Misunderstanding of Nature, (Graywolf Press) received the Poetry Society of America Norma Farber First Book Award, ISBN 1-55597-190-3
- Rosellen Brown, Cora Fry's Pillow Book
- Russell Edson, The Tunnel: Selected Poems of Russell Edson
- Jane Hirshfield, The October Palace
- Edward Hirsch, Earthly Measures
- John Hollander, Animal Poems
- Andrew Hudgins, The Glass Hammer
- Galway Kinnell, Imperfect Thirst (Houghton Mifflin)
- Kenneth Koch:
  - On the Great Atlantic Rainway: Selected Poems, 1950-1988, New York: Knopf
  - One Train: Poems, New York: Knopf
- James McMichael, Each in a Place Apart
- Robert Pinsky, translation of Dante's Inferno
- Wendy Rose, Bone Dance
- Mary Jo Salter, Sunday Skaters
- Patti Smith, Early Work
- Rosmarie Waldrop, A Key Into the Language of America (New Directions Publishers)

==== Criticism, scholarship and biography in the United States ====
- Louise Glück, Proofs & Theories, with pieces on George Oppen, John Berryman, Robinson Jeffers, and Stanley Kunitz
- Ian Hamilton, editor, The Oxford Companion to Twentieth-century Poetry in English, New York: Oxford University Press
- Janet Malcolm, The Silent Woman, a study of Sylvia Plath
- Mary Oliver, A Poetry Handbook
- Carl Woodring, editor, Columbia History of British Poetry, New York: Columbia University Press

==== Anthologies in the United States ====
- Douglas Messerli, editor, From the Other Side of the Century: A New American Poetry, 1960-1990, including American and Canadian poets; Sun and Moon Press (Messerli's own imprint) ISBN 978-1-55713-131-7
- Carolyn Forché, Against Forgetting: Twentieth-Century Poetry of Witness
- Jane Hirshfield, editor, Women in Praise of the Sacred: Forty-Three Centuries of Spiritual Poetry by Women
- Paul Hoover, editor, Postmodern American Poetry (Norton) The introduction identifies the use of postmodern with its early mention by Charles Olson, and identifies the field chosen as experimental poetry from after 1945; about 20 short essays on poetics also included
- E. Ethelbert Miller, In Search of Color Everywhere, including almost 150 African-American poets

===== Poets in The Best American Poetry 1994 anthology =====
Poems from these 75 poets were in The Best American Poetry 1994 edited by David Lehman, guest editor A. R. Ammons:

- Dick Allen
- Tom Andrews
- John Ashbery
- Burlin Barr
- Cynthia Bond
- Catherine Bowman
- George Bradley
- Charles Bukowski
- Rebecca Byrkit
- Amy Clampitt
- Michelle T. Clinton
- James Cummins
- Ramola Dharmaraj
- Thomas M. Disch
- Mark Doty
- Denise Duhamel
- Tony Esolen
- Richard Foerster
- Alice Fulton
- Allison Funk
- Jorie Graham
- Debora Greger
- Donald Hall
- Forrest Hamer
- Lyn Hejinian
- Roald Hoffmann
- John Hollander
- Janet Holmes
- Paul Hoover
- Richard Howard
- Phyllis Janowitz
- Mark Jarman
- Alice Jones
- Rodney Jones
- Brigit Pegeen Kelly
- Caroline Knox
- Kenneth Koch
- Dionisio D. Martínez
- J. D. McClatchy
- Jeffrey McDaniel
- James McManus
- James Merrill
- W. S. Merwin
- Stephen Paul Miller
- Jenny Mueller
- Harryette Mullen
- Brighde Mullins
- Fred Muratori
- Sharon Olds
- Maureen Owen
- Kathleen Peirce
- Carl Phillips
- Lloyd Schwartz
- Frederick Seidel
- Alan Shapiro
- Angela Shaw
- Charles Simic
- William De Witt Snodgrass
- Elizabeth Spires
- A. E. Stallings
- Mark Strand
- Sharan Strange
- May Swenson
- Janet Sylvester
- James Tate
- Patricia Traxler
- William Wadsworth
- Kevin Walker
- Rosanne Wasserman
- Bruce Weigl
- Joshua Weiner
- Henry Weinfield
- Michael White
- Richard Wilbur
- Dean Young

=== Other in English ===
- Vinay Dharwadker and A. K. Ramanujan, editors, The Oxford Anthology of Modern Indian Poetry, Delhi: Oxford University Press

== Works published in other languages ==
Listed by nation where the work was first published and again by the poet's native land, if different; substantially revised works listed separately:

=== Danish ===
- Naja Marie Aidt, Det tredje landskap ("The Third Landscape"), third volume of a poetic trilogy which started with Sålænge jeg er ung ("As Long as I'm Young") 1991, and included Et Vanskeligt mode ("A Difficult Encounter") 1992
- Benny Andersen, Denne kommen og gåen
- Katrine Marie Guldager, Dagene skifter hænder, ("The Days Change Hands"); Denmark
- Vagn Lundbye, Lundbyes dyrefabler
- Pia Tafdrup, Territorialsang
- Ole Wivel, Iris

=== Dutch ===
- Bernlef, Vreemde wil
- Toon Tellegen, Tijger onder de slakken
- Leonard Nolens, Honing en As

=== French language ===
==== Canada ====
- Robert Melançon, L'Avant-printemps à Montréal

==== France ====
- Édouard Glissant, Poèmes complets

=== German ===
- Durs Grünbein, Falten und Fallen
- Jürgen Kolbe, a book of poetry
- Robert Gernhardt, a book of poetry

==== Criticism, scholarship, and biography in Germany ====
- Erich Mühsam, Tagebücher, 1910-1924 (posthumous)

=== Hebrew ===
- Haim Gouri, Ha-Ba Aharai ("Poems"), Israel

=== India ===
Listed in alphabetical order by first name:

- Jiban Narah, O’ Mor Dhuniya Kapou Phul, Guwahati, Assam: Students’ Store; Assamese-language
- Joy Goswami Pagli Tomar Songe, winner of the Sahitya Akademi Award in 2000; Kolkata: Ananda Publishers, ISBN 81-7756-148-0; Bangladeshi-language
- K. Satchidanandan, Malayalam-language:
  - Desatanam, ("Going Places")
  - Kochiyile Vrikshangal, Kozhikode, Kerala: Mulberry Publications; Malayalam-language poet, critic and academic
- K. Siva Reddy, Ajeyam, Hyderabad: Jhari Poetry Circle, Telugu-language
- Nilmani Phookan, Sagartalir Sankha, Selected Poems edited by Hiren Gohain, Guwahati, Assam: Lawyers’ Book Stall; Assamese-language
- Nirendranath Chakravarti, Chollisher Dinguli, Kolkata: Ananda Publishers, Kolkata; Bengali-language
- Rajendra Kishore Panda, Bodhinabha ("The Bodhi-Sky"), Cuttack: Bharat Bharati; in Oraya and in English
- Teji Grover, Lo Kaha Sanbari, New Delhi: National Publishing House, ISBN 81-214-0537-8; Hindi-language
- Thangjam Ibopishak Singh, Bhoot Amasung Maikhum ("The Ghost and Mask"), Imphal: Writer's Forum; Meitei language

=== Poland ===
- Stanisław Barańczak, Podroz zimowa ("Journey in Winter"), Poznan: a5
- Juliusz Erazm Bolek, Serce błyskawicy
- Ewa Lipska, Stypendisci czasu, ("Time's Scholarship Winners"); Wroclaw: Wydawnictwo Dolnoslaskie
- Bronisław Maj, Światło ("Light"); Cracow: Znak
- Eugeniusz Tkaczyszyn-Dycki, Młodzieniec o wzorowych obyczajach
- Czesław Miłosz, Na brzegu rzeki ("Facing the River"); Kraków: Znak
- Adam Zagajewski, Ziemia ognista ("Land in Flames"), Poznañ: A5

=== Spanish language ===
==== Spain ====
- Matilde Camus, Ronda de azules ("Blue avenue")

==== Latin America ====
- Mario Benedetti, Inventario dos (1985–1994) ("Inventory Two (1985–1994)"), published in Madrid, Uruguay
- José Emilio Pacheco, El silencio de la luna, Mexico
- Francisco Hernández, El infierno es un decir, Mexico
- Octavio Paz. Obras completas, Mexico

=== Sweden ===
- Katarina Frostenson, Tankarna
- Ann Jäderlund, Mörker mörka mörkt kristaller
- Arne Johnsson, Faglarnas eldhuvuden

==== Criticism, scholarship and biography in Sweden ====
- Lars Huldén, Carl Michael Bellman, on the 18th-century poet
- Olof Lagercrantz, In Jag bor i en annan värld men du bor ju i samma, about the author's friendship with poet Gunnar Ekelöf
- Lars Gustafsson, Ett minnespalats. Vertikala memoarer., a memoir
- Ylva Eggehorn, Kvarteret Radiomottagaren, a memoir of her childhood

=== Other languages ===
- Hugo Claus, Gedichten 1948-1993, Flemish
- Wang Xiaoni, Fangzhu Shenzhen ("Exile in Shenzhen"), China
- Yi Sha, Esi de shiren ("Poets Starved to Death"), China

== Awards and honors ==
=== Australia ===
- C. J. Dennis Prize for Poetry: Robert Gray, Certain Things
- Dinny O'Hearn Poetry Prize: The Monkey's Mask by Dorothy Porter
- Kenneth Slessor Prize for Poetry: Barry Hill, Ghosting William Buckley
- Mary Gilmore Prize: Aileen Kelly - Coming Up for Light

=== Canada ===
- Gerald Lampert Award: Barbara Klar, The Night You Called Me a Shadow and Ilya Tourtidis, Mad Magellan's Tale
- Archibald Lampman Award: John Newlove, Apology for Absence: Selected Poems 1962–1992
- 1994 Governor General's Awards: Robert Hilles, Cantos from a Small Room (English); Fulvio Caccia, Aknos (French)
- Pat Lowther Award: Diana Brebner, The Golden Lotus
- Prix Alain-Grandbois: Gilbert Langevin, Le Cercle ouvert
- Dorothy Livesay Poetry Prize: Gregory Scofield, The Gathering: Stones for the Medicine Wheel
- Prix Émile-Nelligan: Monique Deland, Géants dans l’île

=== India ===
- Sahitya Akademi Award : Ashok Vajpayee for Kahin Nahin Wohoin
- Poetry Society India National Poetry Competition : Anju Makhija for A Farmer's Ghost

=== United Kingdom ===
- Cholmondeley Award: Ruth Fainlight, Gwen Harwood, Elizabeth Jennings, John Mole
- Eric Gregory Award: Julia Copus, Alice Oswald, Steven Blyth, Kate Clanchy, Giles Goodland
- Forward Poetry Prize (United Kingdom, Best Collection): Alan Jenkins, Harm (Chatto & Windus)
- Forward Poetry Prize (United Kingdom, Best First Collection): Kwame Dawes, Progeny of Air (Peepal Tree)
- T. S. Eliot Prize (United Kingdom and Ireland): Paul Muldoon, The Annals of Chile
- Whitbread Award for poetry: James Fenton, Out of Danger
- National Poetry Competition : David Hart for The Silkies

=== United States ===
- Agnes Lynch Starrett Poetry Prize: Jan Beatty, Mad River
- Aiken Taylor Award for Modern American Poetry: Wendell Berry
- AML Award for poetry to Pamela Porter Hamblin for "Magi"
- Bernard F. Connors Prize for Poetry: Stewart James, "Vanessa", and (separately) Marilyn Hacker, "Cancer Winter"
- Bobbitt National Prize for Poetry: A. R. Ammons, Garbage
- National Book Award for poetry (United States): James Tate, A Worshipful Company of Fletchers
- Pulitzer Prize for Poetry: Yusef Komunyakaa, Neon Vernacular: New and Selected Poems
- Rhysling Awards:
  - W. Gregory Stewart & Robert Frazier, Basement Flats (Long Form)
  - Bruce Boston, Spacer's Compass (Short Form, tie)
  - Jeff VanderMeer, Flight Is for Those Who Have Not Yet Crossed Over (Short Form, tie)
- Ruth Lilly Poetry Prize: Donald Hall
- Wallace Stevens Award inaugurated with first award this year: W. S. Merwin
- Whiting Awards: Mark Doty, Wayne Koestenbaum, Mary Swander
- William Carlos Williams Award: Cyrus Cassells, The Mud Actor
- Fellowship of the Academy of American Poets: David Ferry

=== New Zealand ===
- Montana Book Award for Poetry: Bill Manhire, ed., 100 New Zealand Poems
- New Zealand Book Award for Poetry: Andrew Johnston, How to Talk

=== Other ===
- Norway: Brague Prize: Sigmund Mjelve for Omrade aldri fastlagt

== Deaths ==
Birth years link to the corresponding "[year] in poetry" article:

- January 1 – Chaganti Somayajulu (born 1915), Indian, Telugu-language short-story writer and poet
- February 6 — D.I. Antoniou (born in 1906), Greek poet
- February 20 — Rolf Jacobsen, 86 (born 1907), Norwegian modernist poet
- March 9 — Charles Bukowski, 73 (born 1920), American poet and novelist, of leukemia
- March 29 — Lynda Hull, 49 (born 1955), American poet, in an automobile accident
- May 24 — John Wain, 69 (born 1925), English poet, novelist and critic, of a stroke
- July 5 — Jack Clemo, 78 (born 1916), English poet of Cornwall
- August 28 — David Wright, 74 (born 1920), English poet, of cancer
- September 10 — Amy Clampitt, 74, American poet, of ovarian cancer
- November 28 — Ian Serraillier, 82 (born 1912), English children's writer
- December 12 — Donna J. Stone, 61 (born 1933), American poet and philanthropist, of heart failure
- date not known — Rhoda Bulter (born 1929), Scottish poet of Shetland

== See also ==
- Poetry
- List of years in poetry
- List of poetry awards
