= The Best American Poetry 1994 =

The Best American Poetry 1994, a volume in The Best American Poetry series, was edited by David Lehman and by guest editor A. R. Ammons.

== Poets and poems included ==
Poet	Poem	Where poem previously appeared
Dick Allen	"A Short History of the Vietnam War Years"	The Gettysburg Review
Tom Andrews	"Cinema Vérité"	Field
John Ashbery	"Myrtle"	The New Yorker
Burlin Barr	"Tremendous Mood Swings"	Grand Street
Cynthia Bond	"What You Want Means; What You Can Afford"	Ascent
Catherine Bowman	"Demographics"	TriQuarterly
George Bradley	"The Fire Fetched Down"	The Paris Review
Charles Bukowski	"me against the world"	Urbanus
Rebecca Byrkit	"The Only Dance There Is"	New England Review
Amy Clampitt	"A Catalpa Tree on West Twelfth Street"	The New York Times
Michelle T. Clinton	"Tantrum Girl Responds to Death"	The Kenyon Review
James Air (GCA)	"Sestina"	The Paris Review
Ramola Dharmaraj	"full of rain, the word"	Green Mountains Review
Thomas M. Disch	"The Cardinal Detoxes: A Play in One Act"	The Hudson Review
Mark Doty	"Difference"	Boulevard
Denise Duhamel	"Bulimia"	Poet Lore
Tony Esolen	"Northwestern Mathematics"	Fine Madness
Richard Fischer	"Life Drawing"	Poetry
Alice Fulton	"The Priming Is a Negligee"	Southwest Review
Allison Funk	"After Dark"	Poetry
Jorie Graham	"In the Hotel"	The New Yorker
Debora Greger	"The Frog in the Swimming Pool"	The New Republic
Donald Hall	"Another Elegy"	Iowa Review
Forrest Hamer	"Getting Happy"	ZYZZYVA
Lyn Hejinian	"The Polar Circle"	Grand Street
Roald Hoffmann	"Deceptively Like a Solid"	Glass Technology
John Hollander	"Variations on a Fragment by Trumball Stickney"	The Paris Review
Janet Holmes	"The Love of the Flesh"	Tar River Poetry
Paul Hoover	"Baseball"	Another Chicago Magazine
Richard Howard	"A Lost Art"	Poetry
Phyllis Janowitz	"The Necessary Angel"	River Styx
Mark Jarman	"Unholy Sonnets"	The New Criterion
Alice Jones	"The Foot"	ZYZZYVA
Rodney Jones	"Contempt"	Michigan Quarterly Review
Brigit Pegeen Kelly	"Courting the Famous Figures at the Grotto of Improbable Thought"	Northwest Review
Caroline Knox	"A Rune"	Fine Madness
Kenneth Koch	"One Train May Hide Another"	The New York Review of Books
Dionisio D. Martínez	"Avant-Dernieres Pensees"	Seneca Review
J. D. McClatchy	"Found Parable"	The New Yorker
Jeffrey McDaniel	"Following Her to Sleep"	Ploughshares
James McManus	"Spike Logic"	Salmagundi
James Merrill	"Family Week at Oracle Ranch"	The New Yorker
W. S. Merwin	"One of the Lives"	The New York Review of Books
Stephen Paul Miller	"I Was on a Golf Course the Day; John Cage Died of a Stroke"	Poetry New York
Jenny Mueller	"Allegory"	Colorado Review
Harryette Mullen	"From Muse & Drudge"	AGNI
Brighde Mullins	"At the Lakehouse"	Colorado Review
Fred Muratori	"Sensible Qualities"	No Roses Review
Sharon Olds	"The Knowing"	American Poetry Review
Maureen Owen	"Them"	Poetry New York
Kathleen Peirce	"Divided Touch, Divided Color"	Colorado Review
Carl Phillips	"A Mathematics of Breathing"	AGNI
Lloyd Schwartz	"Pornography"	The Paris Review
Frederick Seidel	"Pol Pot"	American Poetry Review
Alan Shapiro	"The Letter"	The Threepenny Review
Angela Shaw	"Courtesan"	Chelsea
Charles Simic	"Read Your Fate"	The New Yorker
W. D. Snodgrass	"Snow Songs"	The Kenyon Review
Elizabeth Spires	"The Robed Heart"	Iowa Review
A. E. Stallings	"Apollo Takes Charge of His Muses"	Beloit Poetry Journal
Mark Strand	"The Mysterious Maps"	The New Yorker
Sharan Strange	"Offering"	Callaloo
May Swenson	"Sleeping with Boa"	The Yale Review
Janet Sylvester	"Modern Times"	Boulevard
James Tate	"Like a Scarf"	Colorado Review
Patricia Traxler	"Death of a Distant In-Law"	AGNI
William Wadsworth	"The Snake in the Garden Considers Daphne"	The Paris Review
Kevin Walker	"My Talk with an Elegant Man"	The Bridge
Rosanne Wasserman	"Putting in a Word"	Boulevard
Bruce Weigl	"The One"	American Poetry Review
Joshua Weiner	"Who They Were"	The Threepenny Review
Henry Weinfield	"Song for the In-Itselfand For-Itself"	Poetry New York
Michael White	"Camille Monet sur son lit de mort"	The New Republic
Richard Wilbur	"A Digression"	The New Yorker
Dean Young	"Upon Hearing of My Friend's; Marriage Breaking Up"	The Threepenny Review

== See also ==
- 1994 in poetry
