= Thomas Centolella =

American poet and educator

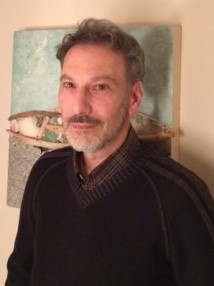
- Citizenship: American
- Occupations: poet and educator
- Writing career
- Language: English
- Genre: poetry
- Notable awards: Guggenheim Fellowship, The Dorset Prize, Lannan Literary Award for Poetry

Thomas Centolella is an American poet and educator. He has published four books of poetry and has had many poems published in periodicals including American Poetry Review. He has received awards for his poetry including those from the National Poetry Series, the American Book Award, the Lannan Literary Award for Poetry and the Dorset Prize. In 2019, he received a Guggenheim Fellowship.

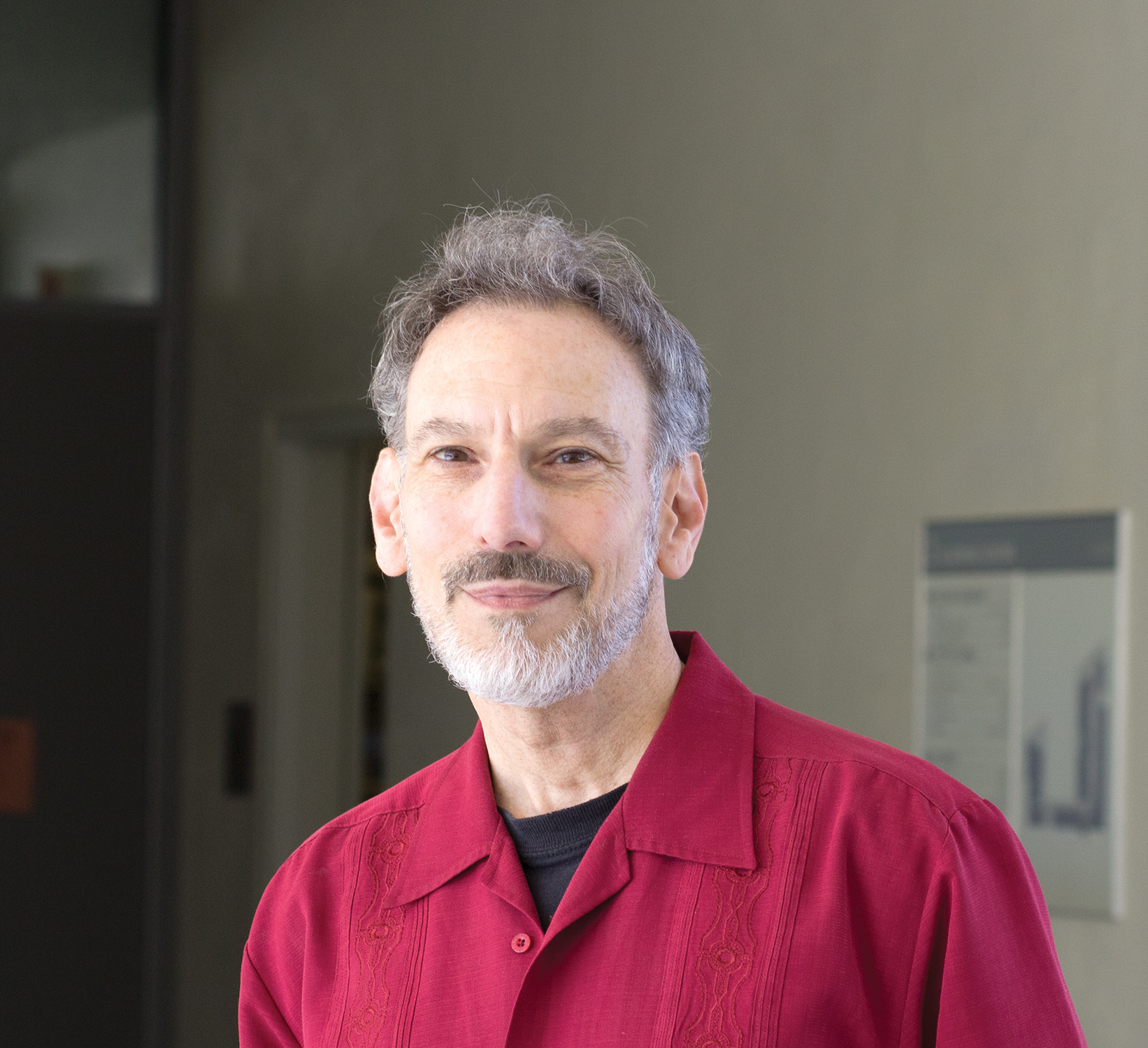
Thomas Centolella

== Life ==
Centolella has published four books of poetry: Terra Firma, Lights & Mysteries, Views from along the Middle Way, and Almost Human. His poetry has appeared in Alaska Quarterly Review, American Poetry Review, Parthenon West Review, Ploughshares, Poetry Northwest, and The Los Angeles Times, among many other periodicals. His poem "View #45", was read at the United Nations as a part of Poets Against the War. "In the evening we shall be examined on love" and "Lines of Force" were featured on Garrison Keillor's Writers' Almanac on NPR.

He has been a visiting writer at many universities and colleges.

Mr. Centolella served as a Wallace Stegner Fellow at Stanford University. He has taught literature and creative writing at San Francisco State University, at the University of California, Berkeley (Extension), at the Institute on Aging (San Francisco), at San Francisco WritersCorps, and in the California Poets in the Schools Program.

He currently lives in San Francisco and teaches at College of Marin and in private workshops.

== Awards ==
- 1990 National Poetry Series (selected by Denise Levertov)
- 1991 American Book Award from the Before Columbus Foundation, and Bay Area Book Reviewers Award (aka, Northern California Book Award).
- 1992 Lannan Literary Award for Poetry.
- 1996 Poetry Medal from the Commonwealth Club of California (aka California Book Award).
- 2015 The Dorset Prize, (selected by Edward Hirsch), Tupelo Press.
- 2019 Guggenheim Fellowship

== Work ==
=== Books ===
- Terra Firma. Copper Canyon Press. 1990. ISBN 978-1-55659-030-6.
- Lights & Mysteries. Copper Canyon Press. 1995. ISBN 978-1-55659-106-8.
- Views from along the Middle Way: poems. Copper Canyon Press. 2002. ISBN 978-1-55659-161-7.
- Almost Human. Tupelo Press, 2017.

=== Anthologies ===
- America, We Call Your Name: Poems of Resistance and Resilience, Sixteen Rivers Press (2018)
- The Place That Inhabits Us: Poems of the San Francisco Bay Watershed, Sixteen Rivers Press (2010)
- Chad Sweeney, ed. (January 2009). Days I Moved Through Ordinary Sounds. City Lights Publishers. ISBN 978-1-931404-10-5.
- Robin Chapman; Judith Strasser, eds. (2007). 75 Poems on Retirement. University of Iowa Press. ISBN 978-1-58729-527-0.
- Justin Daniel Belmont (2005). The Art of Bicycling. Breakaway Books. ISBN 978-1-891369-56-8.
- devorah major, ed. (2004). The Other Side of the Postcard. City Lights Foundation. ISBN 978-1-931404-06-8.
- Regina Barreca, ed. (2002). Don't Tell Mama! The Penguin Book of Italian American Writing. Tandem Library. ISBN 978-1-4177-0459-0.
- Maggie Anderson; David Hassler, eds. (1999). Learning by Heart: Contemporary American Poetry about School. University of Iowa Press. p. 58. ISBN 978-0-87745-663-6.

=== Editor ===
- Grace Grafton, Thomas Centolella, Calif Lakeshore Alternative Elementary School (2002). I Fall Into the Bright, Bright World: Poems. Manic D Press.
- Grace Grafton, Thomas Centolella, Calif Lakeshore Alternative Elementary School (2002). The Irresistible Earth: Poems. Manic D Press.

=== Poetry ===
- "The Raptors". Ploughshares. Spring 1995.
- "The Orders". Ploughshares. Spring 1995.
- "View #45", poemhunter
- "The Secret Life," Poetry Northwest,
- 10 poems, https://www.poetryfoundation.org/poets/thomas-centolella
