= Robert Dana =

American poet

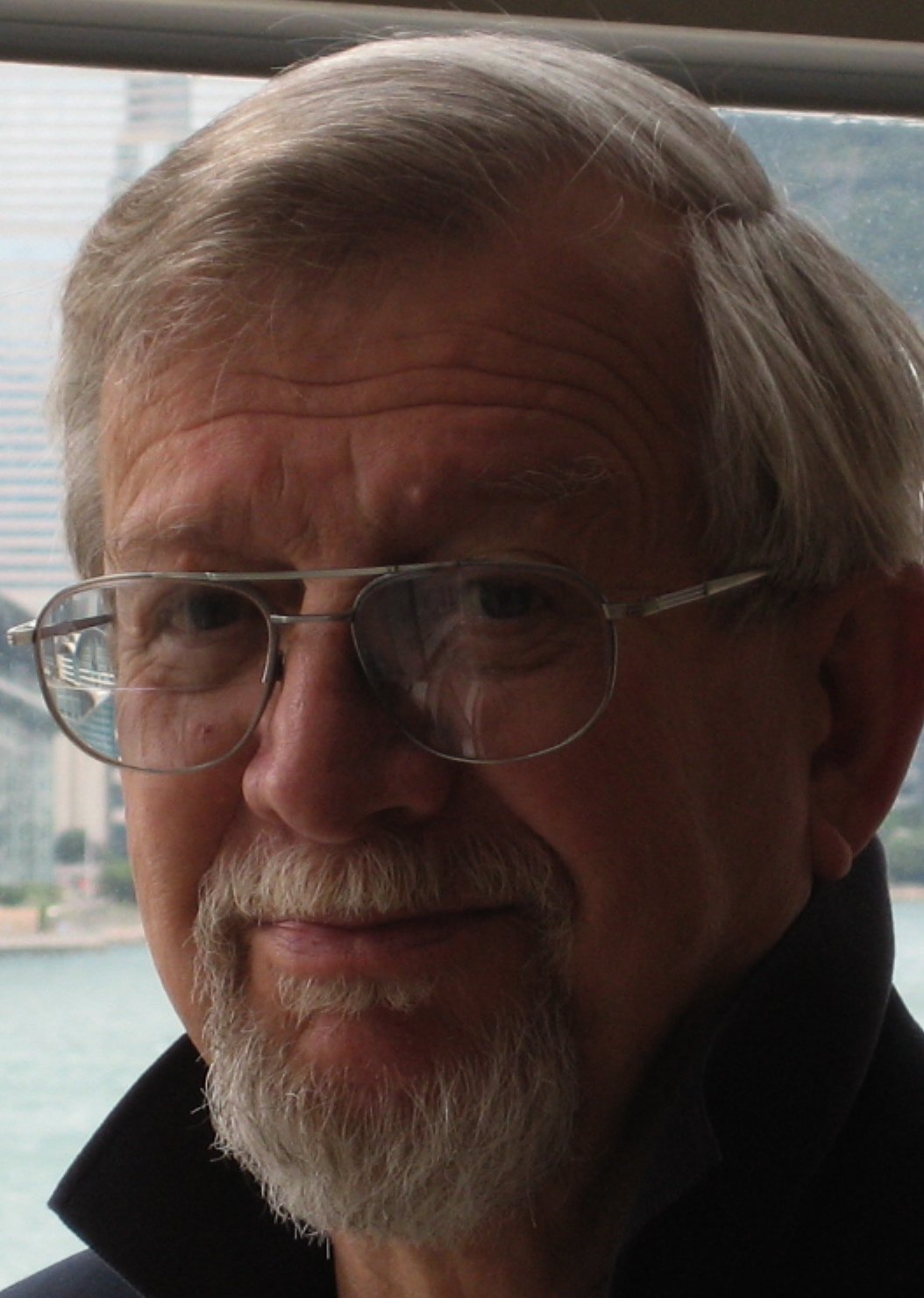
- Born: June 2, 1929; Boston, Massachusetts
- Died: February 6, 2010 (aged 80); Iowa City, Iowa
- Education: University of Iowa; Drake University; Holyoke Junior College
- Awards: poet laureate for the State of Iowa; Two National Endowment of the Arts Fellowships; 1989 Delmore Schwartz Memorial Award from New York University; 1994 Carl Sandburg Medal for Poetry; 1996 Pushcart Prize; Rainer Maria Rilke Prize for Poetry
- Scientific career
- Fields: Poetry
- Workplaces: Cornell College; University of Florida; Wayne State University; University of Idaho; Wichita State University; Stockholm University; Beijing University

Robert Dana (June 2, 1929 – February 6, 2010) was an American poet, who taught writing and English literature at Cornell College and many other schools, revived The North American Review and served as its editor during the years 1964–1968, and was the poet laureate for the State of Iowa from 2004 to 2008.

== Biography ==
Robert Patrick Dana was born in Boston, Massachusetts, in 1929. At the age of seven he became an orphan, and was uprooted and moved to the western part of the state where he was raised as a foster child in the home of James Francis ("Pop") Kearney in Haydenville, Massachusetts. He served in the South Pacific near the end of World War II as a US Navy radio operator, and during lulls in the action found that he loved writing poetry. After being honorably discharged in 1948, he spent a year at Holyoke Junior College on the GI Bill, then sold his raincoat and watch to purchase a one-way bus ticket to Des Moines, Iowa. There he attended Drake University, studying with the poet E. L. Mayo, while supporting himself by working as a sports writer for the Des Moines Register.

Upon graduation, he moved to far northwestern Iowa where he taught school for a year in George, Iowa. He then moved to the other side of the state, studying with Robert Lowell and John Berryman at the University of Iowa and the Iowa Writers' Workshop, where he joined a group of noted writers including Donald Justice, Henri Coulette, Jane Cooper, and Philip Levine. He received his master's degree in 1954, and at the age of 25 was promptly hired by Cornell College, Mount Vernon, Iowa; he remains the youngest person ever hired for a tenure-track faculty position there. He taught writing and English literature at Cornell from 1954 to 1994, eventually serving as both Professor of English and Poet-in-Residence.

In 1964, Dana was responsible for the resumption of the publication of The North American Review. This required negotiating with Claiborne Pell, who was a US Senator from Rhode Island at the time and maintained that he had the rights to the magazine's publication. After successfully concluding those arrangements, Dana served as the NAR's editor until 1968. Ron Sandvik, a later managing editor of the NAR, characterized Dana's role in rescuing it from oblivion as "a huge gift", saying "there are a lot of people who are indebted to him."

Dana also held teaching assignments at a number of other schools, including the University of Florida, Wayne State University, University of Idaho, Wichita State University, Stockholm University, and Beijing University.

Dana published over a dozen collections of his poetry, wrote two prose books and edited a third. In addition, Dana's poetry, essays, and critical reviews have appeared in publications such as The Nation, The New Yorker, The New York Times, The Christian Science Monitor, Poetry, The American Poetry Review, The Iowa Review and the Sewanee Review.

Dana's poetry won a number of awards. His poetry collection Starting Out for the Difficult World was nominated for the Pulitzer Prize in 1988. In 1989, he was the recipient of the Delmore Schwartz Memorial Award for Poetry, given by New York University for a poet who was "insufficiently recognized". He received the Carl Sandburg Medal for Poetry in 1994, a Pushcart Prize in 1996, and the Rainer Maria Rilke Prize for Poetry. He was also the recipient of two National Endowment for the Arts Fellowships (1985 and 1993). In September 2004, Robert Dana was named poet laureate for the State of Iowa, serving until 2008.

Fellow poet Marvin Bell said that Dana "went about his life and work without getting caught up in the petty rivalries of the poetry world".

M.L. Rosenthal, the prominent critic and champion of poetry, felt that Dana was a "richly lyrical poet" who was "very hard on himself and on the Karma of our world, whose work this whole country would recognize itself in, if it ever started to open books of poems."

Dana married twice, the first time for 22 years to Mary (Kowalke) Dana (later, Ware); the second time for 35 years to Peg (Sellen) Dana. He had three children from his first marriage: Lori Dana, Arden Dana, and Richard Dana. He answered editing questions about his forthcoming book Paris on the Flats the day before he died of pancreatic cancer at Mercy Hospice in Iowa City at the age of 80.

== Bibliography ==
=== Poetry ===
- My Glass Brother and Other Poems (Constance Press/Stonewall Press, 1957)
- The Dark Flags of Waking (Qara Press, 1964)
- Journeys from the Skin (The Hundred Pound Press, 1966)
- Some Versions of Silence (W. W. Norton & Company, 1967)
- The Power of the Visible (The Swallow Press, 1971)
- Voyages to the Inland Sea #3: Essays and poems by R.E. Sebenthal, Thomas McGrath, Robert Dana, Center for Contemporary Poetry, 1973.
- In a Fugitive Season: A Sequence of Poems (Ohio University Press 1980)
- What the Stones Know (Seamark Press, 1982)
- Blood Harvest (Windhover Press, 1986)
- Starting Out for the Difficult World (Harper & Row, 1987)
- What I Think I Know: New and Selected Poems (Another Chicago Press, 1991)
- Yes, Everything (Another Chicago Press, 1994)
- Hello, Stranger: Beach Poems (Anhinga Press, 1996)
- Summer (Anhinga Press, 2000)
- The Morning of the Red Admirals (Anhinga Press, 2004)
- The Other (Anhinga Press, 2008)
- New & Selected Poems 1955 to 2010 (Anhinga Press, 2010 - posthumously)

=== Prose ===
- Against the Grain: Interviews with Maverick American Publishers (University of Iowa Press, 1986 and 2009)
- A Community of Writer’s: Paul Engle and the Iowa Writers’ Workshop editor (University of Iowa Press, 1999)
- Paris on the Flats: Versions of a Literary Life (University of Tampa Press, 2010 - posthumously)
