= Marsh Hawk Press =

American self-sustaining independent, non-profit, literary press

- Status: Active
- Founded: 2001
- Founders: Jane Augustine, Thomas Fink, Burt Kimmelman, Sandy McIntosh, and Stephen Paul Miller
- Country of origin: United States
- Headquarters location: East Rockaway, New York
- Distribution: Worldwide
- Key people: Sandy McIntosh, publisher
- Publication types: Books: poetry, memoir; website: Marsh Hawk Press Review, Three Questions Series
- Official website: marshhawkpress.org

Marsh Hawk Press, is a self-sustaining American independent, non-profit, literary press run by publisher Sandy McIntosh in East Rockaway, New York.

Marsh Hawk Press was founded by Jane Augustine, Thomas Fink, Burt Kimmelman, Sandy McIntosh, and Stephen Paul Miller, as a juried collective and literary resource to produce books which highlight the affinity of poetry, memoir and the visual arts. A small press with "a willingness to explore the outermost bounds of American literary culture with each new venture, despite few resources and few expectations of turning substantial profits," titles are produced with particular care for visual style, often including reproductions of artwork alongside poems. The press has sponsored readings and exhibits, an online magazine, and has approximately 100 titles in print. An advisory board of writers includes Toi Derricotte, Denise Duhamel, Marilyn Hacker, Maria Mazziotti Gillan, Alicia Ostriker, Marie Ponsot, David Shapiro, Nathaniel Tarn, Anne Waldman and John Yau.

The press has earned funding from the New York State Council on the Arts, the Council of Literary Magazines and Presses, and by private individuals and foundations, such as the Daniel and Joanna S. Rose Fund.

== Notable authors and honors ==
The Jaguars That Prowl Our Dreams by Mary Mackey, won the Eric Hoffer Award for the Best Book Published by a Small Press. Sugar Zone by Mary Mackey, won the PEN Oakland-Josephine Miles Award for Excellence in Literature. Steve Fellner’s first book of poems, Blind Date with Cavafy won the Thom Gunn Award for Gay Male Poetry. Eileen Tobias' I Take Thee, English, for My Beloved, was awarded the Calatagan Award by Philippine American Writers and Arts. Authors have received John Simon Guggenheim and NEA fellowships, and poems have been chosen for publication in other media. Notable authors include Phillip Lopate, New York Times bestseller Mary Mackey, Sharon Dolin, Harriet Zinnes, Eileen Tabios, Stephen Paul Miller, Chard deNiord, Geoffrey O’Brien, Paul Pines, and Steve Fellner.

== Awards and manuscript selection ==
The press selects manuscripts for publication through its three national, annual awards judged by a poet of national stature such as Marge Piercy: the Marsh Hawk Press Poetry Prize, which includes a cash award and publication of the book; The Robert Creeley Memorial Prize and the Rochelle Ratner Memorial Prize, which also include cash awards.
