= Susan Tichy =

American poet (born 1952)

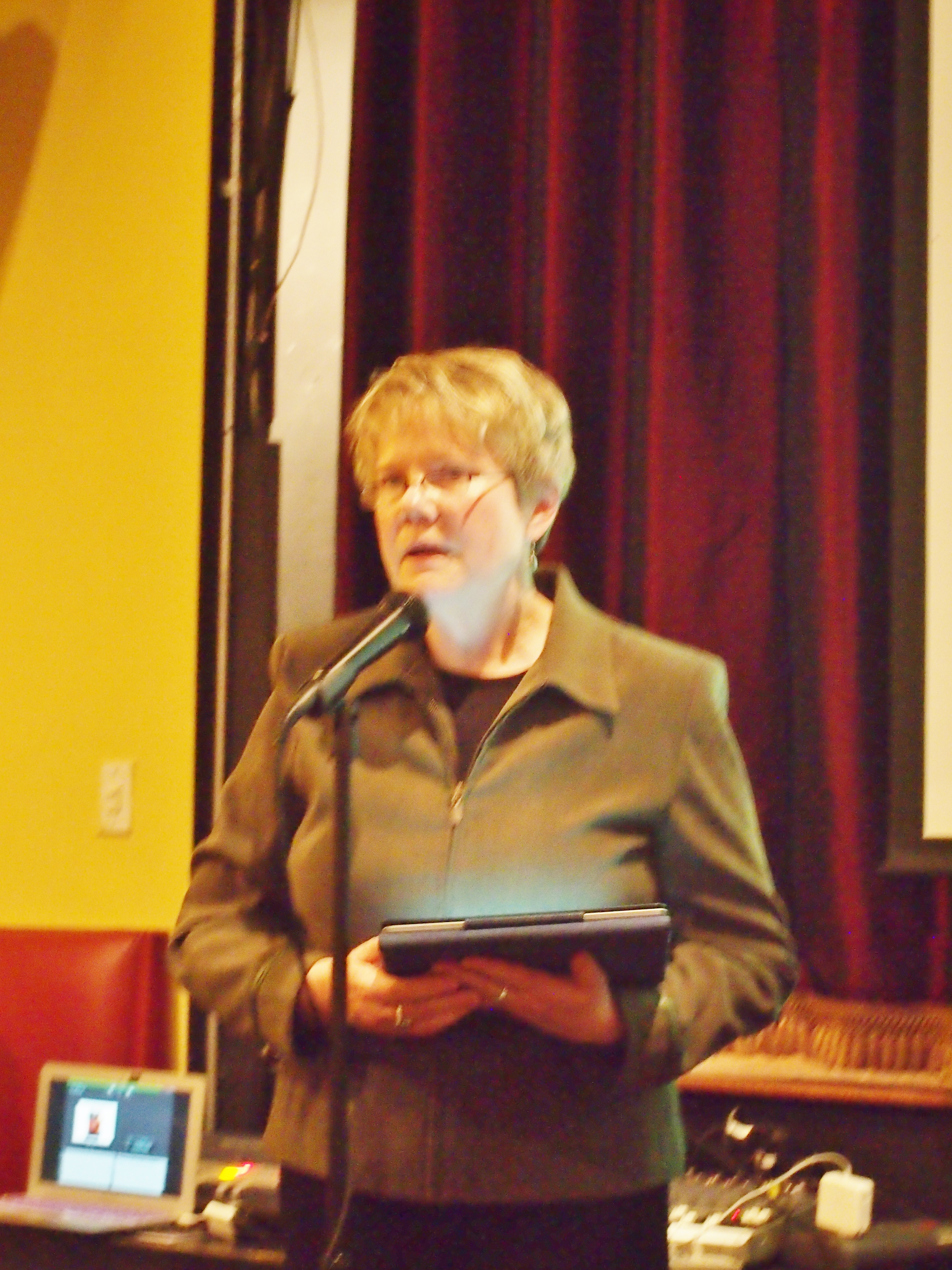
- Born: April 25, 1952 (age 74); Washington, D.C.
- Education: Goddard College; University of Colorado Boulder
- Writing career
- Genre: Poetry
- Notable awards: 1982 National Poetry Series

Susan Elizabeth Tichy (born 25 April 1952, in Washington, D.C.) is an American poet.

== Life ==
She received a B.A. from Goddard College and an M.A. from the University of Colorado Boulder, and is a Full Professor at George Mason University, where she has taught since 1988 in the MFA and undergraduate programs. For five years she was Executive Producer of Poetry Theater: An Evening of Visual Poetics, and also served as poetry editor for the short-lived but gorgeously produced journal, "'Practice: New Writing + Art," based in the Bay area.

Her work has appeared in AGNI, Beloit Poetry Journal, Cerise Press, Colorado Review, Court Green, CutBank, Denver Quarterly, Fascicle, Free Verse, Hotel Amerika, Indiana Review, Ploughshares, 42opus, Runes, and other journals.

She also lives in the southern Colorado Rockies.

== Awards ==
- 1982 National Poetry Series, for The Hands in Exile
- Eugene Kayden Award
- National Endowment for the Arts Fellowship
- Chad Walsh Prize from Beloit Poetry Journal
- Indiana Review Prize for Poetry
- Runes Prize for Poetry
- Quarter After Eight Prize for Innovative Prose

== Works ==
- "VERSARI", Beltway Poetry Quarterly
- A Smell of Burning Starts the Day. Wesleyan University Press. 1988. ISBN 978-0-8195-1154-6.
- The Hands in Exile. Random House. 1983. ISBN 978-0-394-52977-6.
- Bone Pagoda. Ahsahta Press. 2007. ISBN 978-0-916272-91-3.
- Gallowglass. Ahsahta Press. 2010. ISBN 978-1-934103-13-5.
- Trafficke. Ahsahta Press. 2015. ISBN 978-1-934103-60-9.

=== Anthologies ===
- William J. Walsh, ed. (2006). Under the rock umbrella: contemporary American poets, 1951-1977. Mercer University Press. ISBN 978-0-88146-047-6.
- Dave Smith; David Bottoms, eds. (1985). The Morrow anthology of younger American poets. Photographer David Bottoms. Quill. ISBN 978-0-688-03450-4.
