= Anhinga Press =

- Founded: 1972
- Founder: Van Brock
- Country of origin: United States
- Headquarters location: Tallahassee, Florida
- Publication types: books
- Fiction genres: poetry
- Official website: www.anhinga.org

Anhinga Press is an American, independent, literary press located in Tallahassee, Fla. The press began in 1972 as an outgrowth of the Apalachee Poetry Center, a non-profit organization promoting the reading and understanding of poetry. In 1976, founder and poet, Van Brock, expanded the scope of the press by publishing poetry chapbooks. From 1976 through 1981, Anhinga Press published eight chapbooks by regional Florida poets. In 1981, the press published its first full-length volume of poems "Counting the Grasses" by Michael Mott, and today publishes the winners of its two book award contests as well as manuscripts chosen by its board. Rick Campbell, author of four poetry collections, is Director of Anhinga Press.

Notable authors published by Anhinga Press include Frank X. Gaspar, Janet Holmes, David Kirby (poet), Judith Kitchen, Chad Sweeney, Naomi Shihab Nye, Ruth L. Schwartz, Robert Dana, Erika Meitner, Silvia Curbelo and Diane Wakoski. Anhinga Press' titles have been reviewed in venues including Mid-American Review, Poetry Flash, Rattle, Cold Front Magazine, and Story South, and featured on Poetry Daily, Verse Daily, and the National Book Critic's Circle blog, Critical Mass, and reprinted in anthologies including The Best American Poetry.

The press publishes the winners of its national poetry competition, the Robert Dana-Anhinga Prize for Poetry, as well as manuscripts accepted through general submission and the winner of the Levine Prize in Poetry, administered by California State University, Fresno.
