= Tarpaulin Sky Press =

- Founded: 2006
- Founder: Christian Peet
- Country of origin: United States
- Headquarters location: Grafton, Vermont
- Distribution: Small Press Distribution
- Publication types: Books, literary journals
- Official website: tarpaulinsky.com

Tarpaulin Sky Press is a small press publisher of hybrid texts as well as poetry and prose. Founded by Christian Peet in 2006 and based in Grafton, Vermont, the company produces full-length books, chapbooks, trade paperbacks, hand-bound books, and a literary journal that appears in online and paper editions. Their trade paperbacks are distributed by Small Press Distribution, where three titles have appeared on the distributor's "bestsellers" list, including Danielle Dutton's Attempts at a Life, which stayed on the list for seven months. In addition to Dutton's book, the press's titles include the first full-length work of fiction by poet Joyelle McSweeney, Nylund, the Sarcographer; a collaborative book of poetry by Noah Eli Gordon and Joshua Marie Wilkinson, with images by Noah Saterstrom, Figures for a Darkroom Voice; hand-bound and perfect-bound editions of the second book by Jenny Boully, [one love affair]*; and hand-bound and perfect-bound editions of the first full-length collection of poems by Max Winter, The Pictures. The press's chapbooks include prose poetry and verse by Sandy Florian, Andrew Michael Roberts, and Chad Sweeney.

According to a Poets & Writers feature on small presses, Tarpaulin Sky editors are "intrigued by work that doesn’t announce its genre," and they "enjoy found items, lists, odd constraints and mathematical constructs." They are "happy to read texts that are distinctly un-poetic . . . indices, email, job descriptions, instruction manuals, etc."; but, as a caveat, they also offer this: "We’re looking for work in which experimentation with language and form is a means to an end, rather than an end unto itself; innovation alone doesn’t do much for us." The press's books have been described as "fresh, daring, creepy, and significant.... The opposite of boring....an ominous conflagration devouring the bland terrain of conventional realism, the kind of work that tickles your inner ear, gives you the shivers, and tricks your left brain into thinking that your right brain has staged a coup d'état."

In November 2007, after thirteen online issues, Tarpaulin Sky Press published the first paper edition of its literary journal, Tarpaulin Sky (established as an online journal in 2002). Since its creation, the journal has published over three hundred writers including Chris Abani, Brian Evenson, Matthea Harvey, Douglas A. Martin, Ethan Paquin, Eleni Sikelianos, Juliana Spahr, and John Yau, among others. Since 2006, the content of the online journal has been curated by guest editors including Rebecca Brown, Bhanu Kapil, and Selah Saterstrom.

== See also ==
- List of literary magazines
