= Ruth L. Schwartz =

American poet (born 1962)

- Born: 1962 (age 63–64); Geneva, New York, U.S.
- Education: Wesleyan University (BA); University of Michigan (MFA); University of Integrative Learning (PhD)
- Occupation: Poet

Ruth L. Schwartz (born 1962 Geneva, New York) is an American poet, memoirist, personal growth author and teacher.

== Education ==
She graduated with a B.A. from Wesleyan University; an M.F.A. from the University of Michigan; and, a Ph.D. in Transpersonal Psychology from the University of Integrative Learning.

== Career ==
Her most recent poetry collection is Miraculum (Autumn House Press, 2012.) She is also the author of Soul on Earth: A Guide To Living & Loving Your Human Life (Six Directions Press, 2012) and Conscious Lesbian Dating & Love (Six Directions Press, 2015), as well as a memoir, Death In Reverse: A Love Story (Michigan State University Press, 2003.)

She is the founder and director of the Conscious Girlfriend Academy, an international online academy and community focused on supporting lesbian relationships and dating.

She has taught at Cleveland State University, Goddard College, Mills College, California State University-Fresno, California College of the Arts. She teaches at Ashland University, and offers workshops and one-on-one mentoring on the theme of The Writer As Shaman nationwide. She lives in Oakland, California.

== Personal life ==
The San Francisco Bay Area has been Schwartz's chosen home since 1985; she has also traveled extensively in Latin America, and speaks fluent Spanish.

== Awards ==
- NEA Fellowship
- Ohio Arts Council Fellowship
- Astraea Foundation Fellowship
- two Nimrod/Neruda awards
- 2000 Chelsea Magazine Editor's awards
- a Reader's Choice award from Prairie Schooner
- New Letters Literary Award
- Randall Jarrell Award from the North Carolina Writer's Network
- Sue Saniel Elkin award from Kalliope Magazine
- AWP award
- 2000 Anhinga Prize for Poetry
- 2001 National Poetry Series, for Edgewater
- 2005 Autumn House Press Prize for Dear Good Naked Morning

== Published works ==
=== Full-length poetry collections ===
- Dear Good Naked Morning. Autumn House Press. 2005. ISBN 978-1-932870-03-9.
- Death in Reverse: A Love Story. Michigan State University Press. 2004. ISBN 978-0-87013-706-8.
- Edgewater. Harper Collins. 2002. ISBN 978-0-06-008253-6.
- Singular Bodies. Anhinga Press. 2001. ISBN 978-0-938078-69-2.
- Accordion Breathing and Dancing. University of Pittsburgh Press. 1996. ISBN 978-0-8229-3898-9.

=== Anthology publications ===
- Billy Collins, ed. (2003). Poetry 180: a turning back to poetry. Random House Trade Paperbacks. ISBN 978-0-8129-6887-3.
- Kevin Prufer, ed. (2000). The new young American poets: an anthology. SIU Press. ISBN 978-0-8093-2309-8.
- Patrice Vecchione, ed. (2002). "Possible". The body eclectic: an anthology of poems. Macmillan. ISBN 978-0-8050-6935-8.
