= Sandy McIntosh =

American poet

- Born: Rockville Centre, New York
- Education: Waldorf School, New York Military Academy; BA, Southampton College, Long Island University; MFA, The School of the Arts, Columbia University; Ph.D., Union Institute & University
- Occupations: Poet; memoirist; writer; publisher; software developer
- Known for: Managing editor and publisher, Marsh Hawk Press; poet, writer, Hampton's art colony memoirist, insights garnered from going to New York Military Academy with Donald Trump, writing software including "Mavis Beacon Teaches Typing"
- Website: http://sandymcintosh.info/

Sandy McIntosh is an American poet, editor, memoirist, software developer, and teacher.

== Early life and education ==
McIntosh was born in Rockville Centre, New York. He attended the Waldorf School until seventh grade, when he was enrolled at the New York Military Academy, from which he graduated, at the suggestion of Fred Trump, a business acquaintance of McIntosh's father. Trump's son Donald was told to help the younger McIntosh navigate school. McIntosh, an underclassman, was enrolled because his father felt he needed to get rid of "all that spiritual nonsense" of his Waldorf School education. McIntosh has written and been interviewed extensively about how the New York Military Academy's culture of hazing formed Donald Trump's behavior.

He received a BA from Southampton College, L.I.U., an MFA from The School of the Arts, Columbia University and a Ph.D. from the Union Institute & University. While at Southampton College, McIntosh participated in informal apprenticeships with the poet David Ignatow and the poet, novelist and translator H. R. Hays.

== Career ==
A poet, memoirist and writer known for wry reconsideration of the familiar, his work has appeared in The New York Times, The Daily Beast, the New York Daily News, The Wall Street Journal, American Book Review, Talisman: A Journal of Contemporary Poetry and Poetics, in print, and in online journals. His interviews include Phillip Lopate, and Carlos Castaneda scholar and Native American Activist, Jay Courtney Fikes.

McIntosh headed up the H.R. Hays Distinguished Poets series at Guild Hall from 1980 to 2000. His original poetry in a screenplay won the silver medal in the Film Festival of the Americas. His collaboration with Denise Duhamel, 237 More Reasons to Have Sex, appears in The Best American Poetry. His Escape from the Fat Farm was Short Listed for the 2026 Eric Hoffer Book Award Grand Prize.

In the early 1980s, he edited Wok Talk, a Chinese cooking periodical published by Newsletter Publishing Associates and created an early computer software recipe program, The Best of Wok Talk. Martin Yan wrote frequently for the publication. McIntosh took a job with The Software Toolworks, which had published his cooking program, where he helped develop the best-selling program Mavis Beacon Teaches Typing!. His work included writing 750 typing lessons and an extensive user's guide. He has been interviewed in twenty national and international television documentaries concerning Donald Trump.

From 1990 to 2000 he was Managing Editor of Confrontation, a literary magazine published by Long Island University; and a former literature and creative writing professor at Hofstra University and Long Island University. Since 2001, he has served as Executive Editor and Publisher of Marsh Hawk Press.

== Selected bibliography ==
=== Memoir ===
- Escape from the Fat Farm, Poetry and Prose, Marsh Hawk Press; May 1, 2025 ISBN 979-8987617779
- Plan B: A Poet's Survivors Manual, Chapter One Series, Marsh Hawk Press; May 1, 2022; ISBN 978-0-9969912-9-2
- Lesser Lights: More Tales From a Hampton's Apprenticeship, Marsh Hawk Press; February 1, 2019; ISBN 978-0-9969911-3-1
- A Hole In the Ocean: A Hamptons' Apprenticeship, Marsh Hawk Press, 2016, ISBN 0990666999
- Mcintosh, Sandy (August 14, 2020). "The year Trump went astray: A former New York Military Academy classmate on the emergence of a self-promoter". New York Daily News.
- Mcintosh, Sandy (August 11, 2017). "How Young Donald Trump Was Slapped and Punched Until He Made His Bed". New York Daily News.
- I Showered With Donald Trump at Military School, the Daily Beast, April 13, 2017
- What Would Donald Trump Do To The White House?, Long Island Press, August 5, 2016
- For Artists and Poets, the East End Is No Dead End—Just Another ‘Hole in the Ocean’, Long Island Press, February 8, 2016
- Culture of Hazing: Donald Trump, Me, & The End Of New York Military Academy, Long Island Press, October 5, 2015
- Fond Memories of a Poet-Mentor, New York Times, November 30, 1997

=== Poetry ===
- Obsessional, Poetry for Performance, Marsh Hawk Press, 2017 ISBN 098463536X
- Cemetery Chess, Selected and New Poems Marsh Hawk Press, 2012 ISBN 0996427597
- Ernesta, in the Style of the Flamenco, Marsh Hawk Press, 2010 ISBN 0984117717
- 237 More Reasons to Have Sex (written with Denise Duhamel), Otoliths, 2008 ISBN 0980602505
- Forty-Nine Guaranteed Ways To Escape Death, Marsh Hawk Press, 2007 ISBN 0979241618
- The After-Death History of My Mother, Marsh Hawk Press, 2005, ASIN B000VDI4XQ
- Between Earth and Sky. Marsh Hawk Press, 2002, ASIN B001V78ZS0, ISBN 097133322X
- Endless Staircase, Street Press, 1991, ISBN 0935252487
- Monsters of the Antipodes, Survivors Manual Books, 1980
- Which Way to the Egress?, Garfield Publishers, 1974
- Earthworks, Southampton College, Long Island University, 1970

=== Non-fiction ===
- Firing Back: Power Strategies for Cutting the Best Deal When You're About to Lose Your Job, with Jodie-Beth Galos, John Wiley & Sons, 1997 ISBN 0471180319
- The Poets in the Poets-in-the-Schools Minnesota Center for Social Research, University of Minnesota, 1980
- Confrontation Thirtieth Anniversary Anthology, with Martin Tucker, 1998 ISBN 0913057509

=== Cooking ===
- From A Chinese Kitchen, The American Cooking Guild, 1985, ISBN 0942320204
- The Best of Wok Talk. [Computer]. Los Angeles: The Software Toolworks, 1984

=== Editing and translating ===
- The Selected Poems of H.R. Hays, Xlibris Corporation, 2000, ASIN B0793SHQF8
- Selected Gosho Passages of Nichiren Daishonin (modern English renderings), Nichiren Shoshu: Commemorative Committee, 2015
- Basic Terminology of Nichiren Shoshu (modern English renderings), Nichiren Shoshu: Publication Department, 2009
- On Becoming a Poet: Chapter One series, Marsh Hawk Press, 2022 ISBN 978-1-7326141-3-0
- Quest: A Writer's Journey: Chapter One series, Marsh Hawk Press, 2025
- The Gift of Possibility: Writers on Writing, Marsh Hawk Press, 2027

== Awards and prizes ==
- Short List: The 2026 Eric Hoffer Book Award Grand Prize, Escape From the Fat Farm
- Selection: The Best American Poetry, 237 More Reasons to Have Sex (collaboration with Denise Duhamel)
- Silver Medal: Film Festival of the Americas, script award for Ireland: The People and the Caring
- Fellowship: The John Steinbeck Memorial Library Studio, Southampton College
