= Erika Meitner =

American poet (born 1975)

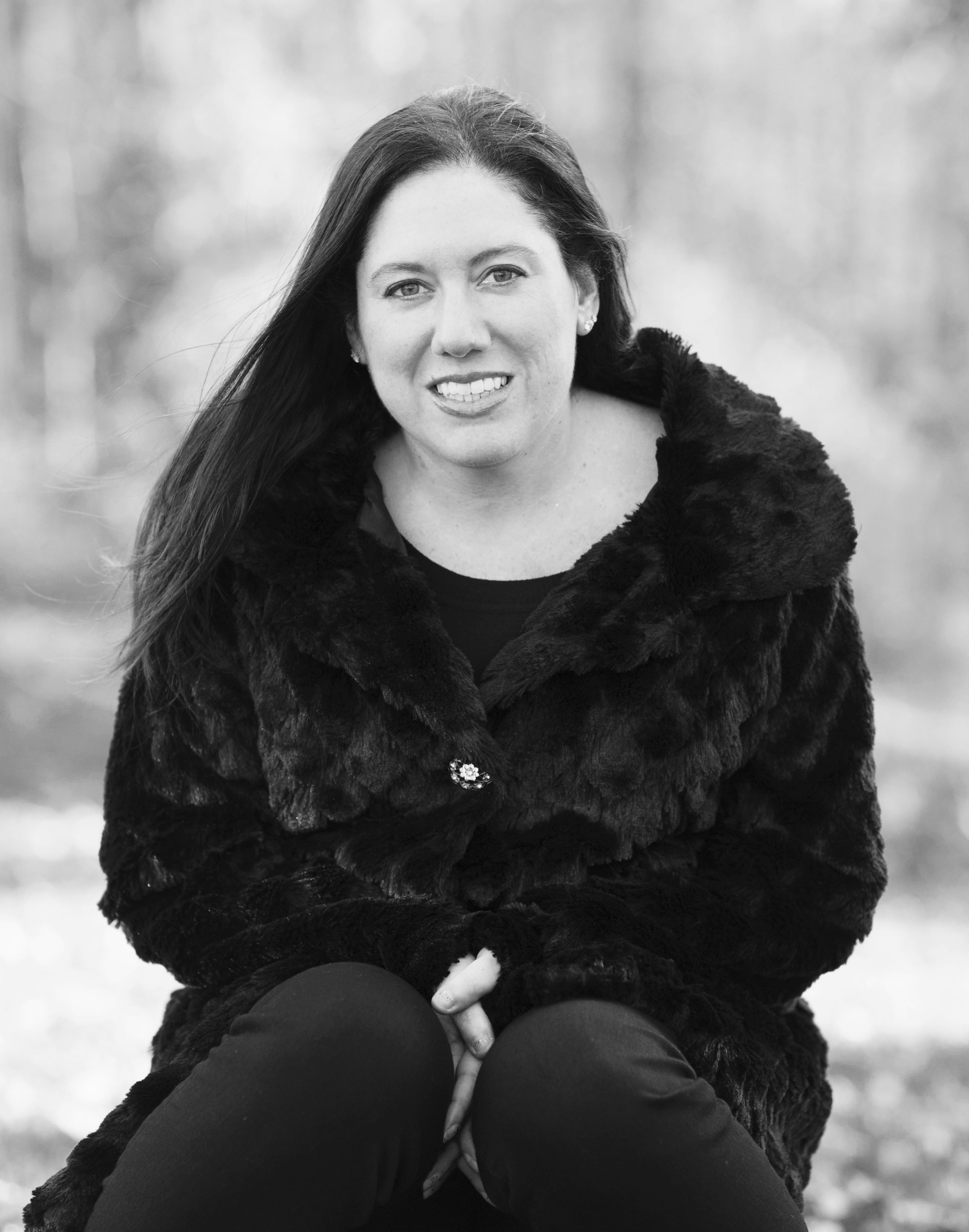
- Erika Meitner, 2016
- Born: 1975 (age 50–51); New York
- Education: Dartmouth College, 1996 A.B. University of Virginia, M.F.A.
- Occupations: Poet, author, professor of English at University of Wisconsin-Madison
- Spouse(s): Steven Trost, married on April 22, 2006
- Website: erikameitner.com

Erika Meitner (born 1975 in New York) is an American poet.

== Life ==
She graduated from Dartmouth College with an A.B. in 1996, and from the University of Virginia with an MFA in creative writing, and an MA in religious studies.

She taught at University of Virginia, University of California, Santa Cruz., and Virginia Tech She was a Fulbright Scholar in Creative Writing, at Queen's University Belfast. She teaches at the University of Wisconsin-Madison.

Her work has appeared in The Southern Review, The American Poetry Review, Shenandoah, Indiana Review, Alaska Quarterly Review, and Virginia Quarterly Review.

== Bibliography ==
=== Poetry ===
Collections

- Inventory at the All-Night Drugstore, Anhinga Press, 2003. ISBN 978-0-938078-74-6
- Ideal Cities, HarperCollins, 2010. ISBN 978-0-06-199518-7
- Makeshift Instructions for Vigilant Girls, Anhinga Press, 2011. ISBN 9781934695234
- Copia, BOA Editions, 2014. ISBN 978-1-938160-46-2
- Holy Moly Carry Me, BOA Editions, 2018. ISBN 9781942683629
- Useful Junk, BOA Editions, 2022. ISBN 978-1-950774-53-1

List of poems

Title	Year	First published	Reprinted/collected
To gather together	2021	Meitner, Erika (October 4, 2021). "To gather together". The New Yorker. 97 (31): 60–61.	

- "The Book of Dissolution", AGNI online
- "Big Box Encounter", Slate, April 20, 2010
- "January Towns"; "With/out", Anti-
- "Quisiera Declarar", From the Fishouse
- "Elegy with Construction Sounds, Water, Fish", Virginia Quarterly Review, Spring 2010, pp. 202–203

=== Essays ===
- "On Rita Dove", Women Poets on Mentorship: Efforts and Affections, Editors Arielle Greenberg, Rachel Zucker, University of Iowa Press, 2008, ISBN 978-1-58729-639-0
- "On Rita Dove", Best African American Essays 2010, Editors Gerald Early, Randall Kennedy, Random House, Inc., 2009, ISBN 978-0-553-38537-3

———————

== Awards ==
- 2009 National Poetry Series, for Ideal Cities
- 2018 National Jewish Book Award: Poetry, for Holy Moly Carry Me
- 2018 Finalist: National Book Critics Circle Award: Poetry, for Holy Moly Carry Me
- 2019 Finalist: Library of Virginia: Poetry, for Holy Moly Carry Me
