= Maurice English =

American poet and journalist (1909 –1983)

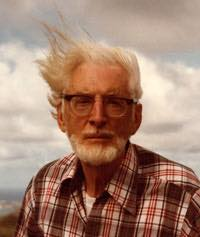
Maurice English 1982

Maurice English (October 21, 1909 – November 18, 1983) was a poet, journalist, and author who is noted for having headed the presses of the University of Chicago, Temple University, and the University of Pennsylvania.

Following his death, English’s family established the Maurice English Poetry Award, which honors an author in his or her sixth decade of life (fifty or beyond) for a distinguished book of poems published during the preceding calendar year. The award acknowledges that English's first volume of poetry, Midnight in the Century, was published in his 55th year. It carries an honorarium of $3,000 and a request for a public reading in Philadelphia. The MEPAward was first given in 1985 to Jane Cooper for Scaffolding: New and Selected Poems (1985).

== Selected publications ==
- Sullivan, Louis H.; English, Maurice (1963). The Testament of Stone: Themes of Idealism and Indignation from the Writings of Louis Sullivan. Evanston, Illinois: Northwestern University Press.
- English, Maurice (1964). Midnight in the Century. Park Forest, Illinois: Prairie School Press.
- English, Maurice (1971). In Our Time. Philadelphia, Pennsylvania: Temple University Press.

== Recipients of the Maurice English Poetry Award ==
- 1985: Jane Cooper, Scaffolding: New and Selected Poems
- 1986: Linda Pastan, A Fraction of Darkness
- 1987: Philip Booth, Relations
- 1988: David Ray, Sam's Book.
- 1989: Jean Valentine, Home Deep Blue: New and selected poems.
- 1990: W. S. Merwin, Selected Poems
- 1991: Richard Fein, Kafka's Ear
- 2001: Kay Ryan, Say Uncle
- 2002: Robert Bly, The Night Abraham Called to the Stars
- 2003: Samuel Hazo, Just Once: New and Selected Poems
- 2004: R. T. Smith, The Hollow Log Lounge
- 2005: Caroline Knox, He Paves the Road with Iron Bars
