= Maxine Cassin =

American poet (1927–2010)

Maxine Cassin (1927–2010) was a poet, editor, and publisher who influenced and published many New Orleans poets, most notably Everette Maddox, founder of the Maple Leaf Bar poetry reading series.

== Biography ==
Maxine Cassin was born in New Orleans in 1927 of Armenian and Jewish descent. She attended the all-women's Newcomb College (now part of Tulane University), earning an M.A. in philosophy. In 1954, she married Joe Cassin, a survivor of the Bataan Death March during World War II; they have one son.

In the 1950s, Cassin and Richard Ashman edited the New Orleans Poetry Journal. Contributors included William Stafford, Donald Hall, Judson Jerome, Sylvia Plath, and Vassar Miller. The journals' press published Miller's Adam's Footprint (1956) and Struggling to Swim on Concrete (1984), as well as collections by Maddox, Raeburn Miller, Martha McFerren, Tom Wright, Harold Witt, Felix Stefanile, Rosewell Graves Lowrey, Charles L. Black, Ralph Adamo, Charles DeGravelles (a later co-editor of the press), and Paul Petrie. She also published Malaika Favorite's poetry and art, as well as Clarence John Laughlin's photographs. Cassin, along with Maddox and Yorke Corbin, also edited the first Maple Leaf Rag anthology.

In 2005, Hurricane Katrina forced the Cassins to relocate from their home in Uptown New Orleans to Baton Rouge. Despite failing health and artistic isolation, Cassin communicated with other poets, artists, and friends through the World Wide Web, usually through messages typed in all-capital letters. She continued to publish in major journals as late as 2006; Callaloo's post-Katrina issue featured "Three Love Poems by a Native," which Cassin also read during an October 26, 1995 interview with WWNO-FM's Fred Kasten.

Maxine Cassin died in Baton Rouge within days of Joe's death in March, 2010.

== Bibliography ==
=== Poetry collections ===
- Against The Clock: New and Neglected Poems. New Orleans: Portals Press, 2003.
- The Other Side of Sleep. New Orleans: Portals Press, 1995.
- Turnip's Blood. Baton Rouge: Sisters Grim Press, 1985.
- A Touch of Recognition. Denver: A. Swallow Press 1962.

=== Anthologies ===
- Umpteen Ways of Looking at a Possum: Critical and Creative Responses to Everette Maddox, eds. Julie Kane and Grace Bauer. (Contains "Happy Hour," "The Old Odor," and "The Medium," pp. 159–161, as well as multiple references to Cassin throughout.)
- Uncommonplace: An Anthology of Contemporary Louisiana Poets. LSU Press, 1988.
- The Louisiana Literature Prize for Poetry, 1987-1996: Artists and Poets in Dialogue. Southeastern Louisiana University, 1996.
- 9 x 3 (chapbook with Robert Lawrence Beum and Felix Stefanile). Redondo Beach, CA: Hearse Press, ca. 1962.

=== Editor ===
- New Orleans Poetry Journal, Jan. 1955-Dec. 1958.

New Orleans Poetry Journal Press

- "Wait for the Green Fire", Dale Matthews, 2010
- Rooms of Grace: New and Selected Poems, Paul Petrie, 2005.
- Illuminated Manuscript : Poems and Prints, Malaika Favorite, 1991.
- Hanoi Rose : A Poem Sequence, Ralph Adamo, 1989.
- The Well-Governed Son, Charles DeGravelles, 1987.
- Millenary, Raeburn Miller, 1986.
- Struggling to Swim on Concrete, Vassar Miller, 1984.
- Delusions of a Popular Mind, Martha McFerren, 1983.
- The Waking Passenger, Charles L. Black, 1983.
- The Everette Maddox Song Book, Everette Maddox, 1982.
- Maple Leaf Rag. New Orleans: Poetry Journal Press, 1980.

=== Articles, essays, etc. ===
- "An Appreciation of Ralph Adamo." Louisiana Literature: A Review of Literature and Humanities 2003 Fall-Winter; 20 (2): 111-14.
- "From Fred's Folder." Sagetrieb: A Journal Devoted to Poets in the Imagist/Objectivist Tradition 1997 Spring-Fall; 16 (1-2): 208-10.
- "Confessions of a Small Press Publisher." Louisiana Literature: A Review of Literature and Humanities 1996 Spring; 13 (1): 77-79.
- "Impartial Remarks." Yale Law Journal, Jul., 1986, vol. 95, no. 8, p. 1589

=== Poems in journals ===
- To a Minor Poet
- Beloit Poetry Journal, "Three Poems: To a Former Dinosaur, Dismemberment at the Beach, Chicken" 10:2 (Winter 1959-60), 14-15.
- Callaloo, "Three Love Poems by a Native." 29:4 (2006): 1033-1034.

=== Audio ===
- The Writer's Almanac. "My Captain." 3 February 2004 and 3 February 2008.
- Audio Archives, WWNO, 89.9 FM. "Maxine Cassin." 26 October 1995.
