= Jennifer K. Sweeney =

American poet (born 1973)

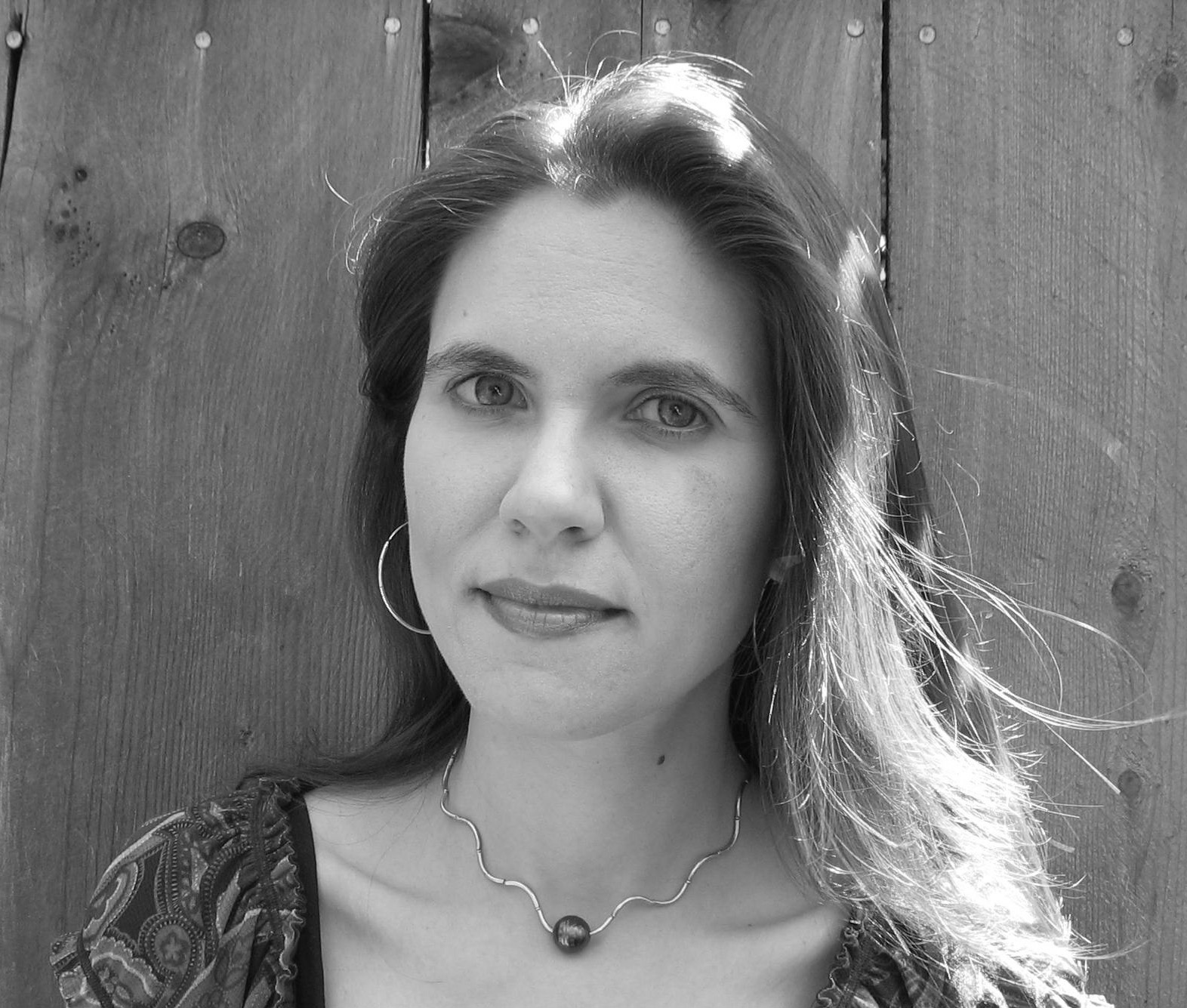
- Sweeney in 2006
- Born: 1973 (age 52–53); Connecticut, US
- Occupations: Poet, teacher
- Spouse: Chad Sweeney
- Writing career
- Notable works: How to Ride on Bread and Music, Salt Memory
- Notable awards: Main Street Rag Prize (2006); Elinor Benedict Prize (2009); James Laughlin Award (2009); Perugia Press Prize (2009)

Jennifer K. Sweeney is an American poet.

== Biography ==
Sweeney was born in 1973 and grew up in Tolland, Connecticut.

Sweeney holds an M.F.A. from Vermont College of Fine Arts and serves as assistant editor for DMQ Review. After teaching in San Francisco for twelve years, she relocated to Kalamazoo, Michigan, with her husband, poet Chad Sweeney. She now lives in California.

Sweeney is the author of four poetry collections, Foxlogic, Fireweed (Backwaters Press/University of Nebraska, 2020) winner of the Backwaters Prize, Little Spells (New Issues Poetry & Prose, 2015), How to Live on Bread and Music (Perugia Press, 2009), winner of the 2009 James Laughlin Award and the 2009 Perugia Press Prize. Her first collection, Salt Memory (Main Street Rag, 2006) won the 2006 Main Street Rag Poetry Award. Her poems have appeared in journals and magazines including Southern Review, Hunger Mountain, Crab Orchard, Spoon River and Passages North, where she won the 2009 Elinor Benedict Poetry Prize. Her honors include a Cultural Equities Grant from the San Francisco Arts Commission and a residency from Hedgebrook.

== Honors and awards ==
- 2006 Main Street Rag Poetry Award
- 2009 Perugia Press Prize
- 2009 James Laughlin Award
- 2019 Backwaters Prize in Poetry

== Works ==
=== Poems online ===
- A few poems at Poets.org/Academy of American Poets
- "Happy People". Hunger Mountain, 2009.
- "How to Grow a Mushroom". The Pedestal, Issue 51.
- "How to Live on Bread and Music," "Comfort". Del Sol Review, Summer 2008, 15.
- "33 Umbrellas". DMQ Review, May 2007.
- "How to Make Armor". Parthenon West Review, Issue 5.
- "What Call," "How to Make a Game of Waiting". Electronic Poetry Review, Issue 8.
- "The Bird Carver". The Pedestal, Issue 35.
- "Crooked Little Teeth," "The Game of Life". The Adroit Journal, Issue 17.

=== Published works ===
- —— (2006). Salt Memory. Main Street Rag Publications. Archived from the original on 2010-01-07.
- —— (2009). How to Live on Bread and Music. Perugia Press. Archived from the original on 2009-07-16.
- —— (2015). Little Spells. New Issues Poetry & Prose.
- —— (2020). Foxlogic, Fireweed. Backwaters Press/University of Nebraska.
