= Silvia Curbelo =

American poet

Silvia Curbelo is a Cuban-born, American poet and writer.

== Career ==
She is the author of four collections of poetry including Falling Landscape (Anhinga Press, 2015) Ambush (Main Street Rag, 2004), The Secret History of Water (Anhinga Press, 1997), and her first chapbook, the winner of the 1990 Gerald Cable Poetry Chapbook Competition, The Geography of Leaving (Silverfish Review Press, 1991).

Curbelo's poetry appears in over two dozen anthologies including The Body Electric: America's Best Poetry (W.W. Norton), Snakebird: Thirty Years of Anhinga Poets (Anhinga Press), Norton's Anthology of Latino Literature (W. W. Norton), and The Aunt Lute Anthology of U.S. Women Writers, Volume Two: The 20th Century (Aunt Lute Books).

Her poems have appeared in various journals, including American Poetry Review, Kenyon Review, Gettysburg Review, Prairie Schooner, Indiana Review, Crab Orchard Review and Tampa Review.

== Awards ==
She has received fellowships from the Florida Division of Cultural Affairs, the National Endowment for the Arts, the Seaside Institute, the Writer's Voice, the Florida Council on Arts and Culture and Cintas Foundation for her poetry. She won the Atlantic Center for the Arts Cultural Exchange Fellowship to La Napoule Arts Foundation in France. In 1996 Curbelo won the Jessica Nobel-Maxwell Memorial Prize from the American Poetry Review.

She was the judge for the 2010 Andrés Montoya Poetry Prize.

Curbelo currently lives and works in Tampa, Florida, and was the editor of the now-defunct Organica Quarterly for more than 20 years.

== See also ==
- Silvia Álvarez Curbelo, Puerto-Rican historian and writer
- Cuban American literature
- List of Cuban-American writers
