= Michael Mott =

British-born American author (1930–2019)

- Born: Michael Charles Alston Mott; 8 December 1930; London, England
- Died: 11 October 2019 (aged 88); Atlanta, Georgia, U.S.
- Occupations: Author, professor
- Notable work: The Seven Mountains of Thomas Merton (1984)

Michael Charles Alston Mott (8 December 1930 – 11 October 2019) was a British-born American author. He produced eleven poetry collections, four novels and a renowned biography of Thomas Merton.

== Life and career ==
Mott was born in London in December 1930. His father, Eric Mott, was a solicitor and his mother, Margaret "Totts" Berger Mott, was a sculptor from Denver, Colorado.

Mott was educated in the United States and in England. After his service in the British Army, he attended Oriel College, Oxford, then art school and a year traveling in Europe and the Middle East. Mott then began his literary career taking a job in 1956 as the editor of trade journal, Air Freight. Between 1956-1966, Mott also worked as the assistant editor of the literary magazine: ADAM International Review, alongside editor Miron Grindea. In 1957, his first collection of poetry, The Cost of Living, was published.

On 6 May 1961, Mott married Margaret Watt, a fashion designer, at St. John's Wood Church, London. In 1962, as the couple welcomed twin daughters, Sophie and Amanda, Mott's first novel The Notebooks of Susan Berry was published. Reviewer Kenneth Allsop writing for the Daily Mail called the book, "a brilliant first novel." Between 1961 and 1964, Mott worked as a book editor at Thames & Hudson and then as an editor at The Geographical Magazine (1964–66).

During this time, his first juvenile novel, Master Entrick was published in 1964 in the UK. The book was released in 1966 in the U.S. and a full twenty years later in 1986, a second edition was released as a Dell Yearling edition.

In 1966, Mott was invited to teach at Kenyon College and to be the poetry editor of The Kenyon Review. While at Kenyon, Mott continued to publish poetry and fiction, publishing Helmet and Wasps and The Blind Cross.

During the 1970s Mott and his family lived in Atlanta, Georgia. Mott taught at Emory University as Writer in Residence. Both Michael and Margaret, a costume designer with The Alliance Children's Theater and weaver, were active in Atlanta's budding arts scene. In 1972, he cofounded the Callanwolde Readings Program, which highlights poets and writers, with poet Turner Cassity. In 1974, Mott received the Governors Award in Fine Arts from then Governor Jimmy Carter.

In 1978, Michael Mott was commissioned to write the authorized biography of Thomas Merton. The Seven Mountains of Thomas Merton was published in 1984. The biography remained on the non-fiction The New York Times best-seller list for nine weeks. The book has had nine printings with 60,000 copies sold to date. Winner of a number of awards, the biography was the runner up for the Pulitzer Prize in biography in 1985.

Mott was awarded a Guggenheim Fellowship in 1979. In 1978-1979, and again in 1985-1986 Mott was Writer-in-Residence at the College of William and Mary. He held a Christopher Award and other awards, and had an honorary doctorate from St. Mary's College, Notre Dame. Mott's wife Margaret died of cancer in 1990. In 1992, Mott married Emma Lou Powers, he retired, Professor Emeritus, after eleven years' teaching at Bowling Green State University. In retirement he lived and wrote in Williamsburg, Virginia. He died in Atlanta, Georgia, where he was being cared for by his daughter Sophie.

== Published works ==
=== Nonfiction ===
- The Seven Mountains of Thomas Merton, Houghton Mifflin Harcourt, 1984, 1986; ISBN 0395404517, ISBN 9780395404515; Sheldon Press, 1986 (U.K.); ISBN 0859694828, ISBN 9780859694827.

=== Fiction ===
- The Notebooks of Susan Berry, Andre Deutsch (U.K.), 1962; MacMillan Company (U.S.), 1963; Mayflower-Dell Paperbacks (U.K.), 1964.
- Helmet and Wasps, Andre Deutsch (U.K.), 1965; Houghton Mifflin (U.S.), 1966; Granada Paperbacks (U.K.), 1970.
- Master Entrick, Andre Deutsch (U.K.), 1965; Penguin Puffin (U.K.), 1969; Delacorte (U.S.), 1966; Dell Yearling (U.S.), Second Edition, 1986.
- The Blind Cross, Andre Deutsch (U.K.), 1969; Delacorte (U.S.), 1969.

=== Poetry ===
- The Cost of Living, Adam Books, London, 1957.
- The Tales of Idiots & New Exile, Adam Books, London, 1961.
- A Book of Pictures, Outposts Publication, London, 1962.
- Absence of Unicorns, Presence of Lions, Little, Brown & Co., Boston, 1976.
- Counting the Grasses, Anhinga Press, Tallahassee, FL, 1980.
- Corday, Beacham Publishing, Washington, D.C., 1986. (Republished in paperback by Black Buzzard Press, Falls Church, VA, 1995.)
- Piero Di Cosimo: The World of Infinite Possibilities, Tinhorn Press, Atlanta, 1990.
- Taino (with drawings by Adrian Tri Diaz), Russell McKnight, Logan Elm Press, Columbus, OH 1992.
- Woman and the Sea, Selected Poems, Edited by Walton Beacham, and introduced by George Garrett, Anhinga Press, Tallahassee, FL., 1999.
- The World of Richard Dadd, Margie/Intuit House Press, Chesterfield, MO, 2005. ISBN 0971904014, Winner of the 2004 Robert E. Lee & Ruth I. Wilson Poetry Book Award. Introduction by Dara Wier.
- Pyder Hundred, the Natural History of Harlyn (Poems), ISBN 978-1906845469 Palores Publications, Redruth, Cornwall, 2013.
- His poetry has also appeared in numerous journals including American Scholar, Georgia Review, Kenyon Review, Sewanee Review, Stand Magazine, Tar River Poetry Review, Times Literary Supplement, Verse, Visions International (where he was featured poet in several editions), Image, The Spectator, etc.

== Debate ==
In The Martyrdom of Thomas Merton, (2018) Hugh Turley and David Martin refute the account of Merton's death in The Seven Mountains of Thomas Merton and other published biographies of Merton pointing to conspiracy theories of his death.

== Awards ==
- Governor's Award in the Fine Arts, 1974
- Guggenheim Fellowship, 1979-80
- Honorary DLitt, St. Mary's College, University of Notre Dame, 1983
- Christopher Award, 1984
- Ohioana Book Award, 1985
- Olscamp Research Award, Bowling Green State University, 1985
- Nancy Dasher Book Award, 1985
- Robert E. Lee & Ruth I. Wilson Poetry Book Award, 2004

== Resources ==
The Charles Deering McCormick Library of Special Collections, Northwestern University houses The Michael Mott Collection. This includes drafts and notes for Mott’s published and unpublished works, both poetry and prose; journals, diaries and notebooks from 1944–1988; and correspondence with his publishers and with fellow writers from 1965-1989.
