= Jenny Boully =

American writer

- Born: 1976 (age 49–50); Korat, Thailand
- Occupation: writer
- Known for: 2020 Guggenheim Fellow
- Notable work: not merely because of the unknown that was stalking toward them; The Body: An Essay; Moveable Types; The Book of Beginnings and Endings; One Love Affair

Jenny Boully (born 1976) is an author and recipient of a Guggenheim Fellowships award in 2020 for general nonfiction. She is the author of The Book of Beginnings and Endings (Sarabande Books, 2007), The Body: An Essay (Slope Editions, 2002 and Essay Press, 2007), and [one love affair]* (Tarpaulin Sky Press, 2006). Her work has appeared in literary magazines such as Boston Review, Conjunctions, Puerto del Sol, Seneca Review, and Tarpaulin Sky and has been anthologized in The Next American Essay, The Best American Poetry, and Great American Prose Poems: From Poe to the Present.

== Early life and education ==
Born in Korat, Thailand and reared in San Antonio, Texas, she has studied at Hollins University and the University of Notre Dame and has a PhD from the Graduate Center of the City University of New York. She previously divided her time between Texas and Brooklyn, then taught at Columbia College Chicago and is now a member of the literature and creative writing faculty at Bennington College.

== Career ==
Boully's first book, The Body, sold out of its first printing and was re-issued by Essay Press in 2007. A groundbreaking use of form, described by American poet and critic Arielle Greenberg as a "text on absence, love, ontology and identity—minus the text," the content of The Body is delivered only in footnotes, while the usual "body" of work is missing. Comparing it to Thalia Field's Point and Line, Greenberg praised The Body as "an invigorating new approach to the idea of a text, of fiction, of essay, of poetry collection," signaling a "courageous and thoughtful new voice in literature."

[one love affair]*, Boully's second book, was nominated for five awards and won two (Best Book of New Poetry Published in 2006, and Best Second Book) from Coldfront Magazine. "Through three sections rife with asterisks and superscript roman numerals," using a mixture of fiction, essay, prose poetry, and memoir, [one love affair]* "challenges the ways in which we construct narratives and read texts," as it "wends a story of broken relationships, deploying everything from mimosa trees and spring to nightclubs and crack-smoke," and explores " the way we learn to love and love again."

Boully's third collection, The Book of Beginnings and Endings, "consists of beginnings and endings of more than 30 different texts, spliced together seemingly at random. The subject matter ranges wildly: invertebrate zoology, probability, the psychology of a scream, the retirement of an ice cream man, a plague of frogs. Slowly, the reader notices thematic connections and the shadow of a narrative arc." As with Boully's previous collections, The Book of Beginnings and Endings accrues meaning and import through "use of association, rather than spelled-out narrative." It "resembles poetry. The texts themselves are essayistic, except that they are all fictional." A reviewer for the Los Angeles Times focused on another shared element in all of Boully's books--love, the affair of love, its beginning and it ending: "Like Anaïs Nin, Boully believes exclusively in love; it's her religion." On the relationship between this author and her readers, the reviewer added: It's uncommonly good to read the work of a writer who believes so unabashedly in the miracle of writing—that some dimension, unlike any other, exists between the writer and the reader; that literature is an 'open system,' a 'living system.'"

== Works ==
- not merely because of the unknown that was stalking toward them, Tarpaulin Sky Press; 1st paperback edition (June 15, 2011)
- The Body: An Essay, Essay Press (March 1, 2007)
- Moveable Types, Noemi Press; 1st edition (January 1, 2007)
- The Book of Beginnings and Endings, Sarabande Books (November 1, 2007)
- One Love Affair, Tarpaulin Sky Press; 1st paperback edition (April 24, 2006)
