= Beloit Poetry Journal =

American poetry magazine

- Categories: Poetry
- Frequency: Three per year
- First issue: Fall 1950; 76 years ago
- Country: United States
- Based in: Windham, Maine
- Language: English
- Website: www.bpj.org
- ISSN: 0005-8661 (print); 2328-0867 (web)
- OCLC: 60626506

The Beloit Poetry Journal is an American poetry magazine established in 1950 at Beloit College. It was formerly issued four times a year. Its frequency was switched to three times per year. It is based in Windham, Maine.

The stated mission of the magazine is "to seek out and share work of fresh and lasting power, poems that speak startling, complicated, necessary truths and that do so in surprising and beautiful ways," and work "that pushes boundaries of content, aesthetic, and form." As a consequence of these policies they are known for sometimes publishing very long poems.

Included among the poets whose work has been featured in Beloit are Sherman Alexie, Bruce Bond, Charles Bukowski, Maxine Cassin, Eduardo C. Corral, Patricia Goedicke, Albert Goldbarth, Ramon Guthrie, Janice N. Harrington, Lola Haskins, Janet Holmes, Fady Joudah, Douglas Kearney, Galway Kinnell, Maxine Kumin, Mary Leader, Khaled Mattawa, and Sharon Olds.

== Awards ==
Starting in 1993 and continuing up to 2017 the Beloit Poetry Journal annually awarded The Chad Walsh Poetry Prize. Recipients have been:

- 1993 Kurt Leland
- 1994 Albert Goldbarth
- 1995 Sherman Alexie
- 1996 Robert Chute
- 1997 Mary Leader
- 1998 Lucia Perillo
- 1999 Janet Holmes
- 2000 Margaret Aho
- 2001 Glori Simmons
- 2002 Patricia Goedicke
- 2003 Mary Molinary
- 2004 Jessica Goodfellow
- 2005 Karl Elder
- 2006 Sam Reed
- 2007 Susan Tichy
- 2008 John Hodgen
- 2009 Onna Solomon
- 2010 Charles Wyatt
- 2011 Jenny Johnson
- 2012 Elizabeth T. Gray
- 2013 Ocean Vuong
- 2014 Fiona Chamness
- 2015 Graham Barnhart
- 2016 Marjorie Stelmach
- 2017 Michael Lavers

In 2019 the Beloit Poetry Journal established the Adrienne Rich Award for Poetry which would award a fifteen hundred dollar prize for a single poem.
