= Patricia Goedicke =

American poet

Patricia Goedicke (June 21, 1931 – July 14, 2006) was an American poet.

== Biography ==
Born Patricia McKenna in Boston, Massachusetts, she grew up in Hanover, New Hampshire, where her father was a resident psychiatrist at Dartmouth College. During her high school years she was an accomplished downhill skier. She earned her B.A. at Middlebury College in 1953, where she studied with Robert Frost. She also studied under W. H. Auden at Young Men's Hebrew Association of New York City in 1955.

She married in 1956 Victor Goedicke, a professor at Ohio University, where in 1965 she completed her M.A. in creative writing and poetry. She divorced in 1968, the same year that while an artist in residence at the MacDowell Colony in Peterborough, New Hampshire, she met Leonard Wallace Robinson. He was a writer for The New Yorker and a fiction editor and book editor at Esquire Magazine. They married in 1971. The couple later moved to San Miguel de Allende in the Mexican state of Guanajuato, where she taught creative writing at the Universidad de Guanajuato. Goedicke and Robinson returned to the United States in 1981, and she became professor at the University of Montana, where she taught until her retirement in 2003.

Goedicke died of pneumonia and a complication of lung cancer, at St. Patrick Hospital and Health Sciences Center in Missoula, Montana.

== Awards and honors ==
Her awards and honors include the Rockefeller Foundation Residency at its Villa Serbelloni; a National Endowment for the Arts Creative Writing Fellowship; a Pushcart Prize; the William Carlos Williams Prize; the 1987 Carolyn Kizer Prize; the Hohenberg Award, and the 1992 Edward Stanley Award from Prairie Schooner. Her last book was recognized as one of the top 10 poetry books of 2000 by the American Library Association. The Tongues We Speak was a New York Times Notable Book of the Year in 1990. She was awarded The Chad Walsh Poetry Prize by the Beloit Poetry Journal in 2002.

== Published works ==
=== Books ===
- As the Earth Begins to End: New Poems, poetry (Port Townsend: Copper Canyon Press, 2000)
- Invisible Horses, poetry (Minneapolis: Milkweed Editions, 1996)
- Paul Bunyon's Bearskin, poetry (Minneapolis: Milkweed Editions, 1992)
- The Tongues We Speak: New and Selected Poems, poetry (Minneapolis: Milkweed Editions, 1989)
- Listen, Love, poetry (Daleville: Barnwood, 1986)
- The Wind of Our Going, poetry (Port Townsend: Copper Canyon Press, 1985)
- Crossing the Same River, poetry (Amherst: University of Massachusetts Press, 1980)
- The Dog That Was Barking Yesterday, poetry (Amherst: Lynx, 1980)
- The Trail That Turns on Itself, poetry (Ithaca: Ithaca House Press, 1978)
- For the Four Corners, poetry (Ithaca: Ithaca House Press, 1976)
- Between Oceans, poetry (San Diego: Harcourt, 1968)

=== Individual works ===
- What Rushes By Us

== Sources ==
- Contemporary Authors Online. The Gale Group, 2001. PEN (Permanent Entry Number): 0000037403
