= WritersCorps =

American organization

WritersCorps is an American artists-in-service organization that hires professional writers to teach creative writing to youth. It grew from a national service model in the WPA tradition and is now an alliance of separately-run organizations in three cities.

== History ==
WritersCorps was born out of discussions between the National Endowment for the Arts and AmeriCorps with the goal of furthering a group of artists to teach creative writing at public schools and social service organizations in order to help underserved youth improve their literacy and communication skills and to offer creative expression as an alternative to violence, alcohol and drug abuse. They selected San Francisco, Washington, D.C. and Bronx, N.Y. as the three initial sites.

In 1997, WritersCorps transitioned from being a federally funded program to an independent alliance that is supported by a collaboration of public and private partners. DC WritersCorps is a nonprofit organization while San Francisco and the Bronx WritersCorps are projects of the San Francisco Arts Commission and the Bronx Council on the Arts, respectively.

The organizations lead writing workshops, produce youth events, and create books of youth work, including two national anthologies published by HarperCollins: Paint Me Like I Am and Tell the World.

== San Francisco WritersCorps ==
Since its inception in 1994, San Francisco WritersCorps has helped over 20,000 young people from neighborhoods throughout San Francisco improve their literacy and increase their desire to learn. WritersCorps is a joint project of the San Francisco Arts Commission and San Francisco Public Library.

=== Mission ===
WritersCorps hires experienced teachers who are published poets, fiction writers, playwrights and performers. These writers-in-service work long-term and in-depth in communities to build lasting relationships and to provide positive role models for young people. In addition to teaching creative writing, the WritersCorps teaching artists work together as a team to produce special projects and support each other as resources in the field of community arts.

WritersCorps classes exercise the imagination and allow young people to expand their possibilities, improve their critical thinking and become more self-aware. The organization publishes anthologies of youth writing, produces writing contests and puts on performances at community venues.

The organization serves over 1,000 young people a year, ages 6–22, who are low-income, incarcerated, immigrant, homeless and educationally disadvantaged. WritersCorps conducts workshops in public schools, community centers, detention facilities, after-school programs and in low-income housing.

As of the 2010–2011 school year, San Francisco has six teaching artists who offer creative writing workshops to 600 students at ten sites, including public schools, libraries, and the juvenile justice system.

=== Awards and Distinctions ===
==== National Arts and Humanities Youth Program Award ====
In October 2010, San Francisco WritersCorps was recognized with a prestigious national award by First Lady Michelle Obama at a White House ceremony.

Chosen from a pool of more than 400 nominations and 50 finalists, WritersCorps was one of 15 after-school and out-of-school programs across the country to receive the 2010 National Arts and Humanities Youth Program Award (formerly, the Coming Up Taller Award), the highest honor such programs can receive in the United States. The awards are administered annually by the President's Committee on the Arts and the Humanities.

The award honors WritersCorps for its effectiveness in developing creativity and fostering academic success by engaging young people in the arts and humanities.

== Books and Teaching Artists ==
In 2009, City Lights published "Days I Moved Through Ordinary Sounds: the Teachers of WritersCorps in Poetry and Prose," an anthology of poetry, fiction, memoir and playwriting by fifty teaching artists in the National WritersCorps, each of whom led writing workshops in San Francisco, Washington D.C., or the Bronx with youth in public schools, housing projects and detention facilities.

In 2010, San Francisco WritersCorps independently published its first travel and poetry anthology, "City of Stairways: A Poet's Field Guide to San Francisco," written by students in the Apprentice Program, an after-school program for advanced young writers. Part travel guide and part literary anthology, the book is 7x7 inches, to reflect the dimensions of San Francisco (7x7 miles). "City of Stairways" includes original poetry, photography, artwork, maps, and tips on neighborhoods and sites in San Francisco. The book was lauded by former mayor Gavin Newsom as "an engaging approach to seven San Francisco neighborhoods seen through the eyes of the newest generation of San Francisco poets."

Writers who have taught in WritersCorps include Stephen Beachy, Ishle Park, Jeffrey McDaniel, giovanni singleton, and Chad Sweeney.
