= Janet Holmes (poet) =

American poet and professor

Janet Holmes is an American poet and professor.

== Education and career ==
Holmes earned her B.A. from Duke University and her M.F.A. from Warren Wilson College.

She was the director of Ahsahta Press.

She taught at Boise State University in the Department of Theatre, Film and Creative Writing from 1999 through 2019.

== Published works ==
She is the author of six poetry collections, most recently The ms of m y kin (Shearsman Books, 2009). Her poems were published in literary journals including American Poetry Review, Beloit Poetry Journal, Boulevard, Carolina Quarterly, Georgia Review, Michigan Quarterly Review, MiPoesias, Nimrod, Pleiades, Poetry, Prairie Schooner, and in anthologies including The Best American Poetry 1994 and The Best American Poetry 1995.

Full-length collections

- The ms of m y kin (Shearsman Books, 2009)
- F2F (University of Notre Dame Press, 2006)
- Humanophone (University of Notre Dame Press, 2001)
- The Green Tuxedo (University of Notre Dame Press, 1998)
- The Physicist at the Mall (Anhinga Press, 1994)

Chapbooks

- Paperback Romance (State Street Press, 1984)

== Honors and awards ==
Her honors include the Minnesota Book Award and fellowships from Yaddo and the MacDowell Colony.

- 1999 Chad Walsh Poetry Prize from Beloit Poetry Journal
- 1999 Minnesota Book Award
- 1998 Poetry Book of the Year from ForeWord Magazine
- 1997 Pablo Neruda Award from Nimrod International Journal of Prose & Poetry
- 1996 Ernest Sandeen Prize in Poetry
- 1993 Anhinga Prize
- 1984 State Street Press Chapbook Award

== Sources ==
- Boise State University > English Department Faculty Profile > Janet Holmes
- Library of Congress Online Catalog > Janet Holmes
