= Chad Sweeney =

American writer (born 1970)

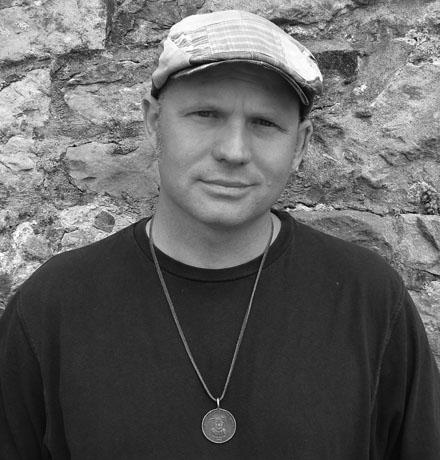
- Sweeney in 2009
- Born: 1970 (age 55–56); Oklahoma
- Occupations: Poet, editor, teacher, translator
- Spouse: Jennifer K. Sweeney
- Writing career
- Notable works: An Architecture, Arranging the Blaze, Days I Moved Through Ordinary Sounds, Parthenon West Review

Chad Sweeney (born 1970) is an American poet, translator and editor.

== Life ==
Born in Oklahoma in 1970, Sweeney holds a BA from the University of Oklahoma, an MFA from San Francisco State University, and a PhD from Western Michigan University.

Sweeney is the author of five books of poetry, Little Million Doors: An Elegy (Nightboat Books, 2019) (Winner of the Nightboat Poetry Prize), Wolf's Milk: The Lost Notebooks of Juan Sweeney (Forklift Books), Parable of Hide and Seek (Alice James Books 2010), Arranging the Blaze (Anhinga, 2009), and An Architecture (BlazeVox, 2007); and five chapbooks, including A Mirror to Shatter the Hammer (Tarpaulin Sky Press, 2006). With David Holler, he edits Parthenon West Review, a journal of contemporary poetry, translation and essays and Ghost Town Literary Magazine, a fiction and poetry journal.

Sweeney's poems have appeared in Best American Poetry 2008, the Pushcart Prize Anthology 2012 and Verse Daily, and in other journals and magazines including New American Writing, Black Warrior Review, Verse, Volt, Slope, Barrow Street, Colorado Review, and Denver Quarterly. With Mojdeh Marashi, he has translated selected poems by the Iranian poet, H.E. Sayeh (Hushang Ebtehaj), with individual poems appearing in such magazines as Crazyhorse, American Letters & Commentary, Indiana Review, Poetry International, Subtropics, Pingpong and Seattle Review. He has been awarded both a Project Grant and a Cultural Equities Grant

from the San Francisco Arts Commission for his work as editor and translator.

Sweeney taught for seven years in the San Francisco WritersCorps, where he compiled and edited Days I Moved Through Ordinary Sounds: the Teachers of WritersCorps in Poetry and Prose (City Lights, 2009), an anthology of poetry, fiction, memoir and playwriting. He moved to Kalamazoo, Michigan to earn a Ph.D. in English with a creative dissertation. He moved to California later that year to become an assistant professor of English/Creative Writing in the MFA program at California State University San Bernardino and lives in Southern California with his wife, poet Jennifer K. Sweeney and their son, Liam.

== Published works ==
Full-Length Poetry Collections

- Little Million Doors: An Elegy (Nightboat Books, 2019) (Winner of the Nightboat Poetry Prize)
- Wolf's Milk: Lost Notebooks of Juan Sweeney (Forklift Books)
- The Art of Stepping Through Time: Selected Poems of H.E. Sayeh (Translated by Chad Sweeney and Mojdeh Marashi, White Pine Press)
- Parable of Hide and Seek, (Alice James Books)
- Arranging the Blaze, (Anhinga Press, 2009)
- An Architecture, (BlazeVOX Books, 2007)

Chapbooks

- A Mirror to Shatter the Hammer, (Tarpaulin Sky Press, 2006)
- Nail by Nail the Sunlight, (Brooklyn, NY: Urban Iris Press, 2003)
- Mushrooms, (San Francisco, CA: 3300 Press, 1995)
- Relearning the Tongue, (Edmond, OK: Broncho Press, 1993)

Works Edited

- Days I Moved Through Ordinary Sounds (City Lights, San Francisco, CA: 2009) ISBN 978-1-931404-10-5.
- Parthenon West Review (Issues 1 - 8, Berkeley, CA)

Poems Online

- Subtropics > Sunset on the Green co-translation of H.E. Sayeh by Chad Sweeney and Mojdeh Marashi > Issue 6, 2008
- "Parable of Day," "Notes Toward Making," "Character Development". Electronic Poetry Review 8, 2008.
- "A Love Song," "Poem," "Landscape," "The Auction". Slope 23, 2006.
- "New Mexico". Tarpaulin Sky, 2006.
- "Thanksgiving," "Where," "Journey to Detroit," "Of What Continues". Eratio, Issue 8, 2006.
