= Jane Cooper =

American poet

- Born: October 9, 1924; Atlantic City, New Jersey
- Died: October 26, 2007 (aged 83); Newtown, Bucks County, Pennsylvania
- Occupation: Poet

Jane Cooper (October 9, 1924 – October 26, 2007) was an American poet.

== Awards ==
- Award in Literature from the American Academy of Arts and Letters
- Maurice English Poetry Award (1985)
- Shelley Memorial Award (1977)
- Bunting Institute of Radcliffe College - Fellowship
- Guggenheim Fellowship - (1960)
- Ingram Merrill Award
- National Endowment for the Arts - Fellowship
- Lamont Poetry Prize (1968) for The Weather of Six Mornings

== Works ==
- The Blue Anchor; The Earthquake; Ordinary Detail; In the Last Few Moments Came the Old German Cleaning Woman; Rent; The Winter Road (Part 4); The Flashboat, Norton Poets online

=== Books ===
- The Weather of Six Mornings (1969), which was the Lamont Poetry Selection of The Academy of American Poets.
- Maps and Windows (1974)
- Scaffolding: Selected Poems (1993)
- Green Notebook, Winter Road (1994), which was a finalist for the Lenore Marshall Poetry Prize
- Flashboat: Poems Collected and Reclaimed (W. W. Norton & Company, 1999)

=== Edited ===
- Extended Outlooks: The Iowa Review Collection of Contemporary Women Writers (1982)
- The Sanity of Earth and Grass: Complete Poems of Robert Winner (1994)

== Memories ==
- Memories of Jane Cooper, Denise Duhamel, American Poetry Review, May 12, 2008
- Memories of Jane Cooper part 2, Denise Duhamel, American Poetry Review, May 14, 2008
