= Charles Wyatt (writer) =

American musician and writer

Charles Wyatt is an American musician and writer.

== Personal life ==
Charles Wyatt graduated from the Curtis Institute of Music in Philadelphia. After performing as a flutist for several years, he went back to school to receive an MFA from Warren Wilson College. He currently lives in Nashville with his wife, standard poodle Lucy, and coon cat Sylvester.

== Professional life ==
Before receiving his MFA, Wyatt worked successfully as a flutist. He played with various orchestras, including the US Marine Band and held the position of principal flutist with the Nashville Symphony Orchestra for twenty-five years. Since receiving his MFA, he has left the orchestra to teach writing at, among others, Oberlin College, Purdue University, and Denison University. His book Listening to Mozart received the John Simmons Short Fiction Award.

== Bibliography ==
Listening to Mozart (University of Iowa Press, 1995)
Falling Stones: The Spirit Autobiography of S.M. Jones (Texas Review Press, 2002)
Swan of Tuonela (Hanging Loose Press, 2006)
