= William Wadsworth (poet) =

American poet (born 1950)

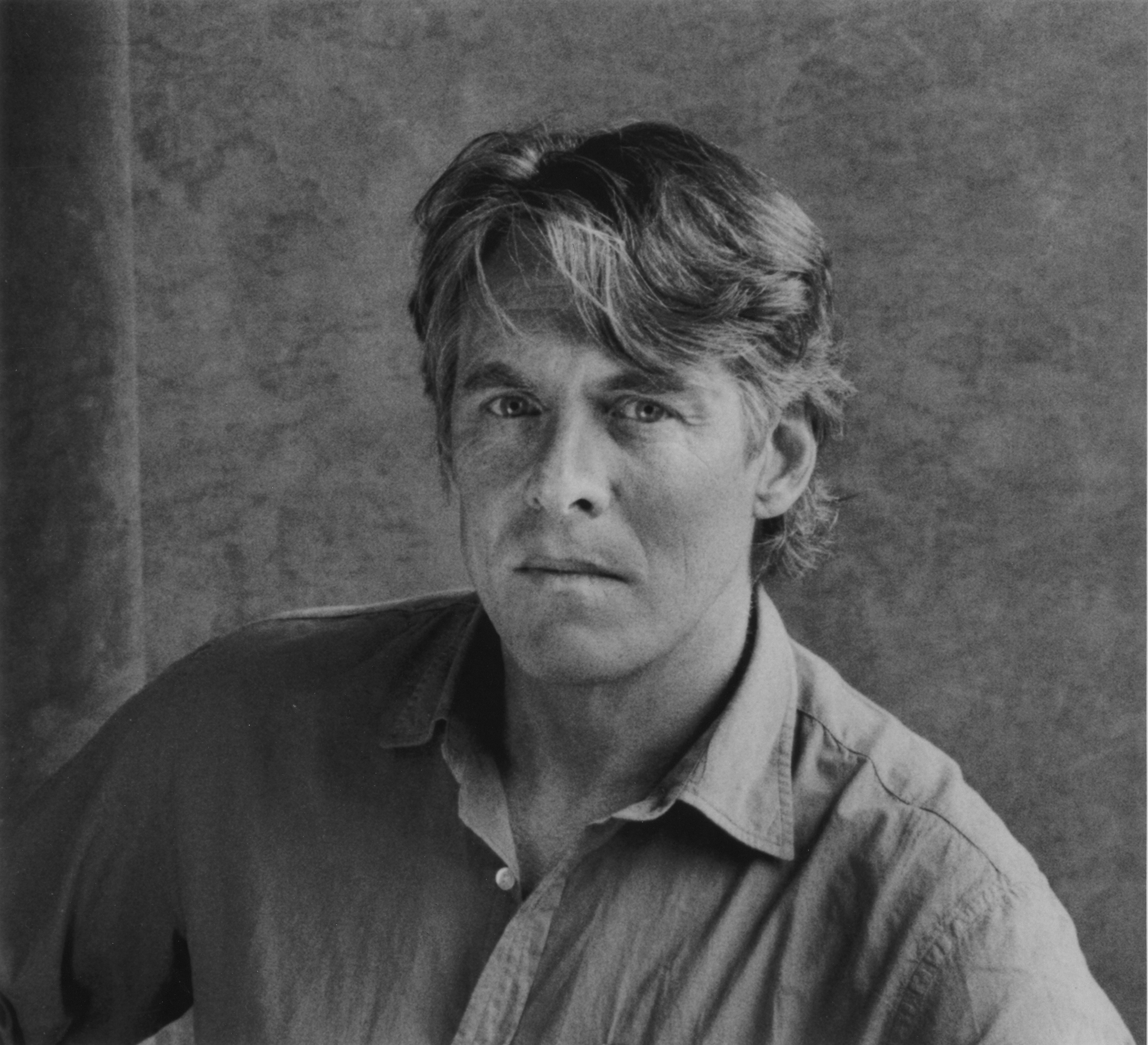
- Born: 1950 (age 75–76); Long Island, New York, U.S.
- Other name: Bill Wadsworth
- Occupation: Poet

William Wadsworth, also known as Bill Wadsworth, is an American poet born on Long Island, New York, in 1950.

Wadsworth's work has appeared in The New Republic, The Paris Review, The Yale Review, Tin House, Salmagundi, and the Boston Review, among other magazines, as well as in several anthologies, including The Best American Erotic Poems, edited by David Lehman, and the Library of America Anthology of American Religious Poems, edited by Harold Bloom. Wadsworth's collection of poems The Physicist on a Cold Night Explains was published by Vaso Roto Press in 2010.

From 1989 to 2001, Wadsworth served as executive director of the Academy of American Poets, where he oversaw the launch of the website poets.org and the inauguration of April as National Poetry Month, among other national arts initiatives. From 2006 to 2021, he taught in the Columbia University MFA Writing Program, where he also served as Director of Academic Administration from 2008 to 2020.
