= Patricia Traxler =

American poet

- Occupation: Writer
- Writing career
- Genres: Poetry, Fiction, Essays
- Website: www.patriciatraxler.com//

Patricia Traxler, winner of the 2019 Kansas Book Award in Poetry, is an American poet, essayist, and fiction writer who lives in Salina, Kansas. She is the author of four volumes of poetry, a novel, and a short story collection. Born and raised in San Diego, California, one of eight children in a working-class family, Traxler was much influenced by her maternal grandmother, Nora Dunne, a poet from County Cork, Ireland, who lived with the family for several years during Traxler’s childhood.

== Biography ==
Traxler moved to Salina from San Diego in 1980, and later that year was named poet-in-residence of Salina by the Salina Arts and Humanities Commission, a post she held for five years. In 1983, as a component of her residency, she founded Salina's Spring Poetry Reading Series, which is still bringing poets of national repute into Salina each April.

She was named Bunting Poetry Fellow at Radcliffe College in 1990 i. and was awarded a second fellowship year at Radcliffe in 1991, where she finished her third poetry collection, Forbidden Words. In 1996, she was named Hugo Poet at the University of Montana and in 1997 she was made Thurber Poet at the Ohio State University.

Traxler has read, lectured, or served as a visiting poet at many universities including Radcliffe College, Old Dominion University, the University of San Diego, the Ohio State University, Utah State University, San Diego State University, the University of Montana Missoula, University of Kansas Lawrence, and Kansas Wesleyan University. Though she enjoys teaching aspiring young poets and fiction writers in a university setting, Traxler is especially drawn to the inspiration and challenge of working as a writer in the community with people of all ages and backgrounds.

Traxler has worked with mainstream and gifted student populations at all academic levels and has developed writing programs and projects for at-risk student teens, deaf and hearing-impaired students, and students with learning disabilities. She has also created grief workshops for adults and children, programs for cancer patients, survivors of domestic violence, residents of homeless shelters, and for mental-health patients and stroke patients in a hospital setting. She taught creative writing at Kansas Wesleyan University, Salina, KS, for 17 years.

== Work ==
Traxler's poetry has appeared in the Boston Review, Ploughshares, The Nation, The Kenyon Review, Slate, Ms. Magazine, the Los Angeles Times, Tikkun, Agni, New Letters and in the anthology Best American Poetry.

Traxler's first volume of poetry, Blood Calendar (1975), added "humor and a sense of fantasy to the genre of feminist poetry," according to Library Journal.

In 1988, she published a local history anthology of people from the Salina area. To create the book, Traxler advertised that she would "be happy to help anyone trying to get his or her memories onto paper."

Traxler's 1994 poetry collection, Forbidden Words, examines the process of writing and giving voices to the voiceless. Publishers Weekly wrote that "These poems strike a thrilling balance between personal disclosure and the rigors of writing."

Her first novel, Blood (2001), is a literary thriller with its focus on a Boston artist's life and work, and the complications that arise when her solitary focus is broken by the murder of a friend and colleague and followed by a series of brutal killings that edge ever closer to her own life. The story's descriptions were considered "especially vivid" by Library Journal and showed her poetic roots.

== Selected bibliography ==
- Traxler, Patricia (2020). In the Skin. Spartan Press. ISBN 978-1950380985.
- Traxler, Patricia (2016). Naming the Fires. Hanging Loose Press. ISBN 9781934909850.
- Traxler, Patricia (2007). "Still Listening for My Father's Words". Newsweek.
- Traxler, Patricia (2001). Blood. St. Martin's. ISBN 0312304013.
- Traxler, Patricia (1998). The Unremembered Dream. Night Errands: How Poets Use Dreams (Roderick Townley, ed., University of Pittsburgh Press, 1998 – via digital.library.pitt.edu.
- "The Day My Grandmother's Eyes Turned to Glass," - Grandmothers: Granddaughters Remember (Marguerite Bouvard, ed., Syracuse University Press, 1998).
- Traxler, Patricia (1994-01-01). Forbidden Words: Poems. University of Missouri Press. ISBN 9780826209351. "Forbidden Words."
- "Elena, Come Here, My Little Gerbil" - The Best of Bad Hemingway: Award Anthology (Harcourt Brace Jovanovich/Mariner Books, 1989, 1990)
- Traxler, Patricia (1988). In Our Time. Smoky Hill River Press. ISBN 0932199003.
- Traxler, Patricia (1984). Vintage. Smoky Hill River Press. ISBN 0932199003.
- Traxler, Patricia (1983-01-01). The Glass Woman. Hanging Loose Press. ISBN 9780914610342.
- Traxler, Patricia (1975-01-01). Blood Calendar. Morrow. ISBN 9780688029708.

== Poetry anthology publications ==
- A Handbook of Heartbreak, "How I Got This Way," (Robert Pinsky, ed., William Morrow & Co., Inc., 1998)
- Anthology of Magazine Verse (Alan F. Pater, ed., Monitor Book Company, 1981)
- Best American Poetry, "Death of a Distant In-law," (A.R. Ammons, Ed., Scribners, 1994)
- Confluence, "The Widow," "Why She Waits," "The Roomer," "Death & the Redhaired Man" (Denise Low, ed., Cottonwood Press, 1983)
- e: the Emily Dickinson Award Anthology, "Blackberries," (Universities West Press, 2001)
- Hang Together, "At the New World Donut Shop," "Cicadas in August," "Heart at the Window," "How I Got This Way" (Robert Hershon, Dick Lourie, Ron Schreiber, eds., Hanging Loose Press, 1987)
- Kansas Women Writers, "Number 7 Love," "The Roomer," and "The Language of Crows," (Mel Farley, Ed., Cottonwood Press, 1981)
- So You Want to be a Writer, "Poem for My Son," ( Robert E. Moore, ed., Boyd & Fraser, 1974)
- Tangled Vines, "The Contest of Nerves," (Lyn Lifshin, ed., Beacon Press, 1978; Mariner Books, 1992)
- The Ring of Words, "War: a Memoir," (Andrew Motion, Ed., Telegraph Books & Sutton Publishing, 1998, UK)

== Awards ==
- Moth Magazine Short Story Award, Ireland, 2019
- 2019 Kansas Book Award in Poetry for Naming the Fires
- Alice Carter Award for Poetry, University of Kansas, 1994
- Georgia State University Award for Short Fiction, 1998
- Grand Prize winner of the International Imitation Hemingway Competition, 1978
- Hackney Literary Award for Short Fiction, 1997
- Kansas Literary Fellowship, 1994
- Nimrod’s Pablo Neruda Award, 1998
- Ploughshares' Cohen Award, 1991
- Poetry Society of America Writers Magazine/Emily Dickinson Award honors, 1994 & 1999
- Radcliffe’s Presidential Discretionary Award, 1991
- The Writer's Voice of New York City Open Voice Award for Short Fiction, 1993

== Sources ==
- Poets & Writers, Directory of Writers, 2017 - Patricia Traxler
- KansasPoets.com - Patricia Traxler
- Washburn University - PTraxler reference - bibliography
- Washburn University - PTraxler reference - primary documents
