= Caroline Knox =

American poet (1938–2025)

Caroline Knox (April 27, 1938 – April 24, 2025) was an American poet based in Massachusetts. She is the author of six collections of poetry, most recently, Quaker Guns (Wave Books, 2008), and Nine Worthies (Wave Books, 2010). Her poems have been published in literary journals and magazines including American Scholar, Boston Review, Harvard, Massachusetts Review, New Republic, Paris Review, Ploughshares, Poetry, TriQuarterly, The Times Literary Supplement, and Yale Review. Her poems have also been included in Best American Poetry (1988 and 1994). Her honors include fellowships from the National Endowment for the Arts, the Ingram Merrill Foundation, the Massachusetts Cultural Council, The Fund for Poetry, and the Yale/Mellon Visiting Faculty Program. Knox earned her A.B. from Radcliffe College and her M.A. and Ph.D. from University of Wisconsin–Milwaukee.

Knox died on April 24, 2025, at the age of 88.

== Bibliography ==
- Hear Trains (Wave Books, 2019)
- To Drink Boiled Snow (Wave Books, 2015)
- Flemish (Wave Books, 2013)
- Nine Worthies (Wave Books, 2010)
- Quaker Guns (Wave Books, 2008)
- He Paves the Road with Iron Bars (Verse Press, 2004)
- A Beaker: New and Selected Poems (Verse Press, 2002)
- Sleepers Wake (Timken Publishers, 1994)
- To Newfoundland (University of Georgia Press, 1989)
- The House Party (University of Georgia Press, 1984)

== Honors and awards ==
- 2006 Massachusetts Cultural Council
- 2005 Maurice English Poetry Award (for He Paves the Road with Iron Bars)
- 1996 Massachusetts Cultural Council
- 1986 National Endowment for the Arts Fellowship
