= Stephen Paul Miller =

American poet

Stephen Paul Miller (born 1951) is an American poet and academic. He has written five books of poetry, one critical volume, and co-edited two critical collections.

Miller's poetry books include Being with a Bullet (Talisman), Skinny Eighth Avenue (Marsh Hawk Press), Art Is Boring for the Same Reason We Stayed in Vietnam (Domestic), The Bee Flies in May (Marsh Hawk Press), and the forthcoming Fort Dad (Marsh Hawk Press). He is also the author of The Seventies Now: Culture as Surveillance (Duke University Press) and Screwball Consensus: Franklin Roosevelt, Alan Turing, and Preston Sturges. With Terence Diggory, Miller co-edited Scene of Our Selves: New Works on the New York School Poets (National Poetry Foundation, University of Maine, Orono) and, with Daniel Morris, Secular Jewish Culture/Radical Poetic Practice (University of Alabama Press). Miller teaches English at St. John's University.
