= Maureen Owen =

American poet, editor, and biographer (born 1943)

- Born: July 6, 1943 (age 83); Graceville, Minnesota, U.S.
- Education: San Francisco State University; Seattle University
- Occupations: Poet; Editor; Biographer
- Writing career
- Genre: Poetry

Maureen Owen (born July 6, 1943) is an American poet, editor, and biographer.

== Life ==
Born in Graceville, Minnesota, Owen was raised on her family’s farm and later on California’s horseracing tracks where her parents were horse trainers. She traveled in the Racing Fair Circuit along with her family in the summers. They wintered at Santa Anita Racetrack. Owen attended Seattle University and San Francisco State University. In 1965, she moved to Japan, and then to New York in 1968. Owen was co-director of the St. Mark's Poetry Project (1976–1980) in New York City. She has worked as Program Coordinator at the Poetry Project in NY and served on the Board of the Poetry Project and the Coordinating Council of Literary Magazines—both as a member and as a vice-chairperson.

Owen is the editor and publisher of Telephone Books. She began publishing and editing Telephone Books and Telephone magazine, a press and magazine that began in mimeograph format, and has edited over thirty titles of the press and nineteen issues of the magazine. She has taught a number of creative writing workshops including children and seniors. Her academic career includes teaching courses in creative writing and research at the Edinboro University of Pennsylvania in 1999, as well as mentoring workshops at Swarthmore College and St. Joseph's College in Connecticut. She currently teaches at Naropa University, both on campus and in the low-residency MFA Creative Writing Program, and is editor-in-chief of Naropa’s on-line zine not enough night. Her title Edges of Water is forthcoming from Chax Press. She can be found reading her work on the PennSound website. Paul Hoover has said of her work, "Astonishing things quietly occur."

Andrei Codrescu notes, "Her exuberant style and tremendous energy shine in her strongly feminist works." and reviewer Barbara Einzig has said, "there's still dirt under her nails."

Her papers are held at University of California, San Diego.

== Awards ==
- 2011 Fund for Poetry Award
- 2010 Colorado Book Award and Balcones Poetry Prize finalist, for Erosion's Pull
- 1999 Los Angeles Times Book Festival Prize finalist
- 1998 Foundation for Contemporary Performance Arts
- 1985 American Book Award, for AE
- 1979-1980 National Endowment for the Arts fellowship grant

== Works ==
=== Poetry ===
- Country Rush Adventures in Poetry (1973)
- No Travels Journal Cherry Valley, NY: Cherry Valley Editions (1975)
- "A Brass Choir Approaches the Burial Ground" in BIG DEAL 5 (1977)
- Hearts in Space New York: Kulchur Press, (1980)
- Zombie notes: poems. SUN. 1985. ISBN 978-0-915342-48-8.
- Imaginary Income (1992)
- Untapped Maps (1993)
- American rush: selected poems. Talisman House. 1998. ISBN 978-1-883689-69-8.
- Erosion's Pull. Coffee House Press. 2006. ISBN 978-1-56689-184-4.
- Edges of Water Chax Press (2013)

=== Anthologies ===
- A. R. Ammons; David Lehman, eds. (1994). The Best American Poetry 1994. Simon & Schuster. ISBN 978-0-671-89948-6.
- Kenneth Koch; Kate Farrell, eds. (1985). Talking to the sun: an illustrated anthology of poems for young people. Macmillan. ISBN 978-0-87099-436-4.

=== Biography ===
- AE (Amelia Earhart). Small Press Distribution. September 1984. ISBN 978-99941-79-90-9.
