= Tom Andrews (poet) =

American poet and critic

Tom Andrews (April 30, 1961 – July 18, 2001) was an American poet and critic.

== Life ==
Thomas Chester Andrews grew up in Charleston, West Virginia. He got into the Guinness World Records at the age of eleven by clapping for fourteen hours and thirty-one minutes. He had dreams of being a stand-up comedian. He raced motocross as a teenager, but he stopped when he found out he had hemophilia. He had a major accident on an icy sidewalk that put him in the hospital for many weeks.

He worked as a copy editor for "Mathematical Review," a bibliographic journal for mathematicians, physicists, statisticians, logicians, historians, and philosophers of mathematics.

While he is best known for his poetry, he also wrote criticism and a memoir, Codeine Diary: True Confessions of a Reckless Hemophiliac.

== Education ==
Andrews graduated from Hope College (Summa Cum Laude) in 1984, spending second semester of his senior year at Oberlin College as an intern for FIELD (magazine). In 1987 he graduated from the University of Virginia with an M.F.A. in Creative Writing.

== Poetry ==
Poet and critic Lisa Russ Spaar has called Tom Andrews "One of the great stylists — and one of the best, and under-known, poets — of the past 20 years." His collection, The Hemophiliac's Motorcycle, is available online for free through the University of Iowa Press.

Some scholars have examined his work through the lens of disability; as a hemophiliac, much of his poetry seems concerned with the body as spectacle, in its achievements as well as its limitations. As professor Susannah Mintz puts it in her article Lyric Bodies: Poets on Disability and Masculinity, published in PMLA in March 2012, "the speaker [of the title poem in The Hemophiliac's Motorcycle] presents himself as paradoxical: at risk and highly skilled, competitive and communal, worthy of respect for his talent and potentially feared or derided for the strange behavior of so metaphorically charged a substance as his blood."

== Personal life ==
Andrews married Carrie Garlinghouse in the late 1980s. They divorced in 1993.

At the time of his death, Andrews was engaged to Alice B. Paterakis of Athens, Greece, whom he had met at the American Academy in Rome, where both had been fellows. They were to be married the week before he died.

== Death ==
Andrews died in a London hospital on July 18, 2001, as a result of complications from thrombotic thrombocytopenic purpura, a rare blood disease. He was forty years old.

== Awards ==
- 1989 National Poetry Series Award, for The Brother’s Country
- 1993 Iowa Poetry Prize, for The Hemophiliac’s Motorcycle
- 2000 Rome Prize, Literature, from the American Academy of Arts and Letters
- 2001 Guggenheim Fellowship

== Works ==
=== Poetry ===
- Random Symmetries: The Collected Poems of Tom Andrews. Oberlin College Press. 2002. ISBN 978-0-932440-92-1.
- The Hemophiliac's Motorcycle. University of Iowa Press. 1994. ISBN 978-0-87745-452-6.
- Brother's Country. Persea Books. 1990. ISBN 978-0-89255-151-4.

=== Criticism ===
- "The World as L. Found It", The Ohio Review, No. 57, 1997
- On William Stafford: The Worth of Local Things. University of Michigan. 1995. ISBN 978-0-472-08321-3.
- The Point Where All Things Meet: Essays on Charles Wright. Oberlin College Press. 1995. ISBN 978-0-932440-72-3.

=== Memoir ===
- Codeine Diary: True Confessions of a Reckless Hemophiliac. Little, Brown. 1998. ISBN 978-0-316-04244-4.

=== Anthology ===
- Billy Collins, ed. (2003). Poetry 180: a turning back to poetry. Random House, Inc. ISBN 978-0-8129-6887-3.
- Charles Wright; David Lehman, eds. (2008). The Best American Poetry 2008. Simon and Schuster. ISBN 978-0-7432-9975-6.
- A. R. Ammons; David Lehman, eds. (1994). The Best American Poetry 1994. Simon & Schuster. ISBN 978-0-671-89948-6.
- Jennifer Bartlett; Shelia Black; Michael Northern, eds. (2011). Beauty Is A Verb The New Poetry of Disability. Cinco Puntos. ISBN 978-1-935955-05-4.
