= Jeffrey McDaniel =

American poet (born 1967)

- Born: 1967 (age 58–59); Philadelphia, Pennsylvania
- Education: Sarah Lawrence College (BA); George Mason University (MFA)
- Occupations: Poet, teacher, faculty advisor
- Writing career
- Genre: Poetry

Jeffrey McDaniel (born 1967) is an American poet. He has published six books of poetry, most recently Holiday in the Islands of Grief (University of Pittsburgh Press). He is the recipient of a creative writing fellowship from the National Endowment for the Arts. His writing has been included in Ploughshares, The Best American Poetry 1994, The Best American Poetry 2010, The Best American Poetry 2019, and The New Young American Poets, as well as on the National Endowment for the Arts website. He was born in Philadelphia, Pennsylvania.

McDaniel received a BA from Sarah Lawrence College in 1990, where he studied with Thomas Lux, Brooks Haxton, Kate Knapp-Johnson, Cornelius Eady, and Safiya Henderson-Holmes. In his senior year of college, McDaniel was in a weekly reading group with authors Joel Brouwer, Tessa Rumsey, and Marisa de los Santos, among others. A chapbook, The Boy Inside The Turtle, was published in 1989 by fellow student Gerry LaFemina.

McDaniel received an MFA from George Mason University in 1993, where he studied with C.K. Williams, Susan Tichy, and Carolyn Forche. In grad school, he was the poetry editor for the school's national literary magazine, Phoebe, in 1991–92, and the editor in 1992-93. He was also active in a student performance troupe, Poetry Theater (founded by Chris Carpenter), where grad students presented their poems in a theatrical context. In grad school, McDaniel first began publishing poems in magazines, including Ploughshares, Fine Madness, Exquisite Corpse, and Willow Springs. In his final year of grad school, he also got involved with the nascent poetry slam movement at the 15 Minutes Club in Washington DC. He was on a team (with Silvana Straw among others) to represent DC at the 1993 National Poetry Slam in San Francisco. He also represented Washington DC at the 1994 and '95 National Poetry Slams and Venice Beach (California) in the 1998 National Poetry Slam in Austin, Texas. McDaniel has not performed in a poetry slam since the late 1990s.

After grad school, McDaniel worked for DC WritersCorps, a poetry in the community project. Other DC WritersCorps members included DJ Renegade, Kenny Carroll, Joe Ray Sandoval, A, Van Jordan, Imani Tolliver, Brian Gilmore, and many other talented writers. From 1994-96, McDaniel co-hosted (with Silvana Straw) a monthly reading series at The Black Cat Club on 14th and T. Many talented writers performed there, including Henry Taylor, Carl Hancock Rux, Matt Cook, Crystal Williams, A.E. Stallings, and Jose Padua. During this time, McDaniel did a one-man show, Hunting For Cherubs, combining poetry, video, dance, and music, at the Washington Project for the Arts, produced by Ceridwen Morris.

McDaniel's first three books, Alibi School (1995), The Forgiveness Parade (1998), and The Splinter Factory (2002) were published by Manic D Press. In September 1996, he moved to the Silver Lake neighborhood of Los Angeles. He curated readings at Beyond Baroque Literary Arts Center in Venice Beach and taught poetry workshops at high schools throughout the city. From 1999-2001, he took a team of six high school poets (with the help of Derrick Brown) to Brave New Voices, the National Teen Poetry Slam.

Since 2001, he has been teaching creative writing at Sarah Lawrence College.

A compilation of selected poems, Katastrophenkunde, was translated into German by Ron Winkler and published in 2006. In 2010, he was one of five judges for the National Book award in poetry.

He is currently in the process of writing a new poetry book titled 4,000 A.M. He lives in Cold Spring, New York.

== Works ==
- Alibi School - Manic D Press 1995. ISBN 0-916397-38-6
- The Forgiveness Parade - Manic D Press 1998. ISBN 0-916397-55-6
- The Splinter Factory - Manic D Press 2002. ISBN 0-916397-79-3
- The Endarkenment - University of Pittsburgh Press 2008. ISBN 0-8229-5995-X
- Chapel of Inadvertent Joy - University of Pittsburgh Press 2013. ISBN 0-8229-6260-8
- Holidays in the Islands of Grief - University of Pittsburgh Press 2020. ISBN 08229-6610-7
