= Alice Jones (poet) =

American poet

Alice Jones is an American poet, physician, and psychoanalyst. Her most recent collection of poetry is Vault (Apogee Press, 2020). Her poems have appeared in literary journals and magazines including Kenyon Review, Ploughshares, Poetry, The Boston Review, The Denver Quarterly, and Verse. Her honors include fellowships from the Bread Loaf Writers Conference and the National Endowment for the Arts.

She is a training and supervising analyst on the faculty of the San Francisco Center for Psychoanalysis, and practices in Berkeley, California. She is a co-founder and former co-editor of Apogee Press.

== Awards ==
- 2013, "Plunge" was a finalist for the Northern California Book Award in Poetry
- 2009, First Annual Narrative Magazine Poetry Award
- 2006, Lyric Poetry Award (Poetry Society of America)
- 2001, Robert H. Winner Award (Poetry Society of America)
- 1999, Jane Kenyon Chapbook Award
- 1992, Beatrice Hawley Award
- 1994, NEA fellowship in poetry.

== Memoir ==
- Cadence of Vanishing. Unbound Edition Press. 2025. ISBN 979-8-991957557.

=== Full-length poetry collections ===
- Vault. Apogee Press. 2020. ISBN 978-1733137515.
- Plunge. Apogee Press. 2012. ISBN 978-0-9787667-9-5.
- Gorgeous Mourning. Apogee Press. 2004. ISBN 978-0-9744687-1-6.
- Extreme Directions (Omnidawn, 2002)
- The Knot (Alice James Books, 1992)

=== Chapbooks ===
- Anatomy (Bullnettle Press, 1992)
- Isthmus. Alice James Books. 2000. ISBN 978-1-882295-27-2.
