= Denise Duhamel =

American poet (born 1961)

Denise Duhamel (born 1961 in Woonsocket, Rhode Island) is an American poet.

== Background ==
Duhamel received her B.F.A. from Emerson College and her M.F.A. from Sarah Lawrence College. She is a New York Foundation for the Arts recipient and has been resident poet at Bucknell University. She has had residencies at Yaddo and the MacDowell Colony.

Duhamel's earliest books take a feminist slant, beginning with Smile (1993) and Girl Soldier (1996); The Woman with Two Vaginas (1995) explores Eskimo folklore from the same perspective. Her best selling and most popular book to date, Kinky (1997), marries her bent for satire, humor, and feminism in portraying an icon of popular culture, the Barbie doll, through an extended series of satirical postures ("Beatnik Barbie," "Buddhist Barbie," etc.). Two collections that followed, The Star Spangled Banner (1998) and Queen for a Day (2001), move more broadly into American culture to display the same satire through the lens of absurdity. Later work is formally various with pantoums, sestinas/double-sestinas, long surreal explorations of American life, and list poems (Mille et un sentiments [2005]). Two and Two (2005) and Ka Ching (2009) also have the same tone. Her poetry has been widely anthologized and has appeared in The Best American Poetry annuals.

Duhamel has also collaborated with Maureen Seaton on Little Novels, Oyl, and Exquisite Politics. Of this collaboration, Duhamel says, "Something magical happens when we write - we find this third voice, someone who is neither Maureen nor I, and our ego sort of fades into the background. The poem matters, not either one of us."

Duhamel names as some of her influences Lucille Ball, Roseanne Barr, Andrea Dworkin, Alyson Palmer, Amy Ziff and Elizabeth Ziff (who make up the singing group Betty), and the 70s television heroine Mary Hartman.

Denise Duhamel was married to the poet Nick Carbò. In 2008 they divorced. She now lives in Hollywood, Florida, and teaches creative writing and literature at Florida International University, and in the Low-Residency MFA at Converse College in Spartanburg, SC.

== Awards and honors ==
- 2013 National Book Critics Circle Award (Poetry) shortlist for Blowout
- 2014 Guggenheim Fellow
- 2024 Rattle Chapbook Prize Winner

== Works ==
- Second Story (University of Pittsburgh, 2021)
- Scald (University of Pittsburgh, 2017)
- Blowout (University of Pittsburgh, 2013)
- ABBA the Poems with Amy Lemmon (Coconut Books, 2010)
- Ka-Ching (University of Pittsburgh, 2009)
- Mille et un sentiments (Firewheel Editions, 2005)
- Two and Two (University of Pittsburgh, 2005)
- Queen for a Day: Selected and New Poems (University of Pittsburgh, 2001)
- The Star-Spangled Banner, winner of the Crab Orchard Series in Poetry Open Competition Awards (Southern Illinois University Press 1999)
- Kinky (Orchises Press, 1997)
- Girl Soldier (Garden Street Press, 1996)
- How the Sky Fell (1996)
- The Woman with Two Vaginas, (Salmon Run Press, 1995)
- Smile, (Warm Spring Press, 1993)

=== Chapbooks ===
- It's My Body (Egg In Hand Press, 1992)
- Skirted Issues (Stop Light Press, 1990)
- Heaven And Heck (Foundation Press, 1988, 1989, 1990)
- 237 More Reasons To Have Sex co-author: Sandy McIntosh (Otoliths, 2009)
- In Which (Rattle, 2024)
