= Be With =

Be With may refer to:

- Be With (album), a 2005 compilation album by Koushik
- Be With (poetry collection), a collection of poems by Forrest Gander
