= Silver (poetry collection) =

2024 poetry collection by Rowan Ricardo Phillips

Silver: Poems
- Author: Rowan Ricardo Phillips
- Publisher: Farrar, Straus and Giroux
- Publication date: March 5, 2024
- Pages: 80
- ISBN: 978-0374611316
- Preceded by: Living Weapon: Poems

Silver: Poems is a 2024 poetry collection by Rowan Ricardo Phillips, published by Farrar, Straus and Giroux. The book's poems utilize wide variety of techniques—ranging from elegy to terza rima—and discuss broad themes of faith, truth, and crisis, among others. Phillips' fourth collection, it was longlisted for the 2024 National Book Award for Poetry.

== Critical reception ==
Publishers Weekly called the book "Musical and erudite" and said "Readers will take pleasure in this poetical flowering." Library Journal wrote "From fox to car to misty morning, silver glints throughout this polished collection, woven in like meaningfulness in life. A strong entry, appealing for most readers."

Critics observed Phillips' approach to the value of poetry and the capacity of meaning writ large. NPR, in a group of poetry reviews alongside Modern Poetry by Diane Seuss and The Gone Thing by Monica McClure, assessed the book's argument for poetry in "an increasingly isolating and terrifying era". Open Letters Review found the book inconsistent but said "Still, when Phillips is good, he’s really good, conjuring up images as memorable as any in five thousand years of poetry."

Other critics analyzed the musicality of Phillips' poems. The Times Literary Supplement said Silver "is a book full of thought with the sound turned up. Its musical patterning, its syncopations and assonances, is pronounced and central to its movement and arguments". The Harvard Crimson similarly stated "Phillips makes it clear that his goal is not just to make poetry, but music."

The book appeared in several lists. The Guardian named it in a list of the best recent poetry in March 2024. LitHub mentioned it in a round-up of March 2024 releases. The Irish Times included it in a July article reviewing several books of poetry.
