= Tripas (poetry collection) =

2023 poetry collection by Brandon Som

Tripas: Poems
- Author: Brandon Som
- Publisher: Georgia Review Books
- Publication date: March 1, 2023
- Pages: 104
- Awards: Pulitzer Prize for Poetry
- ISBN: 978-0820363509
- Preceded by: The Tribute Horse

Tripas is a 2023 poetry collection by poet and professor Brandon Som, published by Georgia Review Books, an imprint under the University of Georgia Press by The Georgia Review. His second book of poems, it addresses his Mexican and Chinese heritages and lineages. It won the Pulitzer Prize for Poetry in 2024 and was a finalist for the 2023 National Book Award for Poetry.

== Background and contents ==
Som grew up in Phoenix, Arizona with a Mexican American mother and a Chinese American father. His 2014 debut poetry collection, The Tribute Horse, was an investigation into the Chinese side of his heritage.

With Tripas, a Spanish word that "can mean ‘tripe’, ‘intestines’, ‘innards’, ‘trivia’ or the pages of a document," Som addresses both sides of his background. Many of the poems refer to members of Som's family such as his Chicana grandmother, who was an industrial worker at a Motorola plant, or his Chinese American father's side of his family which ran a convenience store, as well as his father, who had cancer. In addressing his multicultural background, Som's broader themes for the book include diaspora, language, globalization, and capitalism.

In an interview with The Hopkins Review, Som remarked on the communal and cultural influences of the book's poems: "They were made in conversation and in translation with members of my family. And they are also attuned to popular and public forms of artistic expression: Ranchera music, Hong Kong and Mexican Cinema, Day of the Dead processions, ofrendas and lowriders, and the murals of José Clemente Orozco and Judy Baca." He also mentioned the historical significance of community organizers like Dolores Huerta and Cesar Chavez and cited labor as a "specific intersection of Mexican and Chinese communities".

== Critical reception ==
The Poetry Foundation lauded and observed Som's observation of "histories, plural." London Review of Books wrote "Tripas belongs to the literature of the border and the Southwest, to the still under-studied poetics of the polyglot melting pot. It is, of course, Asian American poetry and Xicano/a, or Mexican American, poetry too."

== Awards ==
The Pulitzer Prizes, upon awarding Som the poetry prize, called it "A collection that deeply engages with the complexities of the poet’s dual Mexican and Chinese heritage, highlighting the dignity of his family's working lives, creating community rather than conflict."

It was a finalist for the National Book Award for Poetry. The judges stated: "Full of ease and intimacy, Brandon Som's Tripas speaks of deep human connection in spite of society's disconnectedness ... These telephonic poems are as brilliant as the screens of our cell phones and as capable of illuminating the world."

| Year | Award | Category | Result | Ref. |
|---|---|---|---|---|
| 2023 | National Book Award | Poetry | Finalist | |
| 2024 | Pulitzer Prize | Poetry | Won | |
