= Spectral Evidence (poetry collection) =

2024 poetry collection by Gregory Pardlo

- Author: Gregory Pardlo
- Publisher: Knopf
- Publication date: January 30, 2024
- Pages: 128
- ISBN: 978-1524731786
- Preceded by: Air Traffic: A Memoir of Ambition and Manhood in America

Spectral Evidence is a 2024 poetry collection by Gregory Pardlo, published by Knopf. It is Pardlo's first major poetry collection since Pardlo won the 2015 Pulitzer Prize for Poetry for his 2014 book Digest. Spectral Evidence was longlisted for the 2024 National Book Award for Poetry.

== Contents and background ==
The book's title refers to spectral evidence, a legal term describing testimony through visions during the Salem witch trials.

Pardlo's poems specifically employ the notion of spectral evidence in order to observe modern-day prejudicial projection with regard to both race and gender, citing cases such as the killing of Michael Brown and the 1985 MOVE bombing. Moving between past and present, Pardlo's poems weave a racial genealogy between the sentencing of Tituba for witchcraft with more modern incidents of anti-blackness such as predictive policing or the medicalization of black bodies. Other figures mentioned include wrestler Owen Hart and saint Teresa of Ávila.

== Critical reception ==
In a starred review, Publishers Weekly said "With characteristic intelligence, Pardlo confronts uncomfortable and enduring truths." Also in a starred review, Library Journal called the book "Complex, linguistically rich, and unsparing in its analysis of both the current national psyche as well as the poet’s own". With an additional starred review, Booklist wrote that "Form, lyricism, and imagery are expertly presented, and the result is a compelling, cohesive collection addressing timely topics. A beautiful addition to Pardlo’s already impressive oeuvre."

Critics observed Pardlo's ambitious approach to history through his poems. The Los Angeles Review of Books called the book "exceptional" and observed "Pardlo’s sensitivity, emotional intelligence, and insistence on an embodied (distinctly not spectral) treatment of race and womanhood." The Las Vegas Review of Books said "Through dad jokes and endnotes, legal briefs and altar pieces, Pardlo has crafted an impressive collection that speaks with poetic urgency to our own weighty moment." The Poetry Foundation analyzed Pardlo's approach to black life with mention of works by Frantz Fanon, Isabel Wilkerson, and Audre Lorde.
