= Spectral Evidence =

Spectral Evidence may refer to:

- Spectral evidence, a form of legal evidence based upon the testimony of those who claim to have experienced visions
- Spectral Evidence (1997 book), a book by Moira Johnston about the Gary Ramona false memory case
- Spectral Evidence (poetry collection), a 2024 poetry collection by Gregory Pardlo
