= 3 Sections =

2013 poetry collection

- Official Cover Design for 3 Sections
- Author: Vijay Seshadri
- Genre: Poetry
- Publisher: Graywolf Press
- Publication date: 2013
- Publication place: United States of America
- ISBN: 978-1-55597-716-0

3 Sections is a 2013 poetry collection written by Vijay Seshadri and published by Graywolf Press. It won the Pulitzer Prize for Poetry in 2014.

== Description ==
3 sections is mostly made up of free verse poems, though the collection notably includes a prose piece ("Pacific Fishes of Canada") and a long-form poem ("Personal Essay"). Despite the collection's title, the divisions between the eponymous "3 Sections" remain ambiguous, possibly separated into "divisions of contemporary life—a wayward history, an indeterminate future, and a perpectual long to out-think time" or divided by form (free verse poems / prose / long poem).

== Reception and critical engagement ==
The Pulitzer citation for the collection called the book,

"a compelling collection of poems that examine human consciousness, from birth to dementia, in a voice that is by turns witty and grave, compassionate and remorseless."

Lauren Hilger in Green Mountain Review argued that the collection's inclusion of an essay-like prose piece is a call for readers to reevaluate their definitions of poetry.
