= Still Life (poetry collection) =

2022 poetry collection by Jay Hopler

- Author: Jay Hopler
- Publisher: McSweeney's
- Publication date: June 7, 2022
- Pages: 63
- ISBN: 978-1952119378
- Preceded by: The Abridged History of Rainfall

Still Life is a 2022 poetry collection by Jay Hopler. It was a finalist for the 2023 Pulitzer Prize for Poetry and was longlisted for the 2022 National Book Award for Poetry.

== Background ==
In 2017, Hopler was diagnosed with terminal prostate cancer; he was told that he had only two years to live, after which he challenged himself "to write a book in twenty-four months." From then on, as he lived with his condition, he began writing the poems that would be collected in Still Life; his wife, Kimberly Johnson, would also write her own poetry collection, Fatal, about the diagnosis, which would also be released in 2022.

In three sections, the poems in Still Life address Hopler's diagnosis, his Puerto Rican heritage, and other topics including a "duet" with Johnny Cash and various allusions to animals. The book ends with a self-obituary. Hopler passed in 2022 one week after the book's publication. In The Rumpus that November, Johnson wrote:

"Even before, but pronouncedly after, Jay's diagnosis, he and I spoke often about what it means to write a last book, to produce a poetic artifact that endures beyond the self. What poetry can offer in the way of immortality. And what it can't."

== Critical reception ==
Time included the book in their list of 100 must-reads for 2022, stating that "In the wake of a terminal cancer diagnosis, poet Jay Hopler pondered his own mortality with wit, searing insight, and a clear-eyed sense of courage".

Critics admired Hopler's reflections on mortality laden with humor. River Mouth Review observed the book's duality: "Still Life is a disconcerting book in the same way memorial services can be disconcerting: mourners go from making crass, perhaps even cruel jokes in each other’s ears to breaking down in tears and locking themselves in the restroom." Blackbird similarly said that "Hopler’s work has always been marked by self-deprecating humor—a lamentation of a tortured existence and a resentment for having been born at all—and this characteristic pinnacles in Still Life." Poetry International Online said "The book seems to be both a representation of all the moving parts of the dying, as well as an antithesis to how we usually converse about death, namely a dying person." The Rumpus concluded, "What else can I feel but humility and admiration for these poems, which grieve and celebrate a life with so much care?"
