= Johns Hopkins Writing Seminars =

Academic program at Johns Hopkins University

Founded in 1947, the Johns Hopkins Writing Seminars is an academic program offering undergraduate and graduate degrees in writing in the Zanvyl Krieger School of Arts & Sciences at Johns Hopkins University. It is the second-oldest creative writing program in the United States.

Notable faculty of the program have included Edward Albee, John Barth, Madison Smartt Bell, J. M. Coetzee, Stephen Dixon, Mark Hertsgaard, Brad Leithauser, John Irwin, J.D. McClatchy, Alice McDermott, Mark Crispin Miller, Wyatt Prunty, Mary Jo Salter, David St. John, Mark Strand, Robert Stone, and Edmund White.

Poet Dora Malech currently chairs the program, which has a strong reputation. It has been ranked "One of the Top Ten Graduate Programs in Creative Writing" by The Atlantic, and in 2020 was ranked as the #1 creative writing program by creativewritingmfa.info. In 1997, U.S. News & World Report ranked the program second in the United States out of sixty-five eligible full-residency MFA programs. In 2011, Poets & Writers ranked Hopkins seventeenth nationally out of 157 eligible full-residency MFA programs. The long respected Science Writing program was closed down in 2013 as an on-campus program, but was re-established as an online/low residency program shortly thereafter.

== Degree programs ==
- Writing Seminars B.A. Degree
- MFA in Fiction and Poetry

== Notable graduates ==
The Johns Hopkins Writing Seminars has produced many prominent authors, writers, and artists including Chimamanda Ngozi Adichie, Gina Apostol, John Astin, Jami Attenberg, Beth Bachmann, Russell Baker, Ned Balbo, John Barth, Frederick Barthelme, Jill Bialosky, Jeffrey Blitz, Paul Harris Boardman, Jennifer Finney Boylan, Lucie Brock-Broido, John Gregory Brown, Vikram Chandra (novelist), Iris Chang, Wes Craven, Erica Dawson, Elizabeth DeVita-Raeburn, Timothy Donnelly, Esi Edugyan, Louise Erdrich, Nell Greenfieldboyce, Martha Grimes, Rachel Hadas, Gil Scott-Heron, Elin Hilderbrand, Lawrence Hill, Richie Hofmann, Jay Hopler, Kimberly Johnson, Pagan Kennedy, Porochista Khakpour, Wayne Koestenbaum, Tim Kreider, Phillis Levin, David Lipsky, Richard Macksey, Rosemary Mahoney, Emma Marris, Michael Martone, P.J. O'Rourke, ZZ Packer, Molly Peacock, Joanna Pearson, Hollis Robbins, Mary Robison, Deborah Rudacille, Karl Shapiro, Tom Sleigh, Elizabeth Spires, Lorin Stein, Susan Stewart, Rosanna Warren, Rachel Wetzsteon, Greg Williamson, and Jenny Xie.

Graduates from the Writing Seminars have won the Pulitzer Prize, the MacArthur “Genius” Award, the National Book Award, the National Book Critics Circle Award, the Library of Congress Prize for American Fiction, the Whiting Award, the PEN/Saul Bellow Award for Achievement in American Fiction, the F. Scott Fitzgerald Award for Outstanding Achievement in American Fiction, the Truman Capote Award for Literary Criticism, the Rea Award for the Short Story, the Pushcart Prize, the Commonwealth Writers’ Prize, the Giller Prize, the Guggenheim Fellowship, the Anisfield-Wolf Book Award, the Dramatic Director Prize at the Sundance Film Festival, a Grammy Lifetime Achievement Award, and other accolades.

== Turnbull Lectures ==
The Writing Seminars hosts the Turnbull Lectures, a yearly lecture series on the topic of poetry. The series was established in 1891 and has run almost continuously between the years 1891–1984 and 2000–present. Over the history of the series, lectures have been given by Ramón Menéndez Pidal, T.S. Eliot, W.H. Auden, Emil G. Hirsch, Marianne Moore, Robert Frost, Jacques Derrida, W.S. Merwin, William Gass, Harold Bloom, Helen Vendler, and many others. Recent lecturers have included Anne Carson, Natasha Trethewey, Robin Coste Lewis, Alice Oswald, Tracy K. Smith, Terrance Hayes, Richard Wilbur, Paul Muldoon, Stanley Plumly, Edward Mendelson, and Edna Longley.

== See also ==
- The Hopkins Review
