= The World Doesn't End =

Poetry collection

- Cover Page for The World Doesn't End
- Author: Charles Simic
- Genre: Poetry
- Publisher: Harcourt Brace Jovanovich
- Publication date: 1989
- Publication place: United States of America
- ISBN: 978-0156983501

The World Doesn't End (1989) is a collection of prose poems by Charles Simic. The collection won the Pulitzer Prize for Poetry in 1990.

== Contents ==
The collection begins with an epigraph from Fats Waller: "Let's waltz the Rumba."

The collection is divided into three parts of untitled prose poems, each ranging between two and five lines. Each poem is indicated in the collection's table of contents by the first several words of each poem:

Part I

[my mother was]
[Scaliger turns deadly]
[I was stolen]
[It's a store]
[She's pressing me]
[We were so poor]
[I am the last]
[Everybody knows the]
[He held the Beast]
[It was the epoch]
[Ghost stories written]
[In the fourth year]
[The city had fallen]
[I Played in the Smallest Theatres]
[The stone is]
[They wheeled out]
[Lover of endless]
[The flies]
[History lesson]

Part II

[The hundred-year-old]
[In a forest of]
[Everything's foreseeable]
[He calls one dog]
[A dog with a soul]
[Time—the lizard]
[Margaret was copying]
[A poem about sitting]
[Dear Friedrich]
[Tropical luxuriance]
[The clouds told him]
[Are Russian cannibals]
[An actor pretending]
[The dead man]
[My guardian angel]
[The dog went]
[Things were not]
[A hen larger]
[The old farmer]
[The rat kept]
[O witches, O poverty]
[Once I knew]
[The ideal spectator]
[Thousands of old men]
[My thumb is]
[Gospel]

Part III

[M.]
[A century]
[A black child]
[Police dogs]
[Ambiguity created by]
[The time of minor poets]
[At least four]
[Comedy of errors]
[The fat man]
[A week-long holiday]
[Lots of people]
[O the great God]
[I knew a night owl]
[My father loved]
[An arctic voyager]
[All this gets us]
[From inside the pot]
[Where ignorance is]
[He had mixed up]
[Someone shuffles]
[A much dwindled]
[My Secret Identity Is]

== Reception ==
Some critics have credited The World Doesn't End with a resurgence of the prose poem form in American Poetry. Christopher Buckley argued that Simic chose the prose poem form because it most closely approximates the Eastern European folk tale.

== Works cited ==
- Dourado, Maysa Cristina S. (3 March 2017). "Charles Simic's "The World Doesn't End": Prose Poems". A Cor das Letras. 9 (1): 197. doi:10.13102/cl.v9i1.1550.
- Lux, Thomas (1989). "Review of The World Doesn't End". Harvard Book Review (11/12): 9. ISSN 1080-6067. JSTOR 27545354.
- Christopher Buckley (2008). Weigl, Bruce (ed.). Charles Simic: Essays on the Poetry. University of Michigan Press. ISBN 9780472107131.
