= Kay Ryan =

American poet

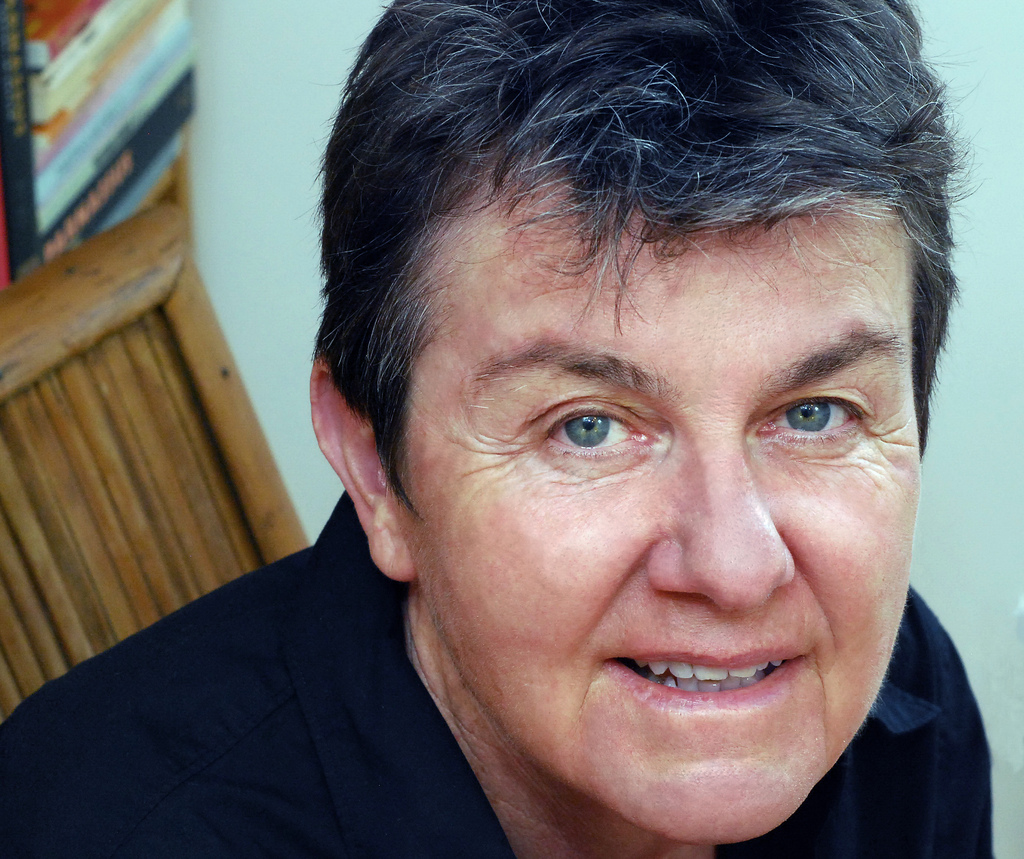
- Born: September 21, 1945 (age 80); San Jose, California, U.S.
- Education: Antelope Valley College; University of California, Los Angeles (BA, MA)
- Occupations: Poet, educator
- Partner: Carol Adair (1978–2009†)
- Writing career
- Period: 1970s–present
- Genre: Poetry
- Notable work: The Best of It: New and Selected Poems (2010)
- Notable awards: Guggenheim Fellowship (2004); Ruth Lilly Poetry Prize (2004); United States Poet Laureate (2008–2010); Pulitzer Prize for Poetry (2011); MacArthur Fellowship (2011)

Kay Ryan (born September 21, 1945) is an American poet and educator. She has published seven volumes of poetry and an anthology of selected and new poems. From 2008 to 2010 she was the sixteenth United States Poet Laureate. In 2011 she was named a MacArthur Fellow and she won the Pulitzer Prize.

== Biography ==
Ryan was born in San Jose, California, and was raised in several areas of the San Joaquin Valley and the Mojave Desert. After attending Antelope Valley College, she received bachelor's and master's degrees in English from University of California, Los Angeles. Since 1971, she has lived in Marin County, California, and has taught English part-time at the College of Marin in Kentfield. Carol Adair, who was also an instructor at the College of Marin, was Ryan's partner from 1978 until Adair's death in 2009.

Her first collection, Dragon Acts to Dragon Ends, was privately published in 1983 with the help of friends. While she found a commercial publisher for her second collection, Strangely Marked Metal (1985), her work went nearly unrecognized until the mid-1990s, when some of her poems were anthologized and the first reviews in national journals were published. She became widely recognized following her receipt of the Ruth Lilly Poetry Prize in 2004, and published her sixth collection of poetry, The Niagara River, in 2005.

In July 2008, the U.S. Library of Congress announced that Ryan would be the sixteenth United States Poet Laureate for a one-year term commencing in Autumn 2008. She succeeded Charles Simic. In April 2009, the Library announced that Ryan would serve a second one-year term extending through May 2010. She was succeeded by W.S. Merwin in June 2010.

She is a lesbian, and was the first openly lesbian United States Poet Laureate.

== Poetry ==
The Poetry Foundation's website characterizes Ryan's poems as follows: "Like Emily Dickinson and Marianne Moore before her, Ryan delights in quirks of logic and language and teases poetry out of the most unlikely places. She regards the 'rehabilitation of clichés,' for instance, as part of the poet’s mission. Characterized by subtle, surprising rhymes and nimble rhythms, her compact poems are charged with sly wit and off-beat wisdom." J. D. McClatchy included Ryan in his 2003 anthology of contemporary American poetry. He wrote in his introduction, "Her poems are compact, exhilarating, strange affairs, like Satie miniatures or Cornell boxes. … There are poets who start with lived life, still damp with sorrow or uncertainty, and lead it towards ideas about life. And there are poets who begin with ideas and draw life in towards their speculations. Marianne Moore and May Swenson were this latter sort of artist; so is Kay Ryan."

Ryan's poems are often quite short. In one of the first essays on Ryan, Dana Gioia wrote about this aspect of her poetry:

"Ryan reminds us of the suggestive power of poetry–how it elicits and rewards the reader’s intellect, imagination, and emotions. I like to think that Ryan’s magnificently compressed poetry – along with the emergence of other new masters of the short poem like Timothy Murphy and H.L. Hix and the veteran maestri like Ted Kooser and Dick Davis – signals a return to concision and intensity."

He went on to state that Ryan tends to avoid using the personal "I" in her poetry, claiming that she "didn’t want confession. [She] didn’t want to be Anne Sexton." Though distanced, her work is often deeply introspective, analyzing both the nature of the mind and the ability of language to mold reality.

Many reviewers have noted an affinity between Ryan's poetry and Marianne Moore's.

In addition to the oft-remarked affinity with Moore, affinities with poets May Swenson, Stevie Smith, Emily Dickinson, Wendy Cope, and Amy Clampitt have been noted by some critics. Thus, Katha Pollitt wrote that Ryan's fourth collection, Elephant Rocks (1997), is "Stevie Smith rewritten by William Blake" but that Say Uncle (2000) "is like a poetical offspring of George Herbert and the British comic poet Wendy Cope." Another reviewer of Say Uncle (2000) wrote of Ryan, "Her casual manner and nods to the wisdom tradition might endear her to fans of A. R. Ammons or link her distantly to Emily Dickinson. But her tight structures, odd rhymes and ethical judgments place her more firmly in the tradition of Marianne Moore and, latterly, Amy Clampitt."

Ryan's wit, quirkiness, and slyness are often noted by reviewers of her poetry, but Jack Foley emphasizes her essential seriousness. In his review of Say Uncle he writes, "There is, in short, far more darkness than 'light' in this brilliant, limited volume. Kay Ryan is a serious poet writing serious poems, and she resides on a serious planet (a word she rhymes with 'had it'). Ryan can certainly be funny, but it is rarely without a sting." Some of these disjoint qualities in her work are illustrated by her poem "Outsider Art", which Harold Bloom selected for the anthology The Best of the Best American Poetry 1988–1997.

Ryan is also known for her extensive use of internal rhyme. She refers to her specific methods of using internal rhyme as "recombinant rhyme." She claims that she had a hard time "tak[ing] end-rhyme seriously," and uses recombinant rhyme to bring structure and form to her work. As for other types of form, Ryan claims that she cannot use them, stating that it is "like wearing the wrong clothes."

== Honors and awards ==
Ryan's awards include a 1995 award from the Ingram Merrill Foundation, the 2000 Union League Poetry Prize, the 2001 Maurice English Poetry Award for her collection Say Uncle, a fellowship in 2001 from the National Endowment for the Arts, a 2004 Guggenheim Fellowship, and the 2004 Ruth Lilly Poetry Prize. Her poems have been included in three Pushcart Prize anthologies, and have been selected four times for The Best American Poetry; "Outsider Art" was selected by Harold Bloom for The Best of the Best American Poetry 1988–1997. Since 2006, Ryan has served as one of fourteen Chancellors of The Academy of American Poets. On January 22, 2011, Ryan was listed as a finalist for a 2011 National Book Critics Circle Award. On April 18, 2011, she won the annual Pulitzer Prize for Poetry, calling her collection The Best of It: New and Selected Poems (Grove Press) "a body of work spanning 45 years, witty, rebellious and yet tender, a treasure trove of an iconoclastic and joyful mind."

On September 20, 2011, Ryan was awarded a John D. and Catherine T. MacArthur Foundation Fellowship, or "genius grant".

In 2013, she received a 2012 National Humanities Medal from President Barack Obama. She was a 2015 invited Fellow at the James Merrill House in Stonington, CT.

== Poetry collections ==
- —— (1983). Dragon Acts to Dragon Ends. Fairfax, California: Taylor Street Press. ISBN 9780911407006.
- —— (1985). Strangely Marked Metal. Providence, Rhode Island: Copper Beech Press. ISBN 9780914278467.
- —— (1994). Flamingo Watching. Providence, Rhode Island: Copper Beech Press. ISBN 9780914278641.
- —— (1996). Elephant Rocks. New York: Grove Press. ISBN 9780802115867.
- —— (2000). Say Uncle. New York: Grove Press. ISBN 9780802137173.
- —— (2005). The Niagara River. New York: Grove Press. ISBN 9780802142221.
- —— (2008). Jam Jar Lifeboat & Other Novelties Exposed. Illustrated by Carl Dern. San Francisco: Red Berry Editions. ISBN 9780981578118.
- —— (2010). The Best of It: New and Selected Poems. New York: Grove Press. ISBN 9780802119148.
- —— (2015). Erratic Facts. New York: Grove Press. ISBN 9780802124050.
