= Charles Simic =

Serbian-born American poet (1938–2023)

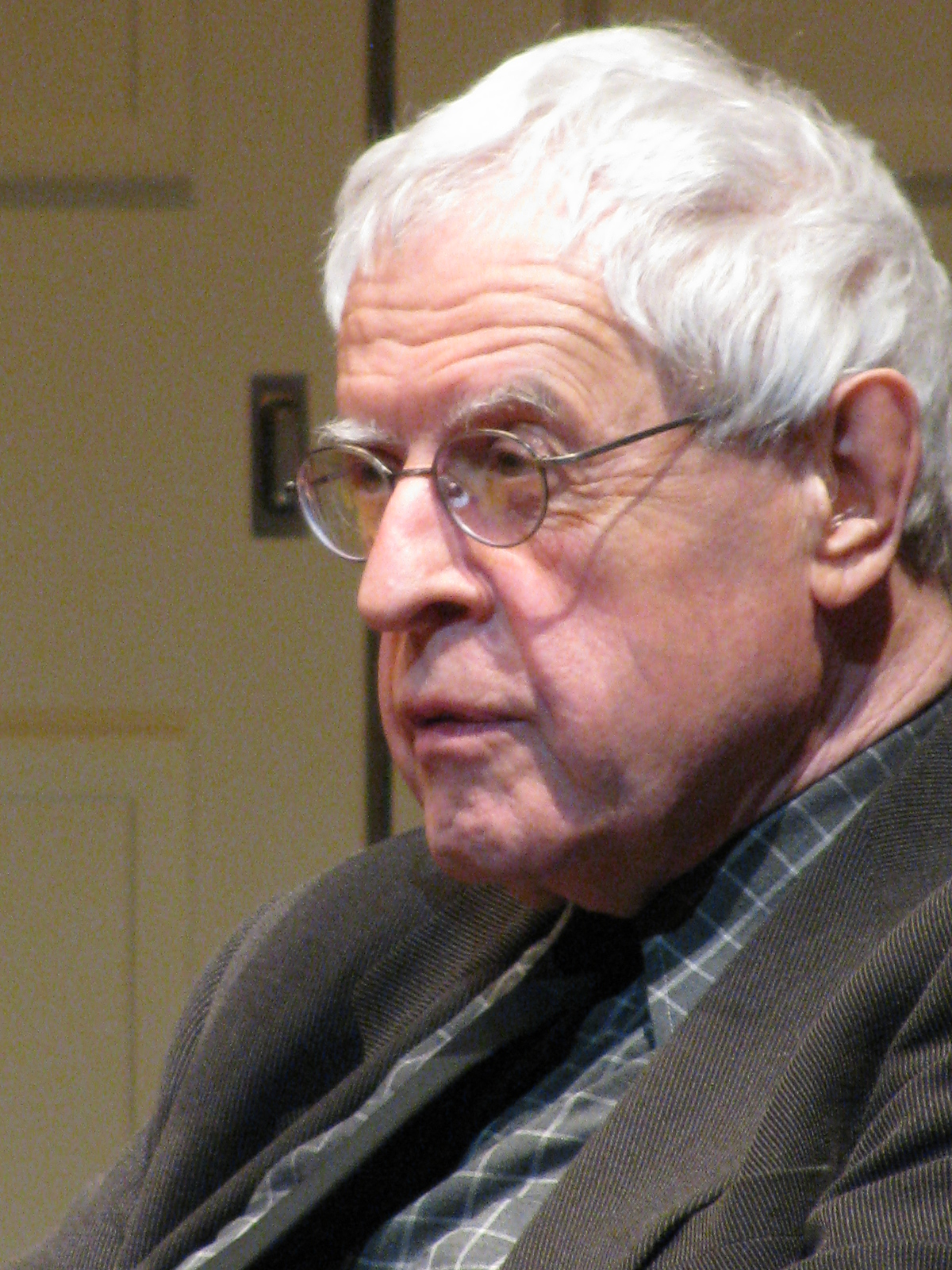
- Simic in 2015
- Born: Dušan Simić; May 9, 1938; Belgrade, Yugoslavia
- Died: January 9, 2023 (aged 84); Dover, New Hampshire, U.S.
- Education: New York University (BA)
- Occupation: Poet
- Writing career
- Notable awards: Pulitzer Prize for Poetry (1990); Wallace Stevens Award (2007); Zbigniew Herbert International Literary Award (2014)

15th United States Poet Laureate
- In office August 2, 2007 – May 8, 2008
- Preceded by: Donald Hall
- Succeeded by: Kay Ryan

Dušan Simić (Serbian Cyrillic: Душан Симић, pronounced [dǔʃan sǐːmitɕ]; May 9, 1938 – January 9, 2023), known as Charles Simic, was a Serbian American poet and poetry co-editor of The Paris Review. He received the Pulitzer Prize for Poetry in 1990 for The World Doesn't End and was a finalist of the Pulitzer Prize in 1986 for Selected Poems, 1963–1983 and in 1987 for Unending Blues. He was appointed the fifteenth United States Poet Laureate in 2007.

== Biography ==
=== Early years ===
Dušan Simić was born in Belgrade. In his early childhood, during World War II, he and his family were forced to evacuate their home several times to escape indiscriminate bombing of Belgrade. Growing up as a child in war-torn Europe shaped much of his worldview, Simic stated. In an interview from the Cortland Review he said, "Being one of the millions of displaced persons made an impression on me. In addition to my own little story of bad luck, I heard plenty of others. I'm still amazed by all the vileness and stupidity I witnessed in my life."

Simic immigrated to the United States with his brother and mother to join his father in 1954, when he was sixteen. After spending a year in New York, he moved with his family to Oak Park, Illinois, where he graduated from high school. In 1961, he was drafted into the U.S. Army, and in 1966, he earned his B.A. from New York University while working at night to cover the costs of tuition.

=== Career ===
Simic began to make a name for himself in the early to mid-1970s as a literary minimalist, writing terse, imagistic poems. Critics have referred to Simic's poems as "tightly constructed Chinese puzzle boxes". He himself stated: "Words make love on the page like flies in the summer heat and the poet is merely the bemused spectator."

He was a professor of American literature and creative writing at University of New Hampshire beginning in 1973 and lived in Strafford, New Hampshire. Simic wrote on such diverse topics as jazz, art, and philosophy. He was influenced by Emily Dickinson, Pablo Neruda, and Fats Waller. He was a translator, essayist, and philosopher, opining on the current state of contemporary American poetry. He held the position of poetry editor of The Paris Review and was later replaced by Dan Chiasson. He was elected to the American Academy of Arts and Letters in 1995, received the Academy Fellowship in 1998, and was elected a chancellor of the Academy of American Poets in 2000.

Simic was one of the judges for the 2007 Griffin Poetry Prize and continued to contribute poetry and prose to The New York Review of Books. He received the US$100,000 Wallace Stevens Award in 2007 from the Academy of American Poets.

Simic was selected by James H. Billington, Librarian of Congress, to be the fifteenth United States Poet Laureate, succeeding Donald Hall. In choosing Simic as the poet laureate, Billington cited "the rather stunning and original quality of his poetry".

In 2011, Simic was the recipient of the Frost Medal, presented annually for "lifetime achievement in poetry".

Simic's extensive papers as well as other material about his work are held at the University of New Hampshire Library Milne Special Collections and Archives.

=== Personal life and death ===
Simic married fashion designer Helene Dubin in 1964, and their union produced two children. In 1971, he became an American citizen. Simic died of complications of dementia on January 9, 2023, at age 84.

== Awards ==
- PEN Translation Prize (1980)
- Ingram Merrill Foundation Fellowship (1983)
- MacArthur Fellowship (1984–1989)
- Pulitzer Prize finalist (1986)
- Pulitzer Prize finalist (1987)
- Pulitzer Prize for Poetry (1990)
- Wallace Stevens Award (2007)
- Frost Medal (2011)
- Vilcek Prize in Literature (2011)
- Zbigniew Herbert International Literary Award (2014)
- Golden Wreath of the Struga Poetry Evenings (2017)

== Bibliography ==
=== Poetry ===
Collections

- 1967: What the Grass Says: Poems. San Francisco: Kayak. 1967.
- 1969: Somewhere Among Us a Stone Is Taking Notes. 1969.
- 1971: Dismantling the Silence
- 1972: White
- 1974: Return to a Place Lit by a Glass of Milk
- 1976: Biography and a Lament
- 1977: Charon's Cosmology
- 1978: Brooms: Selected Poems
- 1978: School for Dark Thoughts
- 1980: They Forage at Night
- 1980: Classic Ballroom Dances
- 1982: Austerities
- 1983: Weather Forecast for Utopia & Vicinity: Poems, 1967–1982
- 1985: Selected Poems, 1963–1983 (1986 Pulitzer Prize finalist; included in Harold Bloom's Western Canon)
- 1986: Unending Blues (1987 Pulitzer Prize finalist)
- 1989: Pyramids and Sphinxes
- 1989: Nine Poems
- 1989: The World Doesn't End: Prose Poems (1990 Pulitzer Prize for Poetry)
- 1990: The Book of Gods and Devils
- 1992: Hotel Insomnia
- 1994: A Wedding in Hell: Poems
- 1995: Frightening Toys
- 1996: Walking the Black Cat: Poems, (National Book Award in Poetry finalist)
- 1997: Looking for Trouble: Selected Early and More Recent Poems. Faber and Faber. 1997. ISBN 978-0-571-19233-5.
- 1999: Jackstraws: Poems (The New York Times Notable Book of the Year) ISBN 978-0-15-601098-6
- 1999: Simic, Charles (1999). Selected Early Poems. ISBN 978-0-8076-1456-3.
- 2001: Night Picnic, ISBN 978-0-15-100630-4
- 2003: The Voice at 3:00 am: Selected Late and New Poems ISBN 978-0-15-603073-1
- 2004: Selected Poems: 1963–2003 (winner of the 2005 International Griffin Poetry Prize)
- 2005: Aunt Lettuce, I Want to Peek Under Your Skirt (illustrated by Howie Michels)
- 2005: My Noiseless Entourage: Poems ISBN 978-0-15-101214-5
- 2008: 60 Poems, ISBN 978-0-15-603564-4
- 2008: That Little Something: Poems ISBN 978-0-15-603539-2
- 2008: The Monster Loves His Labyrinth: Notebooks, ISBN 978-1-931337-40-3
- 2010: Master of Disguises, Poems. Houghton Mifflin Harcourt. 2010. ISBN 978-0-547-50453-7.
- 2013: New and Selected Poems: 1962–2012. Houghton Mifflin Harcourt. 2013. ISBN 978-0-547-92830-2.
- 2013: Selected Early Poems. George Braziller Inc. 2013. ISBN 978-0-8076-1620-8.
- 2015: The Lunatic. HarperCollins/Ecco. 2015. ISBN 978-0-06-236474-6.
- 2017: Scribbled in the Dark. HarperCollins/Ecco. 2017. ISBN 978-0-06-266117-3.
- 2019: Come Closer and Listen: New Poems. New York: Ecco. 2019. ISBN 978-0-06-290846-9.
- 2022: No Land in Sight: Poems. Knopf. 2022. ISBN 978-0-593-53493-9.

Translations

- 1970: Ivan V. Lalić, Fire Gardens
- 1970: Vasko Popa, The Little Box: Poems
- 1970: Four Modern Yugoslav Poets: Ivan V. Lalić, Branko Miljkovic, Milorad Pavić, Ljubomir Simović
- 1979: Vasko Popa, Homage to the Lame Wolf: Selected Poems
- 1983: Co-translator, Slavko Mihalić, Atlantis
- 1987: Tomaž Šalamun, Selected Poems
- 1987: Ivan V. Lalić, Roll Call of Mirrors
- 1989: Aleksandar Ristović, Some Other Wine or Light
- 1991: Slavko Janevski, Bandit Wind
- 1992: Novica Tadić, Night Mail: Selected Poems
- 1992: Horse Has Six Legs: Contemporary Serbian Poetry
- 1999: Aleksandar Ristović, Devil's Lunch
- 2003: Radmila Lazić, A Wake for the Living
- 2004: Günter Grass, The Günter Grass Reader
- 2019: Vasko Popa, Selected Poems

List of poems

Title	Year	First published	Reprinted/collected
Left out of the Bible	2021	Simic, Charles (May 31, 2021). "Left out of the Bible". The New Yorker. 97 (14): 45.	
Windy day	2021	Simic, Charles (September 20, 2021). "Windy day". The New Yorker. 97 (29): 65.	

=== Non-fiction ===
- 1985: The Uncertain Certainty: Interviews, Essays, and Notes on Poetry
- 1990: Wonderful Words, Silent Truth: Essays on Poetry and a Memoir
- 1992: Dime-Store Alchemy: The Art of Joseph Cornell
- 1994: The Unemployed Fortune-Teller: Essays and Memoirs
- 1997: Orphan Factory: Essays and Memoirs
- 2000: A Fly in the Soup: Memoirs
- 2003: The Metaphysician in the Dark (University of Michigan Press, Poets on Poetry Series)
- 2006: Memory Piano. University of Michigan Press, Poets on Poetry Series. 2006. ISBN 978-0-472-06940-8.
- 2008: The Renegade: Writings on Poetry and a Few Other Things
- 2015: The Life of Images: Selected Prose

== See also ==
- Biljana D. Obradović
- Serbs in America
