= Koushik =

Bengali-Canadian electronic musician

Koushik Ghosh, known professionally simply as Koushik, is a Bengali-Canadian electronic musician from Dundas, Ontario. Koushik is signed to Stones Throw Records and has released a collection of singles and EPs from 2001–2005 on that label, Be With (2005), and the debut full length, Out my Window (2008). He has worked with Four Tet, Caribou, and remixed Madvillain.

== Career ==
Koushik's music has been described as "1960s psychedelic pop" tinged with "spacey soul," "ethereal," and "frugal astral jazz, gentle funk ... and folk" cobbled together. His recordings are notable for his "breathy," heavily processed vocals laid over instrumental tracks with a hip-hop feel.

While his earlier releases on EP, and the collected release Be With, received less enthusiastic reviews and was described as "a nascent musician finding his feet," the LP Out My Window received a 7.9/10 from Pitchfork, a 7/10 from Pop Matters, and an 8/10 from Drowned in Sound. This later sound was described as "a candyland of lilting psychedelic moods and stoner nostalgia where songs undulate, shift form, and drool into one another..."

Outside of Ghosh's solo project, he also performs with Caribou as part of the Caribou Vibration Ensemble.

== Personal life ==
Ghosh is a first-generation Canadian who studied classical Indian music as a child. Ghosh has master's degrees in biostatistics and ethnomusicology from the University of Vermont. In 2008, NPR reported that Koushik was living in upstate Vermont.

== Discography ==
=== Albums ===
- Be With (collection of singles and EPs)
- Out My Window
- KG Rhythm Trax
- Beep Tape
- Out My Window: Ghostless Edition (Instrumentals & Bonus Beats)

=== EPs ===
- Battle Times EP
- One In A Day EP
- Stones Throw White Label Remixes
- Madvillain: Koushik Remixes
- Cold Beats / Cold Heat (with Percee P)
