= Gregory Pardlo =

American poet, writer, and professor (born 1968)

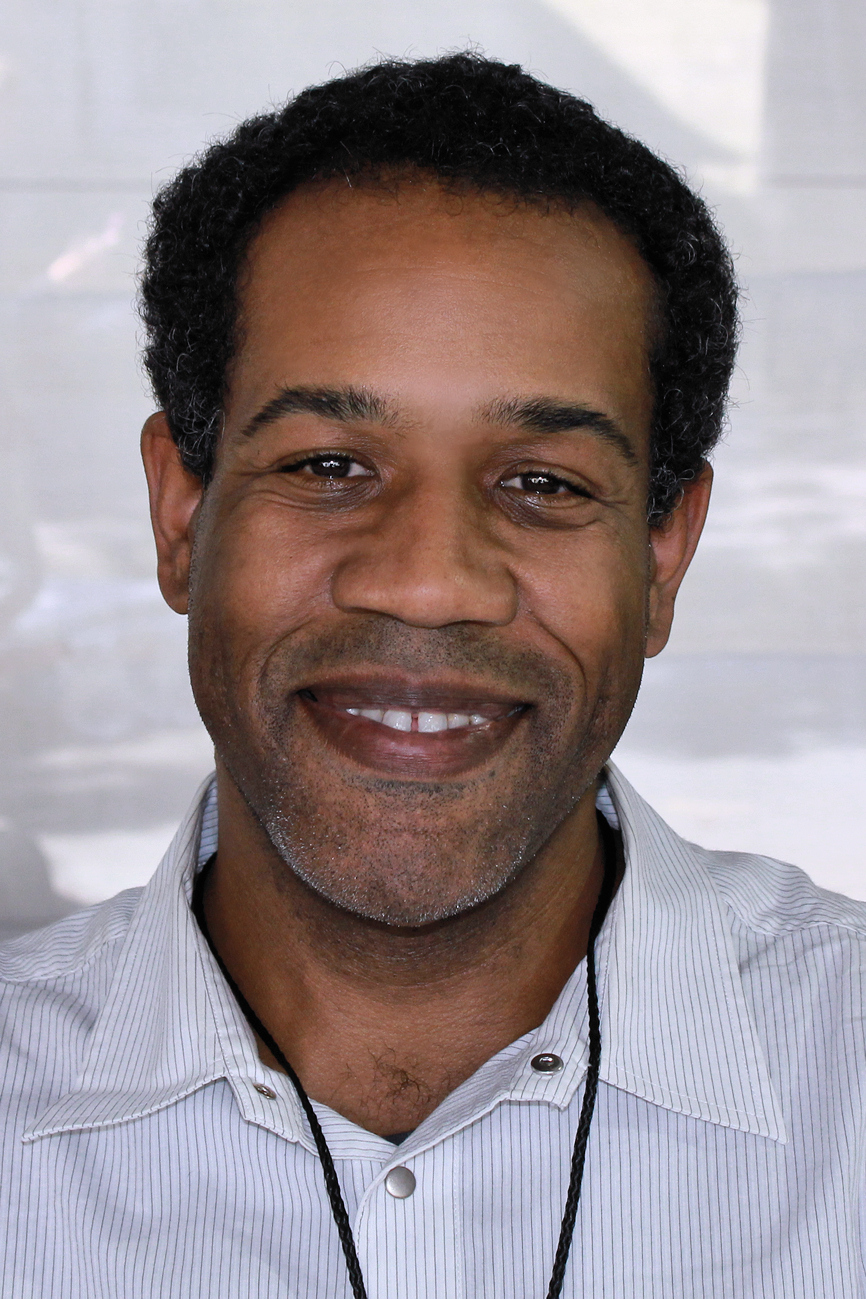
- Pardlo at the 2015 Texas Book Festival.
- Born: November 24, 1968 (age 57); Philadelphia, Pennsylvania, U.S.
- Education: Rutgers University, Camden (BA); New York University (MFA); Columbia University (MFA); City University of New York
- Writing career
- Genre: Poetry
- Notable awards: Pulitzer Prize for Poetry

Gregory Pardlo (born November 24, 1968) is an American poet, writer, and professor. His book Digest won the 2015 Pulitzer Prize for Poetry. His poems, reviews, and translations have appeared in The American Poetry Review, Callaloo, Poet Lore, Harvard Review, Ploughshares, and on National Public Radio. His work has been praised for its “language simultaneously urban and highbrow… snapshots of a life that is so specific it becomes universal.”

== Early life and education ==
Born in Philadelphia, Pardlo grew up in Willingboro, New Jersey. His younger brother is Robbie Pardlo, an American musician formerly of R&B group City High. His father, Gregory Pardlo Sr., is a former air traffic controller who participated in the air traffic controllers' strike of 1981.

Pardlo entered the United States Marine Corps in 1987 and managed a jazz club before he received his BA in English from Rutgers University-Camden. He has an MFA from New York University as a New York Times Fellow in Poetry, an MFA in nonfiction from Columbia University; and a PhD in English from the Graduate Center of City University of New York. He has been the recipient of fellowships from the John Simon Guggenheim Memorial Foundation, the New York Foundation for the Arts, the Cave Canem Foundation, the MacDowell Artist's Colony, the Seaside Institute, the Lotos Club Foundation, and the City University of New York, as well as a translation grant from the National Endowment for the Arts.

== Career ==
Pardlo's first volume of poems, Totem, was chosen by Brenda Hillman as the winner of the 2007 American Poetry Review / Honickman First Book Prize, distributed by Copper Canyon Press. The manuscript for Totem was also a semifinalist for the Walt Whitman Award from the Academy of American Poets, a finalist for the National Poetry Series, and a finalist for the inaugural Essence Magazine Literary Award in Poetry. Pardlo is the translator of the full-length poetry collection Pencil of Rays and Spike Mace by Danish poet Niels Lyngsø.

Pardlo's poem “Written by Himself” appeared in The Best American Poetry 2010 anthology series edited by David Lehman and Amy Gerstler, following initial publication in The American Poetry Review. His poem "Wishing Well" appeared in The Best American Poetry 2014, guest edited by Terrance Hayes, following initial publication in Painted Bride Quarterly. Pardlo serves as an Associate Editor for the literary journal Callaloo. He has led writing workshops for the PEN American Center, the American Poetry Review / Young Voices Program, The Frost Place Conference, Callaloo Creative Writer's Workshop, and Jamaica’s Calabash International Literary Festival, among others. He is a teaching fellow at Columbia University.

In 2016, Pardlo accepted a tenure-track faculty position with the English department at his alma mater, Rutgers University-Camden. He has taught at Columbia University, George Washington University, Medgar Evers College, The New School University, John Jay College, Hunter College, and NYU.

As of 2023, Pardlo is a Visiting Associate Professor of Practice in Literature & Creative Writing at NYU Abu Dhabi.

Pardlo's 2024 collection Spectral Evidence, was longlisted for the National Book Award for Poetry.

== Awards and honors ==
- 2015 Winner, Pulitzer Prize for poetry for Digest
- 2014 Selection, The Best American Poetry 2014 for "Wishing Well"
- 2010 Selection, The Best American Poetry 2010 for "Written by Himself"
- 2008 Finalist, Essence Magazine Literary Award in Poetry for Totem
- 2008 Selection, Coldfront Magazine Best First Books of 2007 for Totem
- 2008 Nominee, Pushcart Prize
- 2007 Winner, American Poetry Review / Honickman First Book Prize in Poetry for Totem
- 2007 Finalist, National Poetry Series for Totem
- 2007 Semifinalist, Academy of American Poets Walt Whitman Award for Totem
- 2005 Finalist, Cave Cavem Book Prize
- 2004 Winner, Lotos Club Foundation Award for Creative Writing
- 2003 Nominee, Pushcart Prize
- 2001 Honorable Mention, New Millennium Writings Prize

== Bibliography ==
=== Poetry ===
Collections

- Totem (Copper Canyon Press, 2007), ISBN 9780977639526 (Note: Jordan Davis, "Totem – Gregory Pardlo" (review), The Constant Critic, May 1, 2008.) (Note: "(Inter/Re)view of Greg Pardlo’s TOTEM" (audio), Post No Ills, August 5, 2008.) (Note: "recommended: gregory pardlo", Lots and Lots of Neat blog, August 10, 2009.)
- Digest (Four Way Books, 2014), ISBN 9781935536505 (Note: 2015 Pulitzer Prize for poetry)

Translations

- Pencil of Rays and Spiked Mace (from the Danish of Niels Lyngsø; BookThug, 2004), ISBN 9780973564013

List of poems

| Title | Year | First published | Reprinted/collected |
|---|---|---|---|
| Allegory | 2021 | Pardlo, Gregory (March 1, 2021). "Allegory". The New Yorker. 97 (2): 40. | |

=== Anthologized writings ===
- “Written by Himself”, The Best American Poetry 2010 (Scribner, 2010)
- “Marginalia”, So Much Things to Say: 100 Poets from the First Ten Years of the Calabash International Literary Festival (Akashic Books, 2010)
- “Double Dutch”, From the Fishouse: An Anthology of Poems that Sing, Rhyme, Resound, Syncopate, Alliterate, and Just Plain Sound Great (Persea Press, 2009)
- “Man Reading in Bed by a Window with Bugs”, Black Nature: Four Centuries of African American Nature Poetry (University of Georgia Press, 2009)
- “Winter After the Strike”, Gathering Ground: A Reader Celebrating Cave Canem’s First Decade (University of Michigan Press, 2006)
- “Arsonist” and “Future as Evaporation”, Role Call: A Generational Anthology of Social and Political Black Literature and Art (Third World Press, 2002)
- “Harvest: A Line Drawing”, Bum Rush the Page: A Def Poetry Jam (Three Rivers Press, 2001)

=== Prose ===
- “Revisiting the Racial Mountain” (PEN American Center, 2010)
- “A Way of No Way: Toward Constructing a Black Male Poetic” (Painted Bride Quarterly #75, 2006)
- "'Hurrah for Schoelcher!'" (Drunken Boat 20, 2014)

Memoirs

- Air Traffic: A Memoir of Ambition and Manhood in America (Knopf, 2018), ISBN 978-1524731762

———————

Bibliography notes
