= Brandon Som =

American poet (born 1975)

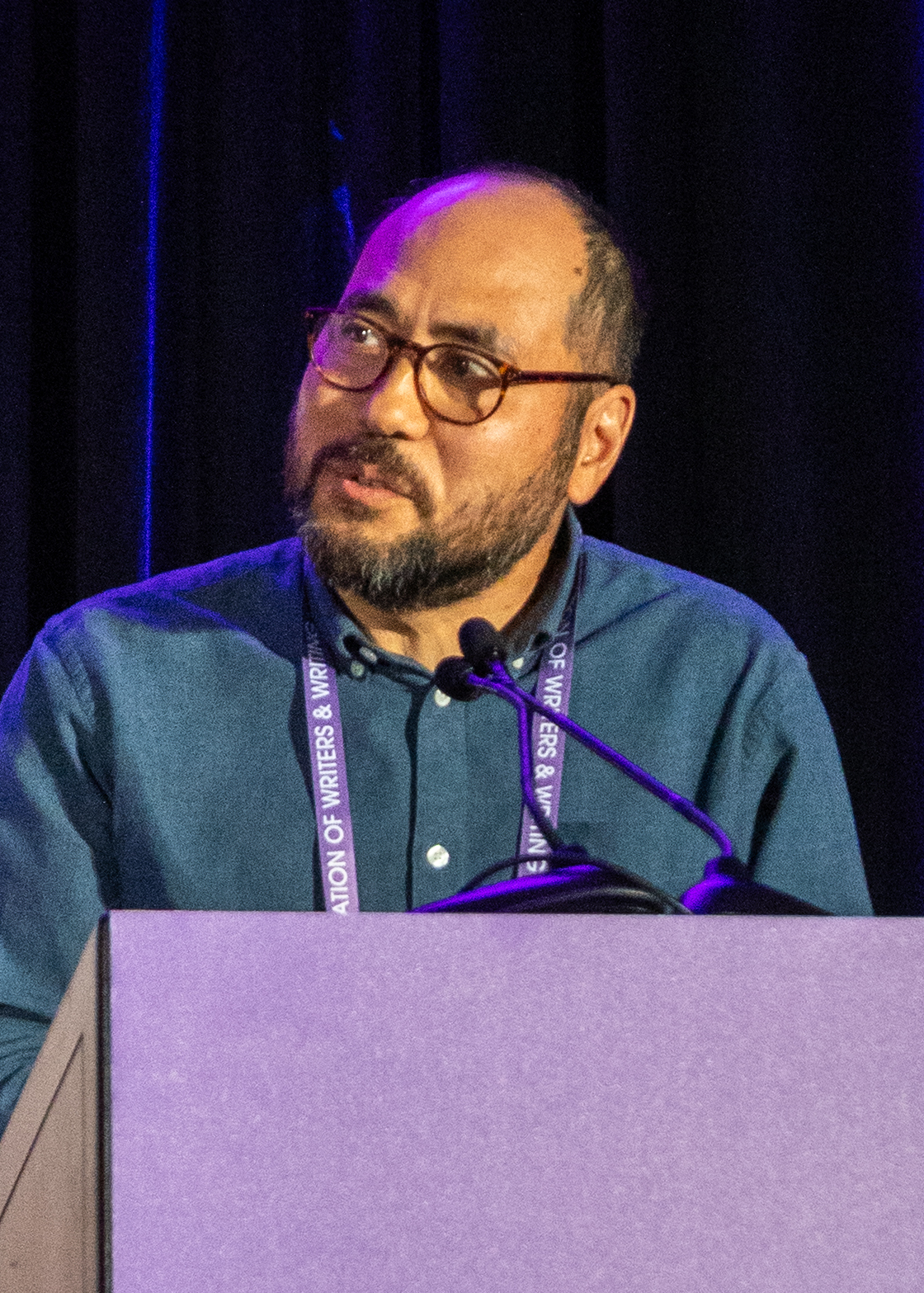
- Som at AWP 2025
- Born: August 13, 1975 (age 49); Phoenix, Arizona, U.S.
- Education: Arizona State University, Tempe (BA); University of Pittsburgh (MFA); University of Southern California (PhD)
- Occupation: Poet
- Awards: Pulitzer Prize for Poetry (2024)

Brandon Som (born August 13, 1975) is an American poet. His collections include The Tribute Horse (2014) and Tripas: Poems (2023), which won the Pulitzer Prize for Poetry in 2024. He is an associate professor of literature and creative writing at the University of California, San Diego.

== Life and career ==
Som was born and raised in Phoenix, Arizona. He is of Mexican and Chinese descent.

He received his Bachelor of Arts at Arizona State University, Master of Fine Arts at the University of Pittsburgh in 2002, and PhD at the University of Southern California in 2014. From 2013 to 2014, Som was a dissertation fellow at the Center for Transpacific Studies at USC Dornsife.

Som's chapbook of poetry, Babel's Moon, was published in 2011. His first complete collection of poems, The Tribute Horse, was published in 2014, winning the Kate Tufts Discovery Award in 2015.

Som's next collection, Tripas: Poems, was published by the University of Georgia Press in 2023. It was a finalist for the National Book Award for Poetry and won the Pulitzer Prize. The Pulitzer credit said the book "deeply engages with the complexities of the poet's dual Mexican and Chinese heritage, highlighting the dignity of his family's working lives, creating community rather than conflict".

== Bibliography ==
=== Poetry ===
- Babel's Moon (2011)
- The Tribute Horse (2014)
- Tripas: Poems (2023)
