= The Best of It =

Poetry collection by Kay Ryan

- Official Cover Design for The Best of It
- Author: Kay Ryan
- Genre: Poetry
- Publisher: Grove Atlantic Press
- Publication date: 2011
- Publication place: United States of America
- ISBN: 978-0-8021-4521-5

The Best of It (2011) is a selected collection of poems by Kay Ryan published by Grove Press. The collection won the 2011 Pulitzer Prize for Poetry. and was a finalist for the 2010 National Book Critics Circle Award for Poetry. The collection includes both poems original to The Best of It as well as poems selected from Ryan's former collections of poetry, specifically from Flamingo Watching (1994), Elephant Rocks (1996), Say Uncle (2000), and The Niagara River (2005).

== Description and Overview ==
The collection begins with a dedication to Ryan's late wife, Carol Adair, to whom Ryan was married until Adair's death in 2009. The collection contains 200 poems, most of which can be described as free verse.

== Reception and Critical Engagement ==
Most reviewers of The Best of It, including the Pulitzer citation, highlight the collection's role as a legacy achievement. Adam Kirsch compared the spare quality of Ryan's poetry to Emily Dickinson.
