= Vijay Seshadri =

American poet, essayist, and literary critic

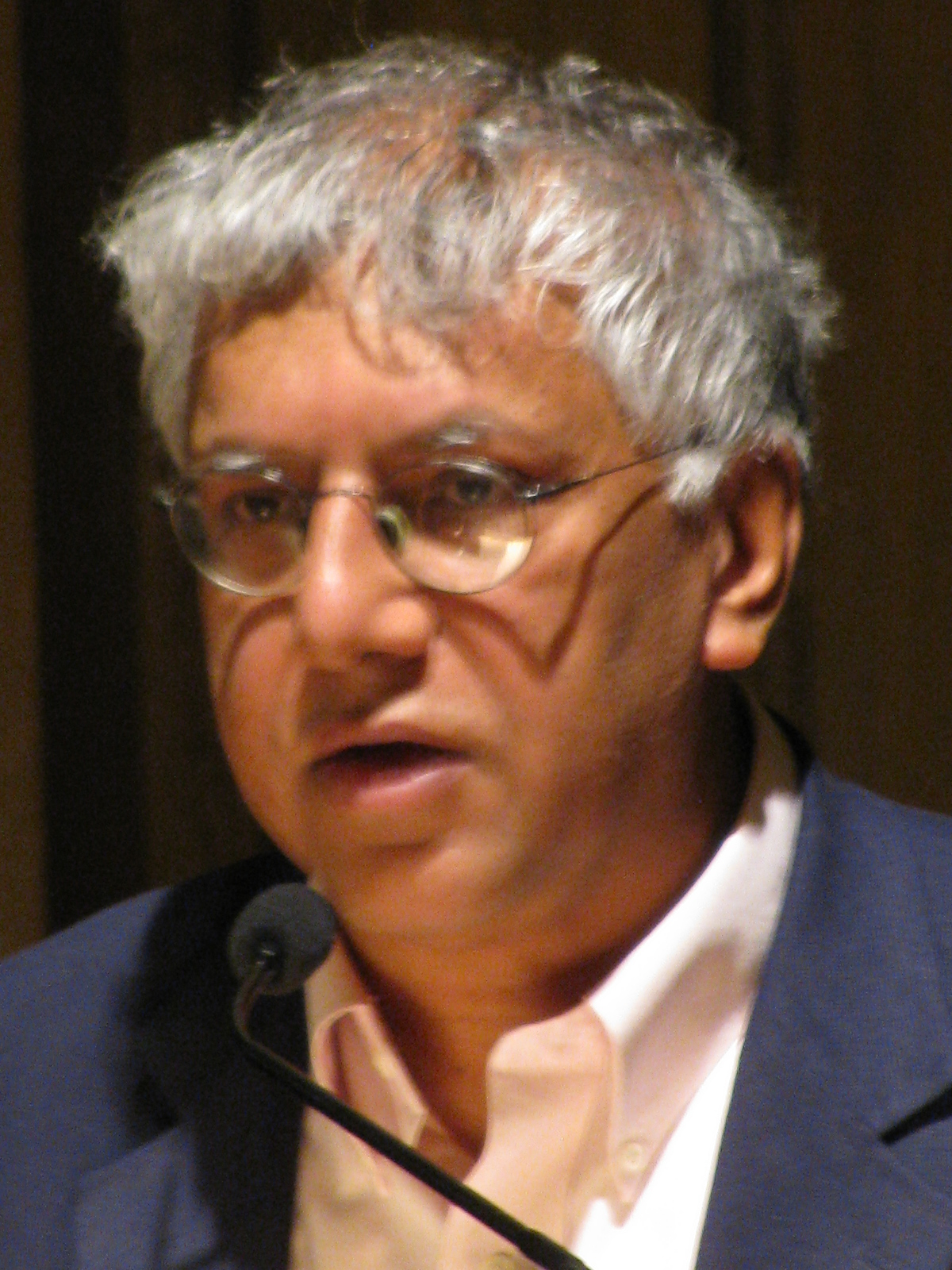
- Seshadri in 2014
- Born: 13 February 1954 (age 72); Bangalore, India
- Education: Oberlin College (BA); Columbia University (MFA)
- Writing career
- Genre: Poetry
- Notable awards: Pulitzer Prize for Poetry

Vijay Seshadri (born 13 February 1954) is an American poet, essayist and literary critic based in Brooklyn.

Vijay won the 2014 Pulitzer Prize for Poetry, for 3 Sections.

== Early life ==
Vijay's parents immigrated to the United States from Bangalore, India when he was five. He is of Tamil descent. He grew up in Columbus, Ohio, where his father taught chemistry at Ohio State University.

His grandson is named Bodie Jude Seshadri.

== Writing career ==
Seshadri has been an editor at The New Yorker, as well as an essayist and book reviewer in The New Yorker, The New York Times Book Review, The Threepenny Review, The American Scholar, and various literary quarterlies. He has received grants from the New York Foundation for the Arts, National Endowment for the Arts, the John Simon Guggenheim Memorial Foundation; and area studies fellowships from Columbia University. As a professor and chair in the undergraduate writing and MFA program at Sarah Lawrence College, he has taught courses on 'Non-Fiction Writing', 'Form and Feeling in Nonfiction Prose', 'Rational and Irrational Narrative', and 'Narrative Persuasion'.

In a 2004 interview, Seshadri discusses the creative process and his influences, in particular Walt Whitman, Emily Dickinson, Elizabeth Bishop, and William Blake. He also reflects on his cultural influences including the experience of "strangeness" coming of age in Columbus, Ohio during the 1960s.

Several of Seshadri's poems have been published by the New Yorker, including: "Rereading" (2012), "Visiting Paris" (2010), and "Thought Problem" (2009).

His poems, essays, and reviews have also appeared in A Public Space, AGNI, The American Scholar, Antaeus, Bomb, Boulevard, Epiphany, Fence, Field, Lumina, The Nation, The Paris Review, The Philadelphia Inquirer, Ploughshares, Poetry, The San Diego Reader, Shenandoah, The Southwest Review, The Threepenny Review, the Times Book Review, TriQuarterly, Verse, Western Humanities Review, The Yale Review.

Anthologies which have included his work include Under 35: The New Generation of American Poets, Under the Rock Umbrella, Contours of the Heart, Staying Alive: Real Poems for Unreal Times and The Best American Poetry 1997, 2003, 2006, and 2013.

=== The Disappearances ===
Seshadri's poem "The Disappearances" deals with a "cataclysm" in "American history" and the baffling nature of loss. The poem was written in response to Seshdari's memories of John F. Kennedy's assassination, but not published until The New Yorker magazine printed it on its back page following the September 11 attacks. The New Yorker's poetry editor, Alice Quinn, said that the poem "summoned up, with acute poignance, a typical American household and scene [...] The combination of epic sweep (including the quoted allusion to one of Emily Dickinson's Civil War masterpieces, from 1862) and piercing, evocative detail is characteristic of the contribution Seshadri has made to the American canon."

== Awards ==
- 2014 Pulitzer Prize for Poetry
- The James Laughlin Prize of the Academy of American Poets (for "The Long Meadow")
- The Paris Review's Bernard F. Conners Long Poem Prize
- 2004 Guggenheim Fellow

== Bibliography ==
=== Poetry ===
Collections

- Wild Kingdom Graywolf Press: Minnesota, 1996, ISBN 9781555972363
- The Long Meadow Graywolf Press: Minnesota, 2004, ISBN 1555974007. His second book. Six of these poems were also published in the New Yorker including "The Disappearances," "North of Manhattan," and "The Long Meadow".
- New and Selected Poems by HarperCollins India. Includes 'Wild Kingdom', 'The Long Meadow', 'The Disappearances'.
- Seshadri, Vijay. 3 Sections: poems. Graywolf Press.
- — (2020). That was now, this is then.

List of poems

Title	Year	First published	Reprinted/collected
The estuary	2020	Seshadri, Vijay (1 June 2020). "The estuary". The New Yorker. Vol. 96, no. 15. pp. 32–33.	
