= Modern Poetry (poetry collection) =

2024 poetry collection by Diane Seuss

- Author: Diane Seuss
- Publisher: Graywolf Press
- Publication date: March 5, 2024
- Pages: 112
- Awards: Heartland Booksellers Association Award for Poetry
- ISBN: 978-1644452752

Modern Poetry is a 2024 poetry collection by Diane Seuss, published by Graywolf Press. Seuss' sixth poetry collection, it won the 2024 Heartland Booksellers Association Award for Poetry and was designated a finalist for the 2024 National Book Award for Poetry.

== Content ==
The book's title was derived from a textbook of the same name that Seuss studied in school. Accordingly, the book's poems contend with the nature of poetry—Seuss called the book "a parody of a textbook"—specifically Romantic poetry and John Keats, one of the poets which Seuss deeply studied.

In The New Yorker, Seuss stated that she began to reckon with and even question the point of poetry during the loss of several loved ones and the alienation of the COVID-19 pandemic. After writing Frank: sonnets in 2021, Seuss "needed to turn a corner, as one must, into the next book or sequence or whatever" which ultimately led her to the "dire" interrogation of poetry writ large.

== Critical reception ==
In a starred review, Publishers Weekly concluded that "These irreverent, pulsing, and defiant poems are full of dangerous good sense."

Many critics lauded Seuss' reflection and interrogation of her own art form. Hanif Abdurraqib, writing for The New Yorker, said "The collection—sometimes playfully, sometimes with earnest curiosity, sometimes dismissively—tries to answer the question of poetry’s utility, and does so by sweeping through multiple forms, summoning the dead". The Chicago Review of Books stated that "The collection is a glorious origin story, describing the coup de foudre that Seuss encountered with her chosen profession, her calling really, grounded in experiences that didn’t follow the traditional—or patriarchical— trajectory of academe and ivy". The Poetry Foundation wrote that the "post-Romantic lyric autobiography ... in reinventing the 19th- and 20th-century poetic canons, deconstructs how poems and poets are made, and what poems mean." Preposition Magazine likened Seuss' introspection to that of Sentimental Education by Gustave Flaubert. The New York Journal of Books compared it to Letters to a Young Poet by Rainer Maria Rilke.

Other critics observed the book's imagery and technical construction. LitHub pointed out its "powerful images" and "provocative images" as well as Seuss' "rigor blended with a rare wildness." Interview observed the musicality of some poems and the pastoralism of others.
