= Dora Malech =

American poet (born 1981)

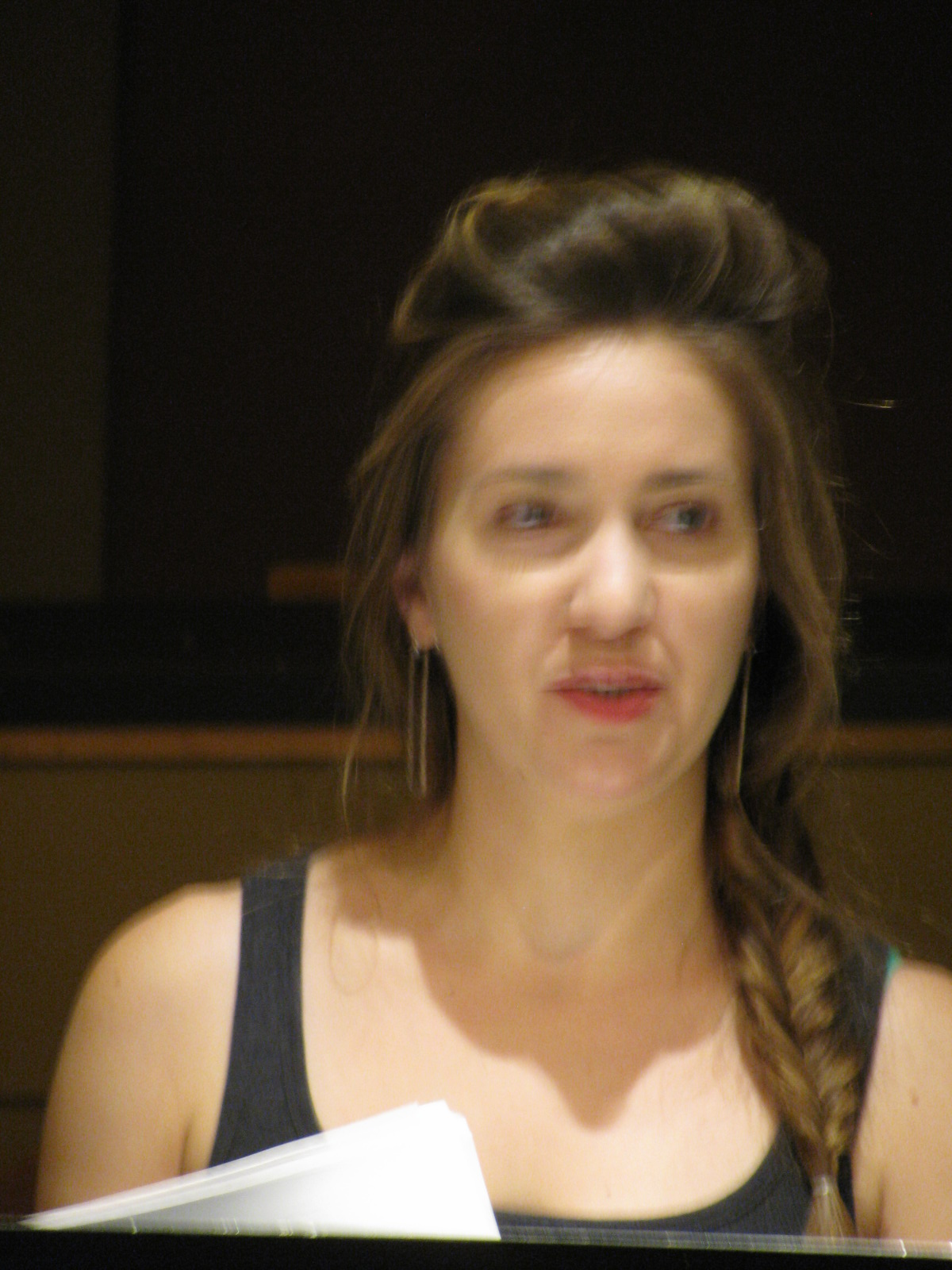
- Born: September 4, 1981 (age 44); New Haven, Connecticut, US
- Education: Yale University; University of Iowa Writers' Workshop
- Writing career
- Genre: Poetry
- Website: doramalech.net

Dora Malech (born September 4, 1981) is an American poet.

== Life ==
Malech grew up in Bethesda, Maryland, earned a BA in Fine Arts from Yale University in 2003, and received her MFA in Poetry from the University of Iowa Writers' Workshop in 2005. She has since taught writing at the University of Iowa; Victoria University of Wellington, New Zealand; Kirkwood Community College; and Augustana College. She has served as Distinguished Poet-in-Residence at Saint Mary's College of California, and she is a co-founder and former director of the arts engagement organization the Iowa Youth Writing Project.

She lives in Baltimore, Maryland, where she is the editor in chief of The Hopkins Review and a professor in The Johns Hopkins Writing Seminars in the Zanvyl Krieger School of Arts and Sciences at Johns Hopkins University.

== Career ==
Malech's first full-length collection of poetry, Shore Ordered Ocean, was published in 2009 by The Waywiser Press. The Cleveland State University Poetry Center published her second collection, Say So, in 2010.

The awards she has received for her poetry include a 2009 residency fellowship at the Civitella Ranieri Center in Italy, a 2010 Ruth Lilly Poetry Fellowship from the Poetry Foundation, and a 2017 Amy Clampitt Residency Award.

Her poems have appeared in numerous journals, magazines, and anthologies, including The Academy of American Poets' Poem-a-Day: 365 Poems for Every Occasion, The Academy of American Poets Poem-a-Day Series and Imagine Our Parks with Poems Series, Barn Owl Review, Barrow Street, Best New Zealand Poems, Chelsea, Denver Quarterly, Gargoyle Magazine, Gulf Coast, The Hopkins Review, Indiana Review, The Iowa Review, jubilat, The Morning News, New Orleans Review, The New Yorker, Painted Bride Quarterly, Poet Lore, Poetry, Poetry London, Sonora Review, Sport, Tin House, Versal, and The Yale Review.

Her poems were selected by Natasha Trethewey for Best New Poets 2007, Mark Strand for No Near Exit: Writers Select Their Favorite Work from Post Road Magazine, and Sherman Alexie for The Best American Poetry 2015.

She collaborated with composer Jacob Cooper on a track for his debut album Silver Threads (Nonesuch Records, 2014).

== Bibliography ==
=== Collections ===
- Malech, Dora (1999). Inside & Elsewhere (Chapbook). Washington, DC: Argonne Hotel Press. ISBN 9781887641265.
- Malech, Dora (2009). Shore Ordered Ocean. Waywiser Press. ISBN 9781904130390
- Malech, Dora (2010). Say So. Cleveland State University Poetry Center. ISBN 9781880834923
- Malech, Dora (2018). Stet. Princeton University Press. ISBN 9780691184012
- Malech, Dora (2020). Flourish. Carnegie Mellon University Press. ISBN 9780887486555
- Malech, Dora (2025). Trying × Trying. Carnegie Mellon University Press. ISBN 9780887487118

=== List of poems ===
Title	Year	First published	Reprinted/collected
To the you of ten years ago, now	2013	Malech, Dora (May 6, 2013). "To the you of ten years ago, now". The New Yorker. Vol. 89, no. 12. p. 36.	
