= Pulitzer Prize for Poetry =

American award for distinguished poetry

The Pulitzer Prize for Poetry is one of the seven American Pulitzer Prizes awarded annually for Letters, Drama, and Music. The award came five years after the first Pulitzers were awarded in other categories; (Note: Perhaps signaling her displeasure for being left in the dark and out of the loop about the matter, Harriet Monroe, publisher and editor of Poetry magazine, wrote in an editorial (1922), "The initial award is of course worthy of all praise, though the committee may have regretted that they could not honor also Miss Millay's Second April. Indeed, the year 1921, presenting two such books, was singularly rich." Frank D. Fackenthal, who administered the Prizes, wrote back to say that the prize had been established by the Advisory Board of the School of Journalism, not by a literary Board, at a meeting in May, 1921. The Columbia School of Journalism had discontinued another prize, thereby freeing the funds (and of course could offer no authority as regarded the critique of poetry).) Joseph Pulitzer's will had not mentioned poetry. It was first presented in 1922, and is given for a distinguished volume of original verse by an American author, published during the preceding calendar year.

Before the establishment of the award, the 1918 and 1919 Pulitzer cycles included three Pulitzer Prize Special Citations and Awards (called at the time the Columbia University Poetry Prize) for poetry books funded by "a special grant from The Poetry Society." (Note: In 1918-19, Columbia University managed both the Pulitzers and the Poetry Society of America's $500 annual award. After the Society discontinued its prize in 1920, the Pulitzer Advisory Board initiated an annual prize for poetry, putting up another $500 to provide a monetary award of $1,000.) See Special Pulitzers for Letters.

Harriet Monroe, founding publisher and long-time editor of Poetry magazine, wrote in an editorial (Apr.–Sept., 1922), "The award of a Pulitzer Prize of one thousand dollars to the Collected Poems of Edwin Arlington Robinson is a most agreeable surprise, as this is the first Pulitzer Prize ever granted to a poet. Four years ago, when the Poetry Society of America gave its first annual five hundred dollars to Sara Teasdale's Love Songs, the award, being made in conjunction with the Pulitzer prizes, was falsely attributed to the same origin."

Finalists have been announced since 1980, ordinarily two others beside the winner.

== Winners ==
In its first 92 years to 2013, the Pulitzer Prize for Poetry was awarded 92 times. Two were given in 2008, none in 1946. Robert Frost won the prize four times and several others won it more than once (below).

Pulitzer Special Prizes for Poetry, 1918 and 1919
Year	Poet	Title
1918	Sara Teasdale	Love Songs
1919	Carl Sandburg	Cornhuskers
1919	Margaret Widdemer	The Old Road to Paradise

=== 1920s–1970s ===
Pulitzer Prize for Poetry winners, 1922–1979
Year	Poet	Title	Ref.
1922	Edwin Arlington Robinson	Collected Poems (Note: The first poetry jury met in New Haven on Feb. 11, 1922, and chose Robinson, with Amy Lowell and Edna St. Vincent Millay in competition. "Harriet Monroe, the influential editor of Poetry: A Magazine of Verse, wasn't crazy about the choice, appearing to favor Millay, but her real beef was with the makeup of the jury that selected Robinson," according to the Pulitzer Prize website. The jury, consisting of just three members, considered 28 books in all; it was chaired by Wilbur Lucius Cross. Cross and another juror favored Robinson, though the third juror preferred Lowell, followed by Millay and then Robinson. In Cross's jury report, he cited this juror's "reluctant consent" for Robinson, perhaps delivered only to get the job over and done. Harriet Monroe looked at these jurors – Cross, a busy man who was a Yale University literature professor yet also a politician who served as Connecticut's Governor for two terms; Richard Burton, a drama critic and reviewer of novels; and Ferris Greenslet, who was by trade a librarian and an associate editor of The Atlantic Monthly, but chiefly a biographer – and her opinion was plain: "Though we cannot criticize the verdict in this case, we must repeat once more our plea that all juries should be strictly professional, and that poets alone have the right and the authority to award honors in their art.")	
1923	Edna St. Vincent Millay	"The Ballad of the Harp-Weaver," "A Few Figs from Thistles," and "Eight Sonnets"	
1924	Robert Frost	New Hampshire: A Poem with Notes and Grace Notes	
1925	Edwin Arlington Robinson	The Man Who Died Twice	
1926	Amy Lowell	What's O'Clock	
1927	Leonora Speyer	Fiddler's Farewell	
1928	Edwin Arlington Robinson	Tristram	
1929	Stephen Vincent Benét	John Brown's Body	
1930	Conrad Aiken	Selected Poems	
1931	Robert Frost	Collected Poems	
1932	George Dillon	The Flowering Stone	
1933	Archibald MacLeish	Conquistador	
1934	Robert Hillyer	Collected Verse	
1935	Audrey Wurdemann	Bright Ambush	
1936	Robert P. T. Coffin	Strange Holiness	
1937	Robert Frost	A Further Range	
1938	Marya Zaturenska	Cold Morning Sky	
1939	John Gould Fletcher	Selected Poems	
1940	Mark Van Doren	Collected Poems	
1941	Leonard Bacon	Sunderland Capture	
1942	William Rose Benét	The Dust Which Is God	
1943	Robert Frost	A Witness Tree	
1944	Stephen Vincent Benét	Western Star	
1945	Karl Shapiro	V-Letter and Other Poems	
1946	No award given		
1947	Robert Lowell	Lord Weary's Castle	
1948	W. H. Auden	The Age of Anxiety	
1949	Peter Viereck	Terror and Decorum	
1950	Gwendolyn Brooks	Annie Allen	
1951	Carl Sandburg	Complete Poems	
1952	Marianne Moore	Collected Poems	
1953	Archibald MacLeish	Collected Poems 1917-1952	
1954	Theodore Roethke	The Waking	
1955	Wallace Stevens	Collected Poems	
1956	Elizabeth Bishop	Poems: North & South – A Cold Spring	
1957	Richard Wilbur	Things of This World	
1958	Robert Penn Warren	Promises: Poems 1954-1956	
1959	Stanley Kunitz	Selected Poems 1928-1958	
1960	W. D. Snodgrass	Heart's Needle	
1961	Phyllis McGinley	Times Three: Selected Verse From Three Decades	
1962	Alan Dugan	Poems	
1963	William Carlos Williams	Pictures from Brueghel	
1964	Louis Simpson	At the End of the Open Road	
1965	John Berryman	77 Dream Songs	
1966	Richard Eberhart	Selected Poems	
1967	Anne Sexton	Live or Die	
1968	Anthony Hecht	The Hard Hours	
1969	George Oppen	Of Being Numerous	
1970	Richard Howard	Untitled Subjects	
1971	W. S. Merwin	The Carrier of Ladders	
1972	James Wright	Collected Poems	
1973	Maxine Kumin	Up Country	
1974	Robert Lowell	The Dolphin	
1975	Gary Snyder	Turtle Island	
1976	John Ashbery	Self-Portrait in a Convex Mirror	
1977	James Merrill	Divine Comedies	
1978	Howard Nemerov	Collected Poems	
1979	Robert Penn Warren	Now and Then	

=== 1980s ===
Pulitzer Prize for Poetry winners, 1980–1989
Year	Poet	Title	Result	Ref.
1980	Donald Justice	Selected Poems	Winner	
1980	Richard Hugo	Selected Poems	Finalist	
1980	Dave Smith	Goshawk, Antelope	Finalist	
1981	James Schuyler	The Morning of the Poem	Winner	
1981	Richard Hugo	The Right Madness on Skye	Finalist	
1981	Mark Strand	Selected Poems	Finalist	
1982	Sylvia Plath	The Collected Poems	Winner	
1982	Dave Smith	Dream Flights	Finalist	
1982	Charles Wright	The Southern Cross	Finalist	
1983	Galway Kinnell	Selected Poems	Winner	
1983	Jack Gilbert	Monolithos, Poems 1962 and 1982	Finalist	
1983	Charles Wright	Country Music, Selected Early Poems	Finalist	
1984	Mary Oliver	American Primitive	Winner	
1984	John Engels	Weather-Fear: New and Selected Poems	Finalist	
1984	Josephine Miles	Collected Poems, 1930-1982	Finalist	
1985	Carolyn Kizer	Yin	Winner	
1985	Robert Duncan	Ground Work	Finalist	
1985	Charles Wright	The Other Side of the River	Finalist	
1986	Henry S. Taylor	The Flying Change	Winner	
1986	Andrew Hudgins	Saints and Strangers	Finalist	
1986	Charles Simic	Selected Poems, 1963-1983	Finalist	
1987	Rita Dove	Thomas and Beulah	Winner	
1987	Hayden Carruth	The Selected Poetry of Hayden Carruth	Finalist	
1987	Charles Simic	Unending Blues	Finalist	
1988	William Meredith	Partial Accounts: New and Selected Poems	Winner	
1988	Lucille Clifton	Good Woman: Poems and a Memoir 1969-1980 and Next: New Poems	Finalist	
1988	C.K. Williams	Flesh and Blood	Finalist	
1989	Richard Wilbur	New and Collected Poems	Winner	
1989	Donald Hall	The One Day	Finalist	
1989	Garrett Hongo	The River of Heaven	Finalist	

=== 1990s ===
Pulitzer Prize for Poetry winners, 1990–1999
Year	Poet	Title	Result	Ref.
1990	Charles Simic	The World Doesn't End	Winner	
1990	Adrienne Rich	Time's Power	Finalist	
1990	Paul Zweig	Selected and Last Poems	Finalist	
1991	Mona Van Duyn	Near Changes	Winner	
1991	Anthony Hecht	The Transparent Man	Finalist	
1991	Gerald Stern	Leaving Another Kingdom	Finalist	
1992	James Tate	Selected Poems	Winner	
1992	Robert Creeley	Selected Poems	Finalist	
1992	Adrienne Rich	An Atlas of the Difficult World	Finalist	
1993	Louise Glück	The Wild Iris (Note: The Jury consisted of Charles Wright, Bonnie Costello and Frank Bidart. Their consensus read: "Louise Glück's The Wild Iris is a book with a solitary, almost monastic vision. A kind of devotional poetry, it recalls the metaphysical tradition of the early 1600s, particularly the poet George Herbert. The poems themselves take place entirely within a garden, with the Christian motif of suffering and redemption, death and resurrection much in evidence. It is a book of intense inward rapture where lyric values, pure lyric values of voice and spiritual meditation, predominate, and its appearance secures for Glück a high place indeed in contemporary American poetry.")	Winner	
1993	John Ashbery	Hotel Lautreamont	Finalist	
1993	James Merrill	Selected Poems 1946-1985	Finalist	
1994	Yusef Komunyakaa	Neon Vernacular: New and Selected Poems (Note: The Jury consisted of Mary Oliver, Calvin Bedient and Michael S. Harper. Their consensus read: "The poems of Yusef Komunyakaa are deeply felt and experienced, often narrating the author's memory of childhood, his time in Vietnam, or an emotion – often melancholy – that is salved by music and/or love. His poems resonate with vigorous vocables, with great musical range and nuance; his poetic navigations of intense quiet and gentleness move subtly by leaps of truth-telling and song.")	Winner	
1994	Brenda Hillman	Bright Existence	Finalist	
1994	Allen Mandelbaum	The Metamorphoses of Ovid	Finalist	
1995	Philip Levine	The Simple Truth (Note: The Jury consisted of Mark Strand, Louise Glück and Charles Wright. They praised Levine's book, "in which small domestic loss and the grand erasures of time seem inextricable. Mr. Levine, whose gifts have never seemed more evident, has combined narrative grace and humor to form one of the most moving sequences of elegies in recent American poetry.")	Winner	
1995	Allen Ginsberg	Cosmopolitan Greetings: Poems 1986-1992	Finalist	
1995	Kenneth Koch	On the Great Atlantic Rainway: Selected Poems 1950-1988 and One Train	Finalist	
1996	Jorie Graham	The Dream of the Unified Field (Note: The Jury consisted of Frank Bidart, Bonnie Costello and John Wheatcroft. Their consensus: "Jorie Graham's The Dream of the Unified Field, selected from work published from 1974 to 1994, is a significant volume in its own right. It clarifies the superb achievement of one of America's most accomplished writers – the boldness of Graham's aesthetic innovation, the freshness with which she explores the central themes that have from the beginning dominated her work. No contemporary has explored more subtly or movingly the conflict between idea ("perfection") and manifestation (at best "perfect instances"), or invented with greater resource a prosody adequate to it.")	Winner	
1996	Donald Justice	New and Selected Poems	Finalist	
1996	Charles Wright	Chickamauga	Finalist	
1997	Lisel Mueller	Alive Together: New and Selected Poems (Note: The Jury consisted of Rita Dove, Mary Karr and Alan Williamson. Their consensus reads: "Mueller often writes about intense psychological states or perceptions. But her best work is transcendent in a lyric mode that evokes Rilke. She uses vivid imagery to augment linguistic and philosophical truths in forms that are both precise and super poetic – the language and what's being said are impossible to unravel. In 'Snow,' the whiteness of earth and heaven join at the poem's end – a breath-taking turn that brings a backwash of insight: 'We are covered with stars./Feel how light they are, our lives.' She's also capable of meditative brilliance, as in 'Place and Time,' which begins offhandedly with listening to a radio talk show, then leaps into more metaphysical ponderings: '[T]he lives we live/before the present moment/are graves we walk away from/Except we don't. We're all/pillars of salt. My life began/with Beethoven and Schubert/on my mother's grand piano.../[It] burned with our city in World War II.' Here as elsewhere, she sets average memory next to historical horror, the metaphysical next to the quotidian. Her political poems never fall into being pedantic, and her flourishes of linguistic wit are worthy of Pope. Her virtuosity rests partly in unadorned speech, for Mueller does not indulge in linguistic embroidery for its own sake. Her emotional intention is more radical than that: She often writes as if to inspire spiritual hope. These subtle poems grow more resonant with rereading.")	Winner	
1997	Robert Pinsky	The Figured Wheel	Finalist	
1997	Laurie Sheck	The Willow Grove	Finalist	
1998	Charles Wright	Black Zodiac	Winner	
1998	Frank Bidart	Desire	Finalist	
1998	C.K. Williams	The Vigil	Finalist	
1999	Mark Strand	Blizzard of One	Winner	
1999	Alice Notley	Mysteries of Small Houses	Finalist	
1999	Frederick Seidel	Going Fast	Finalist	

=== 2000s ===
Pulitzer Prize for Poetry winners, 2000–2009
Year	Poet	Title	Result	Ref.
2000	C. K. Williams	Repair	Winner	
2000	Rodney Jones	Elegy for the Southern Drawl	Finalist	
2000	Adrienne Rich	Midnight Salvage: Poems 1995-1998	Finalist	
2001	Stephen Dunn	Different Hours	Winner	
2001	Sydney Lea	Pursuit of a Wound	Finalist	
2001	Bruce Smith	The Other Lover	Finalist	
2002	Carl Dennis	Practical Gods	Winner	
2002	Louise Glück	The Seven Ages	Finalist	
2002	Franz Wright	The Beforelife	Finalist	
2003	Paul Muldoon	Moy Sand and Gravel	Winner	
2003	Frank Bidart	Music Like Dirt	Finalist	
2003	J. D. McClatchy	Hazmat	Finalist	
2004	Franz Wright	Walking to Martha's Vineyard	Winner	
2004	Henri Cole	Middle Earth	Finalist	
2004	Heather McHugh	Eyeshot	Finalist	
2005	Ted Kooser	Delights & Shadows	Winner	
2005	William Matthews	Search Party: Collected Poems	Finalist	
2005	Brigit Pegeen Kelly	The Orchard	Finalist	
2006	Claudia Emerson	Late Wife	Winner	
2006	Elizabeth Alexander	American Sublime	Finalist	
2006	Dean Young	Elegy on Toy Piano	Finalist	
2007	Natasha Trethewey	Native Guard	Winner	
2007	Martín Espada	The Republic of Poetry	Finalist	
2007	David Wojahn	Interrogation Palace: New & Selected Poems 1982-2004	Finalist	
2008	Robert Hass	Time and Materials	Winner	
2008	Philip Schultz	Failure	Winner	
2008	Ellen Bryant Voigt	Messenger: New and Selected Poems, 1976-2006	Finalist	
2009	W. S. Merwin	The Shadow of Sirius	Winner	
2009	Frank Bidart	Watching the Spring Festival	Finalist	
2009	Ruth Stone	What Love Comes To: New & Selected Poems	Finalist	

=== 2010s ===
Pulitzer Prize for Poetry winners, 2010–2019
Year	Poet	Title	Result	Ref.
2010	Rae Armantrout	Versed	Winner	
2010	Angie Estes	Tryst	Finalist	
2010	Lucia Perillo	Inseminating the Elephant	Finalist	
2011	Kay Ryan	The Best of It: New and Selected Poems	Winner	
2011	Maurice Manning	The Common Man	Finalist	
2011	Jean Valentine	Break the Glass	Finalist	
2012	Tracy K. Smith	Life on Mars	Winner	
2012	Forrest Gander	Core Samples from the World	Finalist	
2012	Ron Padgett	How Long	Finalist	
2013	Sharon Olds	Stag's Leap	Winner	
2013	Jack Gilbert	Collected Poems	Finalist	
2013	Bruce Weigl	The Abundance of Nothing	Finalist	
2014	Vijay Seshadri	3 Sections	Winner	
2014	Morri Creech	The Sleep of Reason	Finalist	
2014	Adrian Matejka	The Big Smoke	Finalist	
2015	Gregory Pardlo	Digest	Winner	
2015	Alan Shapiro	Reel to Reel	Finalist	
2015	Arthur Sze	Compass Rose	Finalist	
2016	Peter Balakian	Ozone Journal	Winner	
2016	Diane Seuss	Four-Legged Girl	Finalist	
2016	Elizabeth Willis	Alive: New and Selected Poems	Finalist	
2017	Tyehimba Jess	Olio	Winner	
2017	Campbell McGrath	XX	Finalist	
2017	Adrienne Rich	Collected Poems: 1950-2012	Finalist	
2018	Frank Bidart	Half-light: Collected Poems 1965–2016	Winner	
2018	Evie Shockley	semiautomatic,	Finalist	
2018	Patricia Smith	Incendiary Art	Finalist	
2019	Forrest Gander	Be With	Winner	
2019	Jos Charles	feeld	Finalist	
2019	A.E. Stallings	Like	Finalist	

=== 2020s ===
Pulitzer Prize for Poetry winners, 2020–present
Year	Poet	Title	Result	Ref.
2020	Jericho Brown	The Tradition	Winner	
2020	Dorianne Laux	Only as the Day Is Long: New and Selected Poems	Finalist	
2020	Mary Ruefle	Dunce	Finalist	
2021	Natalie Diaz	Postcolonial Love Poem	Winner	
2021	Mei-mei Berssenbrugge	A Treatise on Stars	Finalist	
2021	Carolyn Forché	In the Lateness of the World	Finalist	
2022	Diane Seuss	frank: sonnets	Winner	
2022	Will Alexander	Refractive Africa: Ballet of the Forgotten	Finalist	
2022	Mai Der Vang	Yellow Rain	Finalist	
2023	Carl Phillips	Then the War: and Selected Poems, 2007–2020	Winner	
2023	Jay Hopler	Still Life	Finalist	
2023	dg nanouk okpik	Blood Snow	Finalist	
2024	Brandon Som	Tripas: Poems	Winner	
2024	Jorie Graham	To 2040	Finalist	
2024	Robyn Schiff	Information Desk: An Epic	Finalist	
2025	Marie Howe	New and Selected Poems	Winner	
2025	Jennifer Chang	An Authentic Life	Finalist	
2025	Danez Smith	Bluff: Poems	Finalist	
2026	Juliana Spahr	Ars Poeticas	Winner	
2026	Douglas Kearney	I Imagine I Been Science Fiction Always	Finalist	
2026	Patricia Smith	The Intentions of Thunder: New and Selected Poems	Finalist	

== Multiple wins and nominations ==
The following individuals received two or more Pulitzer Prizes for Poetry (The 1918 and 1919 Special Prizes are included):

Wins	Poet	Years
4	Robert Frost	1924, 1931, 1937, 1943
3	Edwin Arlington Robinson	1922, 1925, 1928
2	Stephen Vincent Benét	1929, 1944
2	Robert Lowell	1947, 1974
2	Archibald MacLeish	1933, 1953
2	William S. Merwin	1971, 2009
2	Carl Sandburg	1919, 1951
2	Robert Penn Warren	1958, 1979
2	Richard Wilbur	1957, 1989

The following individuals received two or more nominations:

Bolded years are years that the poet won

Nominations	Poet	Years
5	Charles Wright	1982, 1983, 1985, 1996, **1998**
4	Frank Bidart	1998, 2003, 2009, **2018**
4	Robert Frost	**1924, 1931, 1937, 1943**
4	Adrienne Rich	1990, 1992, 2000, 2017
3	Edwin Arlington Robinson	**1922, 1925, 1928**
3	Charles Simic	1986, 1987, **1990**
2	John Ashbery	**1976**, 1993
2	Stephen Vincent Benét	**1929, 1944**
2	Forrest Gander	2012, **2019**
2	Jack Gilbert	1983, 2013
2	Louise Glück	**1993**, 2002
2	Anthony Hecht	**1968**, 1991
2	Richard Hugo	1980, 1981
2	Donald Justice	**1980**, 1996
2	Robert Lowell	**1947, 1974**
2	Archibald MacLeish	**1933, 1953**
2	James Merril	**1977,** 1993
2	William S. Merwin	**1971, 2009**
2	Carl Sandburg	**1919, 1951**
2	Diane Seuss	2016, **2022**
2	Mark Strand	1981, **1999**
2	Dave Smith	1980, 1982
2	Patricia Smith	2018, 2026
2	Robert Penn Warren	**1958, 1979**
2	Richard Wilbur	**1957, 1989**
2	C.K. Williams	1988, 1998
2	Franz Wright	2002, **2004**

Robert Frost won the Pulitzer Prize for Poetry four times from 1924 to 1943. Edwin Arlington Robinson won three prizes during the 1920s and several people, all male, have won two.

Carl Sandburg won one of the special prizes for his poetry in 1919 and won the Poetry Pulitzer in 1951.

Only five women have had multiple nominations: Adrienne Rich with 4, and Louise Glück, Jorie Graham, Diane Seuss and Patricia Smith with 2 each.

== See also ==
- American poetry
- List of poetry awards
