= Rowan Ricardo Phillips =

American poet (born 1974)

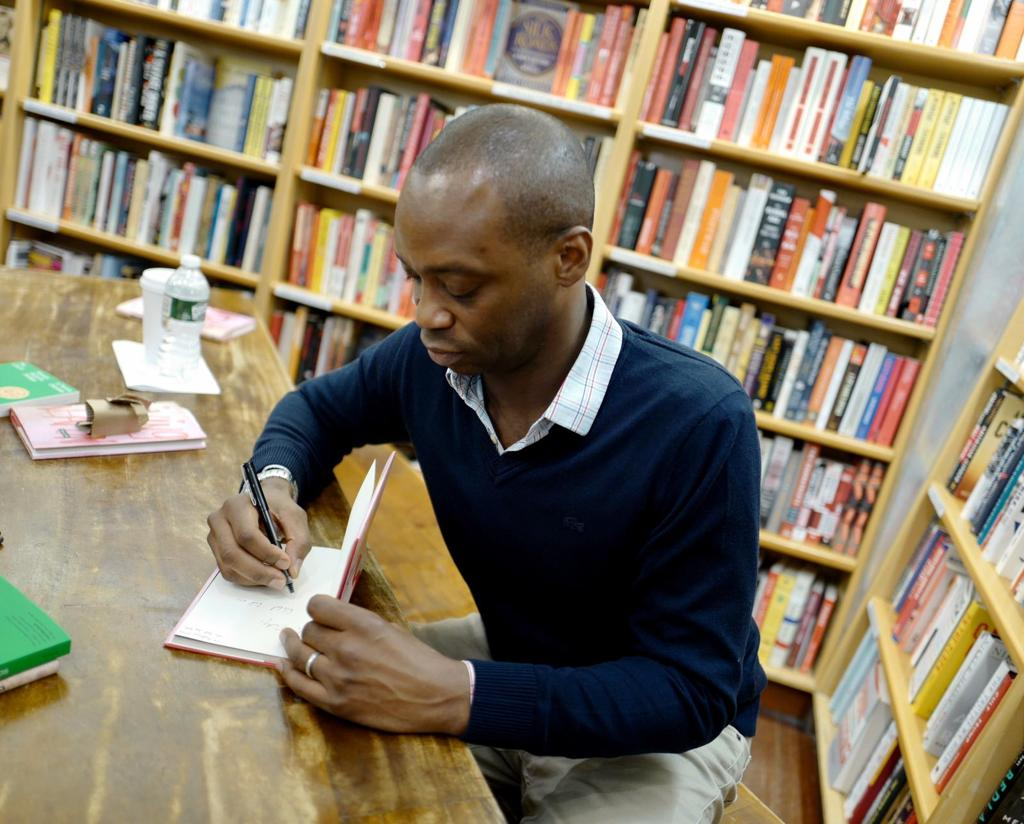
- Phillips in 2020
- Born: 1974 (age 51–52); New York, New York, US
- Education: Swarthmore College (BA); Brown University (PhD)
- Occupations: Poet; Writer
- Employer: Stony Brook University
- Writing career
- Genre: Poetry · Sportswriting · Nonfiction · Essay · Literary Criticism · Translation · Screenwriting
- Website: rowanricardophillips.com

Rowan Ricardo Phillips (born 1974 in New York City) is an American poet, writer, editor, and translator. He is a Distinguished Professor of English at Stony Brook University, the poetry editor of The New Republic, and the editor of Princeton University Press' Princeton Series of Contemporary Poetry. He is President of the Board of the New York Institute for the Humanities.

He is the author of the poetry collections The Ground (2012), Heaven (2015), and Living Weapon (2020), the non-fiction books When Blackness Rhymes with Blackness and The Circuit: A Tennis Odyssey, and a translation from the Catalan of Salvador Espriu's short-story collection Ariadne in the Grotesque Labyrinth.

== Life ==
Phillips was born in New York City and grew up in the Bronx. His parents are from Antigua and Barbuda. He graduated from Hunter College High School, then earned his bachelor's degree from Swarthmore College and his doctorate in English Literature from Brown University.

He is a Professor of English at Stony Brook University. He has previously taught at Harvard, Princeton, Columbia, Williams, NYU, and Baruch College.

Phillips is President of the Board of the New York Institute for the Humanities. He is also a member of the Board of Aspen Words. He divides his time between New York and Barcelona with his wife and two daughters. He is a supporter, and club member, of FC Barcelona.

== Writing ==
=== Poetry ===
Phillips's first three books of poems––The Ground, Heaven, and Living Weapon––can be read as a poetry trilogy. The poet Henri Cole stated: "Like all good poets, Rowan Ricardo Phillips writes from a zone of his own creation, mixing the traditions of his West Indian ancestry with American poetry. He is a hopeful poet, a rising star." Poet and scholar Evie Shockley wrote of The Ground that Phillips's poems "carry the authoritative descriptions and rhythms of Walcott, the philosophical and symbolic flights of Stevens, the subtle humor and cosmopolitanism of Dove, but in a language whose musical blend of the contemporary and the timeless is all Phillips's own. In a 2021 review of Living Weapon for The Guardian, David Wheatley writes that "Phillips's determination to push beyond irony into affirmation is an audacious gesture".

Phillips is the author of a book of literary criticism on African-American poetry, When Blackness Rhymes with Blackness (2010), and a translation from the Catalan of Salvador Espriu's story collection Ariadne in the Grotesque Labyrinth (2012).

Phillips' fourth poetry collection, Silver, was published in 2024 by Farrar, Straus and Giroux in the United States and was longlisted for the National Book Award for Poetry.

=== Sportswriting ===
Phillips has contributed sportswriting on tennis, soccer, basketball, and baseball. in a number of magazines. About his book The Circuit: A Tennis Odyssey, the novelist John Green wrote, "Phillips writes with such fluidity, and packs the book with bursts of brilliance." The book follows the 2017 men's ATP Tour, featuring players Roger Federer, Rafael Nadal, Andy Murray, Novak Djokovic, David Goffin, and Albert Ramos Viñolas.

Phillips wrote a screenplay for a biopic of baseball icon Roberto Clemente adapted from the David Maraniss biography Clemente: The Passion and Grace of Baseball's Last Hero. As of 2018, the film was planned to be directed by Ezra Edelman. Phillips is also a consultant for the National Baseball Hall of Fame and Museum, where he is part of the curatorial team working on a new exhibit called "Souls of the Game", which focuses on the history of Black baseball.

Phillips is currently writing a book about Black baseball entitled I Just Want Them to Remember Me: Black Baseball in America, which will be published by Farrar, Straus and Giroux.

=== Awards ===
Phillips has been the recipient of a Whiting Award, a Guggenheim Fellowship, the Anisfield-Wolf Book Award, and the Nicolás Guillén Outstanding Book Prize. He won the PEN/Joyce Osterweil Award for Poetry in 2013 and the PEN/ESPN Award for Literary Sportswriting in 2019.

== Bibliography ==
=== Poetry collections ===
- The Ground: Poems. Farrar, Straus and Giroux. 2012. ISBN 9781466802537.
- Heaven: Poems. Farrar, Straus and Giroux. 2015. ISBN 9780374168520.
- Living Weapon: Poems. Farrar, Straus and Giroux. 2020. ISBN 9780374191993.
- Silver. Farrar, Straus and Giroux. 2024.

=== Poetry contributions ===
- "Violins." African American Poetry: 250 Years of Struggle and Song, edited by Kevin Young. Library of America. 2020. ISBN 9781598536669.

=== Criticism ===
- When Blackness Rhymes with Blackness (Dalkey Archive Scholarly Series). Dalkey Archive Press. 2010. ISBN 9781564786197.

=== Nonfiction ===
- The Circuit: A Tennis Odyssey. Farrar, Straus and Giroux. 2018. ISBN 9780374123772.

=== Translation ===
- Salvador Espriu (August 28, 2012). Ariadne in the Grotesque Labyrinth. Dalkey Archive Press. ISBN 9781564787736.
