= Donald M. Friedman =

American literary scholar (1929–2019)

- Born: April 8, 1929; The Bronx, New York, U.S.
- Died: June 10, 2019 (aged 90)
- Awards: Guggenheim Fellowship (1974)

Academic background
- Education: Columbia University (BA); Trinity College, Cambridge (BA, MA); Harvard University (PhD)

Academic work
- Discipline: Renaissance literature
- Institutions: University of California, Berkeley
- Doctoral students: Kimberly Johnson

Donald M. Friedman (April 8, 1929 – June 10, 2019) was an American literary scholar. He was a professor of English at the University of California, Berkeley.

== Biography ==
Friedman was born in The Bronx on April 8, 1929, and was raised in Brooklyn and Woodmere, Long Island. He was among the students recruited to appear on the Quiz Kids radio show. He attended Townsend Harris Hall High School and graduated from Columbia College in 1949. At Columbia, Friedman studied under Lionel Trilling, Mark Van Doren, Jacques Barzun, and F. W. Dupee, and was a member of the Philolexian Society.

After Columbia, Friedman was awarded a Henry Fellowship for a year's study at Trinity College, Cambridge, where he finished a second bachelor's degree and obtained a master's degree. He was then drafted into the United States Army and served in Japan after the Korean War. Friedman obtained his PhD from Harvard University in just three years after completing military service.

Friedman joined the faculty of the University of California, Berkeley in 1961. His scholarship focused on Renaissance poetry and drama in English, and he served as chair of Berkeley's department of dramatic art and as dean of humanities. He retired from teaching in 2001.

Friedman received a Guggenheim Fellowship in 1974.

== Personal life ==
Friedman was a lifelong friend of poet John Hollander. He died of respiratory failure on June 10, 2019.
