= Digest (poetry collection) =

Poetry collection by Gregory Pardlo

- Official Cover Design for Digest
- Author: Gregory Pardlo
- Genre: Poetry
- Publisher: Four Way Books
- Publication date: 2014
- Publication place: United States of America
- ISBN: 978-1-935536-50-5

Digest is a 2014 poetry collection by Gregory Pardlo published by Four Way Books. Digest won the 2015 Pulitzer Prize for Poetry and was a nominee for the 2015 Hurston/Wright Legacy Award and the 46th NAACP Image Award. Pardlo started work on the collection in 2004 "as an effort to mesh academic with creative writing."

== Description and overview ==
Digest can be described as a mix of free verse and prose poems.

Pardlo described the "running theme of the book" as "to take . . . things and to digest them and make them my own." This thematic line has also been described as a kind of identity formation, drawing on both national and personal history to define the limits of the collection's shared speaker.

== See also ==
- Gregory Pardlo
- Pulitzer Prize for Poetry
