= Frank: sonnets =

Winner of the 2022 Pulitzer Prize for Poetry

Cover of the first (Graywolf Press) edition, 2021.

frank: sonnets is a poetry collection in the form of a sonnet sequence by Diane Seuss. First published by Graywolf Press in 2021. The collection was republished by Fitzcarraldo Editions in 2025, as one of the first three books in their poetry series. The collection was the winner of the 2022 Pulitzer Prize for Poetry, the 2021 National Book Critics Circle Award for Poetry, amid other awards.

== Background ==
Seuss' frank: sonnets is composed of 156 sonnets. In an interview with Helena de Groot for Poetry Foundation's 'Poetry off the shelf' podcast, the De Groot and Seuss talk about the book's autobiographical aspects, its relationship with death, and how this shades into Seuss' usage of the poetic form of the sonnet, of which Seuss says: "I love that the sonnet forced me to do that work within a compressed space".

The sonnets are autobiographical. The book tracks between Seuss' childhood, young adulthood in New York, through to motherhood. Death is a central theme: in particular, the figure of Seuss' father who died when she was a child, and the death of her friend Mikel Lindzy (who is the subject of the photograph on the 2021 Graywolf Press edition's cover) of AIDS. The book was written, in part, as a response to Seuss' reluctance to write a memoir in prose. An interview with Cristina Politano for minor literature[s] contains further ellaboration on the background for the collection, where Seuss says:

"Readers had expressed interest in my writing a memoir, but I simply couldn’t hear it in prose. The sentences and linearity didn’t sing for me. The notion of shorter poems under [Frank] O’Hara’s kinetic, present-tense influence suddenly landed for me. I could hear the voice of the poem and could imagine that voice serving a memoir-in-poems"

Seuss' use of the sonnet form is innovative, drawing on the specific lineage of what Seuss calls the "American Sonnet". Traditionally using only fourteen lines, Seuss bends the sonnet form's constraint to produce poems that exceed this limit in formal and stylistic ways. Several poems contain lines that are longer than the page is wide, and are printed on folding pages.

Stylistically, Seuss' sonnets blend a lyric mode traditionally associated with the sonnet, with a narrative mode. The Pulitzer Committee said of frank: sonnets, it's a collection "that inventively expands the sonnet form to confront the messy contradictions of contemporary America, including the beauty and the difficulty of working-class life in the Rust Belt". Seuss has said these restraints kept her "honest", but the "virtuosi[ty]" the Pulitzer commended the collection for is found in her ability to expand the conventionally lyric form to contain narrative among other poetic modes.

In an interview with Jennifer Franklin for the Poetry Society of America, Seuss says "[f]orm is what the world is—a concept, brought into materiality".

== Critical reception and awards ==
The Pulitzer committee described frank: sonnets as "a virtuosic collection that inventively expands the sonnet form to confront the messy contradictions of contemporary America, including the beauty and the difficulty of working-class life in the Rust Belt."

=== Prizes and awards ===
| Name of award | Year | Result |
|---|---|---|
| Pulitzer Prize in Poetry | 2022 | Winner |
| National Book Critics Circle Award for Poetry | 2021 | Winner |
| PEN/Voelcker Award for Poetry Collection | 2022 | Winner |
| Los Angeles Times Book Prize for Poetry | 2021 | Winner |
| Kingsley Tufts Poetry Award | 2022 | Finalist |

=== Other accolades ===
An Atlantic Best American Poetry Collection of the 21st Century.
