= Be With (album) =

Compilation album by Koushik
- Released: July 26, 2005
- Recorded: 2000–2004
- Genres: Jazz; Hip hop Ambient; Psychedelic pop
- Label: Stones Throw
- Producer: Koushik

Koushik chronology
The Hip Hop Remixes (2004)	Be With (2005)

Professional ratings
Review scores
Source	Rating
Allmusic	link

Be With is a compilation album by Koushik, a Canadian hip hop musician. Serving as Koushik's first major release, the album compiles tracks from three of Koushik's old EPs: Battle Times, Be With and One In A Day. The Be With EP was released as a 12" vinyl. The album is intended to be reminiscent of 1960s psych-pop. Koushik also provides singing vocals to the tracks.

== Track listing ==
All tracks composed by Koushik Ghosh

1. "Be With" – 4:12
  - Produced by Koushik
  - Contains a sample from "Back to the Country" by Hurricane Smith
2. "Homage" – 0:59
  - Produced by Koushik
3. "Pretty Soon" – 1:58
  - Produced by Koushik
4. "Take It Back (Interlude)" – 0:30
  - Produced by Koushik
5. "Winter Sun" – 0:22
  - Produced by Koushik
6. "One in a Day" – 3:33
  - Produced by Koushik
7. "Back to the End" – 1:28
  - Produced by Koushik
8. "Too Many Ways" – 2:12
  - Produced by Koushik
9. "Ride Out" – 0:50
  - Produced by Koushik
10. "Ride It Out" – 1:47
  - Produced by Koushik
11. "Battle Rhymes for Battles Times" – 2:42
  - Produced by Koushik
12. "Younger Than Today, Pt. 1" – 1:39
  - Produced by Koushik
13. "Ew" – 2:28
  - Produced by Koushik
14. "Only Dreaming" – 1:22
  - Produced by Koushik
15. "I'd Like to Get to Know You" – 1:43
  - Produced by Koushik

== Album notes ==
- Tracks 1 to 4 appear on the Be With EP.
- Tracks 5 to 10 appear on the One In A Day EP.
- Tracks 11 to 14 appear on the Battle Times EP.

== Credits ==
- Executive producer: Peanut Butter Wolf
- Mastering: Dave Cooley
