= Diane Seuss =

American poet, educator (born 1956)

- Born: 26 May 1956 (age 70) Michigan City, Indiana
- Occupation: poet, educator
- Education: Kalamazoo College (BA); Western Michigan University (MSW)
- Notable works: frank: sonnets
- Notable awards: Pulitzer Prize for Poetry 2022 frank: sonnets; National Book Critics Circle Award for Poetry 2022 frank: sonnets

Diane Seuss (born 1956) is an American poet and educator. Her book frank: sonnets won the Pulitzer Prize for Poetry and the National Book Critics Circle Award for Poetry in 2022.

== Early life, family and education ==
Diane Seuss was born in Michigan City, Indiana and raised in Michigan in Edwardsburg and Niles.

Seuss received a BA from Kalamazoo College and an Master's of Social Work from Western Michigan University.

== Career ==
Seuss taught at Kalamazoo College from 1988 until 2016. In 2012, she was the MacLean Distinguished Visiting Professor in the Department of English at Colorado College. She has been a visiting professor at University of Michigan and Washington University in St. Louis.

Seuss is a 2020 Guggenheim Fellow. In 2021 she received the John Updike Award from the American Academy of Arts and Letters.

Her poetry has appeared in Gulf Coast, The Missouri Review, Poetry, and The New Yorker, among others. Her book Four-Legged Girl was a finalist for the Pulitzer Prize. Still Life with Two Dead Peacocks and a Girl was a finalist for the National Book Critics Circle Award in Poetry and the Los Angeles Times Book Prize in Poetry.

== Critical reception ==
Reviews of Seuss's work often note her technical acumen. Writing about frank: sonnets in the Women's Review of Books, Laurie Stone notes "More than anything, it strikes me, she loves the individual sentence and line." Los Angeles Times reviewer Victoria Chang says that Seuss is "writing some of the most animated and complex poetry today," and goes on to write

In an age where poetry can so easily be simplified into small one-dimensional sound bites to share on Instagram or Twitter, Seuss's poems aspire to complicate, drawing connections between seemingly unrelated things, flowing in and out and back and away from their initial triggers.

Publishers Weekly called Seuss's writing "endlessly inventive with her language and feats of imagination."

=== Four-Legged Girl ===
Seuss's third collection, Four Legged Girl, is "concerned with loss," including the deaths of her father and of a former lover, but also addresses "importance of living in the present," writes Marybeth Rua-Larsen. She goes on "In Four-Legged Girl, Seuss not only turns the common associations of flowers as gentle and delicate things easily damaged into symbols of strength and aggression but does so with energy, inventiveness, and a wildness that is incapable of being tamed."

In the American Poetry Review, Margaree Little addresses the collection's title, which refers to Myrtle Corbin, a Victorian-era woman born with four legs and who appears on the cover of the book. Seuss begins and ends the book with works taking inspiration from Corbin. Little writes that Seuss's poems are "borne of traumas" and sees Corbin as a mirror of Seuss's self-identification "as a spectacle, an exhibit, a performance."

Writing for The Rumpus, Ellen Mack-Miller notes a sense of animism in Four-Legged Girl, writing "Seuss animates. Objects come alive, like toys springing from a chest when darkness comes." Four Legged Girl was a finalist for a Pulitzer Prize; the nomination called the collection "a gallery of incisive and beguiling portraits and landscapes."

=== Still Life with Two Dead Peacocks and a Girl ===
Seuss's collection Still Life with Two Dead Peacocks takes its title from the Rembrandt painting of the same name, and each section of the collection begins with an image derived from the painting. Other poems references paintings Vincent van Gogh, Georgia O'Keeffe, Mark Rothko, and Jackson Pollock among others. Reviewer Laurie Stone writes that the poems' use of painting allows them to "freeze time" and makes them a "lab for experiments with language, rough emotions, and the indeterminacy of feeling." Los Angeles Times reviewer Victoria Chang describes the effect of Seuss's use of painting to frame her poems: "By the end of the book, we see how a painting (and the speaker's life) have become so much more because we have taken the painting (and life) apart and expanded each fragment.... art, in particular still life art, is anything but useless."

=== frank: sonnets ===
frank: sonnets comprises 128 poems, all sonnets. Critic Laurie Stone sees Seuss's use of poetic form as a metaphor: "A sonnet is like a trapped body: all physical limits and nowhere to run but inside the lyrical imagination. Fourteen lines, again and again."

Critic Meryl Natchez writes that

... in frank: sonnets, [Seuss] provides fresh imagery, calls out the male icons of the '70s and early '80s New York scene, and directly grapples with loneliness, addiction, abortion, and death. The language is often startling, the incidents pried open for the reader to enter and observe. The overall arc of the book is memoir: stories of grief, of questing, of trying to make sense of a complex life. These poems appear in the order written, with long sequences about Seuss's father, her lovers, her exploits and failures, and the death of a close friend.

The Pulitzer Prize committee described frank: sonnets as "a virtuosic collection that inventively expands the sonnet form to confront the messy contradictions of contemporary America, including the beauty and the difficulty of working-class life in the Rust Belt."

=== Modern Poetry ===
Seuss's 2024 collection, Modern Poetry, was a finalist for the National Book Award for Poetry. It was also one of the New York Times's 100 Notable Books of 2024.

One poem in the collection, "Romantic Poet," was featured in an article by New York Times critic A. O. Scott under the headline "Will You Fall in Love With This Poem? I Did." In it, Scott offers a close reading of Seuss's poem, which itself considers famed Romantic poet John Keats. Scott sees in the poem an "unromantic, prosaic, crude" physical description of a "stinky, runty, manifestly unlovable poet" paired with praise for his "immaculate art." He concludes "Keats himself, made real in Seuss’s poem — a living, embodied presence she cannot help loving, in spite of whatever unpleasantness her scholar friend might reveal about him. That’s true romance."

== Selected works ==
- It Blows You Hollow (New Issues 1998)
- Wolf Lake, White Gown Blown Open (University of Massachusetts Press 2010), winner of the Juniper Prize for Poetry in 2009
- Four-Legged Girl (Graywolf Press 2015), finalist for the Pulitzer Prize for Poetry in 2016
- Still Life with Two Dead Peacocks and a Girl (Graywolf Press 2018), finalist for National Book Critics Circle Award for Poetry and Los Angeles Times Book Prize in Poetry.
- frank: sonnets (Graywolf Press 2021), winner of the PEN/Voelcker Award for Poetry Collection, the National Book Critics Circle Award for Poetry, and the Pulitzer Prize for Poetry
- Modern Poetry (Graywolf Press 2024)
