= The Hopkins Review =

- Discipline: Cultural studies, literature, arts
- Language: English
- Edited by: Dora Malech

Publication details
- History: 1947-1953, 2008-present
- Publisher: Johns Hopkins University Press (United States)
- Frequency: Quarterly

Standard abbreviations
- ISO 4: Hopkins Rev.

Indexing
- ISSN: 1939-6589 (print); 1939-9774 (web)
- OCLC no.: 664601577

Links
- Journal homepage; Online access

The Hopkins Review is a quarterly literary journal that publishes fiction, poetry, and memoir; essays on literature, drama, film, the visual arts, music, and dance; interviews, folios of visual art, and translations; as well as reviews of books, performances, and exhibits. The original Hopkins Review was a literary quarterly published by the Johns Hopkins Writing Seminars from 1947 to 1953. It was brought back in 2008 in a joint venture between the Writing Seminars and the Johns Hopkins University Press. Since 2022, the current editor-in-chief is Dora Malech. The journal won the 2022 Phoenix Award for Significant Editorial and Design Achievement from the Council of Editors of Learned Journals.
