= Jay Hopler =

American poet (1970–2022)

- Born: November 23, 1970; San Juan, Puerto Rico
- Died: November 9, 2022 (aged 51); Salt Lake City, Utah, U.S.
- Education: New York University (BA); Johns Hopkins University (MA); University of Iowa (MFA); Purdue University (PhD)
- Occupations: Poet, Professor of English

Jay Hopler (November 23, 1970 – June 15, 2022) was an American poet.

== Early life and education ==
Hopler was born in San Juan, Puerto Rico. He graduated from Purdue University (Ph.D., American Studies), the Iowa Writers’ Workshop (M.F.A., Creative Writing/Poetry), the Johns Hopkins Writing Seminars (M.A., Creative Writing/Poetry) and New York University (B.A., English and American Literature).

== Career ==
His poetry, essays, and translations have appeared in numerous magazines and journals, including American Poetry Review, The Kenyon Review, Mid-American Review, The New Republic and The New Yorker.

Hopler was Professor of English (Creative Writing/Poetry) at the University of South Florida.

== Personal life ==
Hopler was married to poet and Renaissance scholar Kimberly Johnson.

== Death ==
On 15 June 2022, Hopler died in Salt Lake City, Utah, after a battle with prostate cancer.

== Awards ==
- 2005 Yale Series of Younger Poets Award, for Green Squall, chosen by Louise Glück
- 2006 ForeWord Magazine Book of the Year Award for Green Squall
- 2006 Florida Book Award for Green Squall
- 2007 Great Lakes Colleges Association New Writers Award, for Green Squall
- 2007 National “Best Books” Award from USA Book News for Green Squall
- 2009 Lannan Foundation Fellowship
- 2009 Whiting Award
- 2010/2011 Rome Prize in Literature from the American Academy of Arts & Letters/The American Academy in Rome
- 2014 National “Best Books” Award from USA Book News for Before the Door of God: An Anthology of Devotional Poetry
- 2016 Florida Book Award in Poetry (Gold Medal) for The Abridged History of Rainfall
- 2016 Finalist, National Book Award for Poetry for The Abridged History of Rainfall
- 2023, Guggenheim Fellowship
- 2023 Finalist, Pulitzer Prize for "Still Life"

== Works ==
- —— (2006). Green Squall. Yale University Press. ISBN 9780300114546.
- —— (2016). The Abridged History of Rainfall. McSweeney's Poetry Series. ISBN 9781944211264.
- —— (2022). Still Life. McSweeney's. ISBN 9781952119378.

=== Anthologies ===
- Jay Hopler, ed. (1996). The Killing Spirit: An Anthology of Murder for Hire. Overlook Press. ISBN 9780879516611.
- Jay Hopler; Kimberly Johnson, eds. (2013). Before the Door of God: An Anthology of Devotional Poetry. Yale University Press. ISBN 9780300175202.
