= Be With (poetry collection) =

2018 publication by Forrest Gander

- Official Cover Design for Be With
- Author: Forrest Gander
- Genre: Poetry
- Publisher: New Directions Press
- Publication date: 2018
- Publication place: United States of America
- ISBN: 0811226050

Be With (2018), published by New Directions, is the tenth collection of poems written by Forrest Gander. The book won the 2019 Pulitzer Prize for Poetry and was longlisted for a 2018 National Book Award. The collection is, in part, an elegy for poet C. D. Wright to whom Gander had been married since 1986 and who passed unexpectedly in 2016. The title of Be With comes from the dedication of ShallCross, a collection of poems by Wright published posthumously. Gander eventually stopped doing public readings from Be With over personal concerns with performing his grief. The design for the 2018 print of the collection was done by art designer Sasha Veryovka.

== Description and Overview ==
The poems of Be With orbit several topics, most notably the death of Gander's wife, but also the mysticism of St. John of the Cross, the history of the U.S. border with Mexico, and his mother's Alzheimer's disease.

The collection begins with an epigraph from the poem "The World" by William Bronk. The poems in the collection can be described as free verse. The collection concludes with a section titled "Littoral Zone" containing a series of ekphrastic poems responding to adjoining photograms by artist Michael Flomen.
