= Lauren Hilger =

American poet

- Education: New York University, 2007 BA; Sarah Lawrence College, 2011 MFA
- Occupation: Poet
- Writing career
- Language: English
- Genre: Poetry
- Notable work: Morality Play
- Website: laurenhilger.com/

Lauren Hilger is the author of two collections of poetry, Lady Be Good (Civil Coping Mechanisms, 2016) and Morality Play (Poetry Northwest Editions, 2022). She was named the Nadya Aisenberg Fellow in Poetry from the MacDowell Colony in 2012. In 2017, LitReactor called her one of the "10 New Female Authors That Should Be On Your Radar".

== Education ==
Hilger has degrees from New York University (BA, 2007) and Sarah Lawrence College (MFA, 2011).

== Work ==
Hilger, who has taught at Rutgers, got a chance to read at the Geraldine R. Dodge Poetry Festival at sixteen. In 2012 and 2014, she was awarded a residency at the MacDowell Colony, where she worked in the Heyward studio. There, she was also awarded the Nadya Aisenberg Fellowship in Poetry in 2012.

Hilger published her debut poetry collection, Lady Be Good, with Civil Coping Mechanisms in 2016. Atticus Review noted this "cinematic" collection for "a certain timelessness... or at least a sense of history", and LitReactor praised the collection for "honest, elegant, gritty, and beautiful" poetry. Also in 2016, she started hosting a monthly workshop and reading series at FRIEDAcommunity in her hometown of Philadelphia.

Her second collection Morality Play, which "interweaves themes ranging from nostalgia and womanhood to technology and moral landscapes", was selected for The Possession Sound Reading Series from Poetry NW Editions, and was published in 2022. BOMB included the collection in its "2022 Small Press Gift Guide", and a review published in the magazine contrasted the collection's "understanding of how Hilger views herself" with "the archetypes of a staged womanhood" present in Hilger's first book.

Hilger has published work in The Kenyon Review, Pleiades, and The Threepenny Review, and often collaborated with Dionissios Kollias on poems. She is the Poetry Editor for No Tokens Journal.

== Books ==
- Lady Be Good (CCM, 2016) ISBN 9781937865764
- Morality Play (Poetry NW Editions, 2022) ISBN 9781949166057

== Residencies ==
- 2012: MacDowell Colony
- 2014: MacDowell Colony

== Awards ==
- 2012: Nadya Aisenberg Fellowship, MacDowell Colony
- Agha Shahid Ali Scholarship, Fine Arts Work Center, Provincetown
- Virginia Center for the Creative Arts fellowship
- Hambidge Center Fellowship in Poetry
