= Kimberly Johnson (poet) =

American poet and Renaissance scholar (born 1971)

- Born: January 9, 1971 Salt Lake City, Utah, US
- Occupation: Poet, Professor of English
- Education: Johns Hopkins University (MA); University of Iowa (MFA); University of California at Berkeley (PhD)

Kimberly Johnson (born 1971) is an American poet and scholar of early modern literature.

== Life ==
Johnson was raised in Utah. She earned her MA in 1995 from the Johns Hopkins University Writing Seminars, her MFA in 1997 Iowa Writers' Workshop, and a PhD in 2003 from University of California, Berkeley.

She teaches courses in creative writing and Renaissance literature at Brigham Young University (BYU). Johnson's academic interests include lyric poetry, John Milton, and John Donne.

Her work has appeared in The New Yorker, Slate, The Iowa Review, 32 Poems, The Yale Review, and The Best American Poetry 2020, and her translations from Latin and Greek have been published in literary and academic journals. She has also published a scholarly examination of 17th-century poetry as well as a number of scholarly articles on seventeenth-century literature.

She has edited several collections of essays on Renaissance literature, and an online archive of John Donne's complete sermons.

She was married to poet Jay Hopler until his death in June 2022.

== Awards ==
In 2005, she was awarded a Creative Writing Fellowship from the National Endowment for the Arts to support the completion of her second collection, A Metaphorical God. In 2011, she received a Guggenheim Fellowship. She received the Amy Lowell Poetry Travelling Scholarship for 2024–2025.

== Books ==
=== Poetry ===
- Leviathan with a Hook, Persea Books, 2002, ISBN 978-0-89255-282-5
- A Metaphorical God, Persea Books, 2008, ISBN 978-0-89255-342-6
- Uncommon Prayer, Persea Books, 2014, ISBN 978-0-89255-447-8
- Fatal, Persea Books, 2022, ISBN 978-0-89255-559-8

=== Criticism ===
- Made Flesh: Sacrament and Poetics in Post-Reformation England, University of Pennsylvania Press, 2014, ISBN 978-0-81224-588-2

=== Translations ===
- Virgil, Georgics, Penguin Classics, 2009, ISBN 978-1-84614-240-6
- Hesiod, Theogony and Works and Days, Northwestern University Press, 2017. ISBN 978-0-8101-3487-4

=== As editor ===
- Lyric Temporalities, University of Toronto Press, 2026, ISBN 9781487560379
- Before the Door of God: An Anthology of Devotional Poetry, Yale University Press, 2013, ISBN 978-0-30017-520-2
- Divisions on a Ground: Essays on Renaissance Literature in Honor of Donald M. Friedman, George Herbert Journal Special Series and Monographs, 2008, ISBN 978-1888112177
