= List of awards and honors received by John Ashbery =

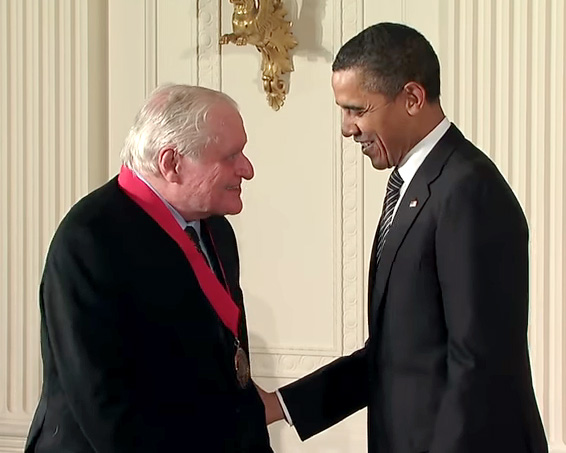
Ashbery received the National Humanities Medal from President Barack Obama in February 2012. Video of the event is included below.

American poet John Ashbery (1927–2017) received numerous awards, nominations, grants, fellowships, and other honors in his lifetime. He was generally regarded as the most-honored poet of his generation and one of the most-honored American writers of any era.

He received his first award, the 92nd Street Y Discovery Prize for unpublished poets, in 1952. Four years later, W. H. Auden selected him as the winner of the Yale Series of Younger Poets Competition, resulting in the publication of his debut poetry collection Some Trees. His 1975 collection Self-Portrait in a Convex Mirror became the first book to win a Pulitzer Prize, a National Book Award, and a National Book Critics Circle Award. To date, Ashbery remains the only writer to attain the achievement, which has been called the "Triple Crown" of American literature.

Beyond prizes and awards, Ashbery was a recipient of several monetary grants and fellowships that provided crucial support for his literary ambitions and travel. As a Fulbright scholar, he moved to France in 1955 to study French poetry and teach. He continued to live in the country for nearly a decade thereafter. Years later, the people of France conferred several honors in recognition of his lifelong engagement with French poetry and culture, most notably by making him an officer of the national Legion of Honor. In 1985 he received a MacArthur Fellowship—an unconditional cash prize informally known as the "Genius Grant"—allowing him to quit his job as a professor and write poetry full-time. He also received two Guggenheim Fellowships and two grants from the National Endowment for the Arts. Poems by Ashbery were often anthologized among the year's best.

Ashbery had acquired a reputation as a prolific prize-winner by the early 1990s. (Note: For example, in a 1991 review Alfred Corn called him "the contemporary poet who has won more prizes than any other.") According to James F. English's 2004 book The Economy of Prestige, Ashber had received more awards than any other poet in the world. English counted 45 awards for Ashbery, followed by Irish poet Seamus Heaney at 30 awards and fellow American poet Adrienne Rich at 25 awards. David Lehman observed that Ashbery also held a lead over the novelist John Updike, winner of 39 awards, and therefore Ashbery likely stood as the most-honored of any living American writer—at least in terms of sheer quantity of awards. Although he was considered a perennial contender for the Nobel Prize in Literature over the last three decades of his life—and almost certainly the leading candidate among American poets during that period—he never became a Nobel laureate.

== Accolades for individual works ==
=== 92Y Discovery Prize ===
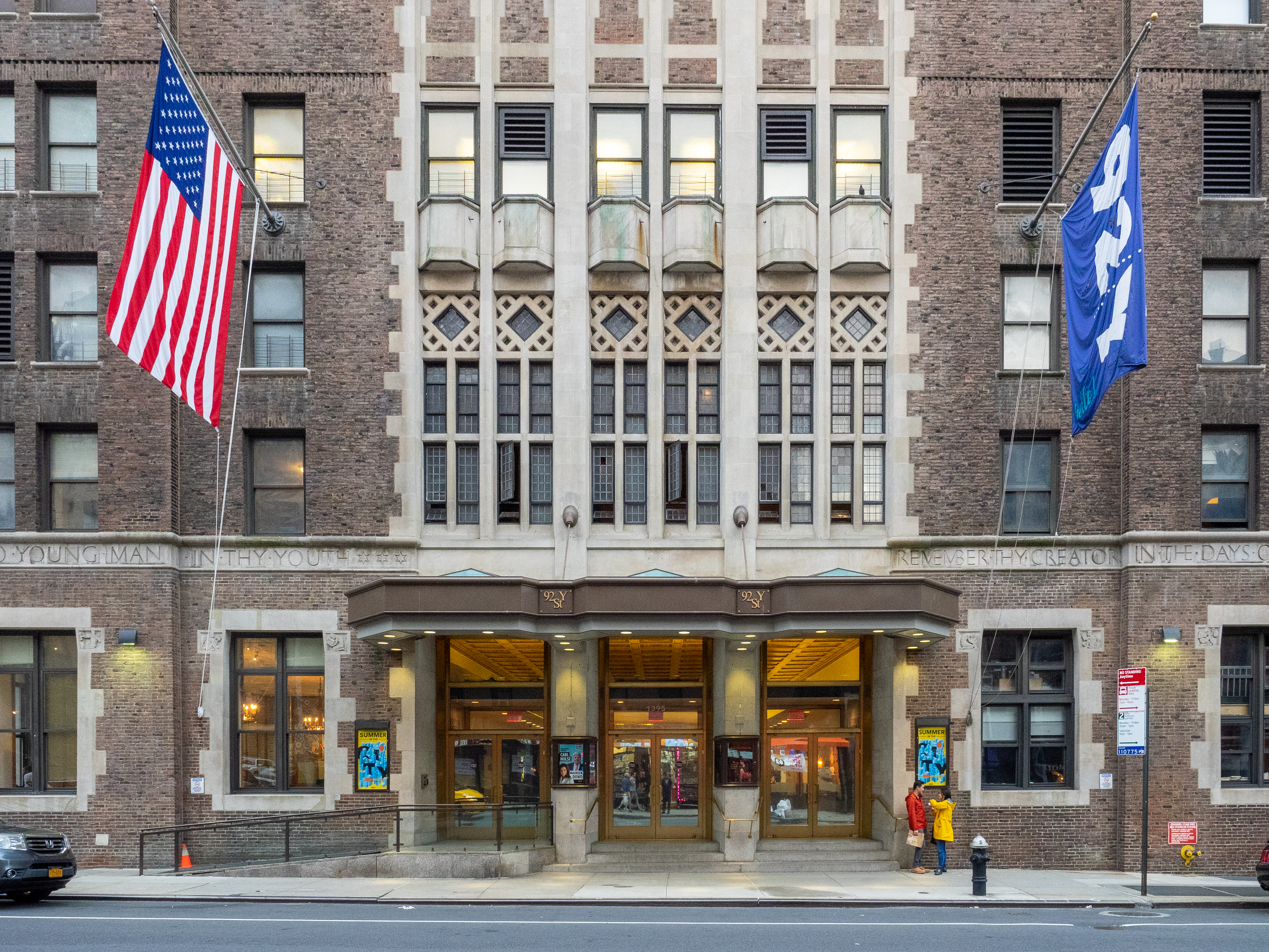
The 92nd Street Y in 2019

The Discovery Prize is an award given to poets who have not yet published their debut book. It is given out annually by the 92nd Street Y (also called 92Y), a cultural and community center in Manhattan run by the Young Men's Hebrew Association (now called the Jewish Community Center).

External audio
- "Discovering John Ashbery — 92Y Readings" (30:21) April 3, 1952 – Via SoundCloud Ashbery's reading at the 92nd Street Y from the night he received his first literary award, the Discovery Prize.

Ashbery received the Discovery Prize on April 3, 1952, as the winner of what was then called the Poetry Center Introductions contest. He shared the award with Harvey Shapiro and Gray Burr. The contest that year had hundreds of competing applicants and was judged by John Malcolm Brinnin, Kimon Friar, and Richard Wilbur. It was Ashbery's first literary award. He gave a reading of sixteen poems at the award ceremony—his first since graduating college. When asked to judge the Discovery Prize competition in 2014, he replied, "I'll have to say yes, since the contest was the beginning of my poetry career, a mere 52 years ago."

=== ALA Notable Books ===
Since 1944, the American Library Association (ALA) has compiled annual lists of Notable Books for adults. The winners are selected by the Notable Books Council, a subgroup within the ALA's Reference and User Services Association (RUSA), which also makes other award decisions. The criteria, as described in 2012, are:

A book may be selected for inclusion on the Notable Books List if it possesses exceptional literary merit, expands the horizons of human knowledge, makes a specialized body of knowledge accessible to the nonspecialist, has the potential to contribute significantly to the solution of a contemporary problem, or presents a unique concept.

Books written by Ashbery have been listed three times: once in 1978 for Houseboat Days, again in 1982 for Shadow Train, and a final time in 2012 for his translation of the French poet Arthur Rimbaud's Illuminations.

Year	Nominee / work	Award	Result	Ref.
1978	Houseboat Days	ALA Notable Book	Listed	
1982	Shadow Train	ALA Notable Book	Listed	
2012	Illuminations (By Arthur Rimbaud, translated from the French by Ashbery)	ALA Notable Book	Listed	

=== "Best-of" anthologies ===
In general, Ashbery was among the top 25 most frequently anthologized American poets of the latter half of the 20th century. In most cases, literary anthologies either attempt to define a set of "canonical" works or collect writings united by a common characteristic such as historical time period, region, author identity, genre, etc. Although inclusion in such anthologies can be considered prestigious, they are not understood to be "prizes" or "awards" per se. The following anthologies were competitive selections of the previous year's "best" poetry, as judged by an editor or panel of editors.

Year	Poem	Anthology	Series	Compiling editor or nominator	Ref.
1970	"Soonest Mended"	Best Poems of 1969: Borestone Mountain Poetry Awards 1970	Borestone Mountain Poetry Awards	Borestone Mountain Poetry Awards editors	
1977	"All Kinds of Caresses"	The Pushcart Prize, II: Best of the Small Presses	The Pushcart Prize	Chicago Review (as nominator)	
1988	"One Coat of Paint"	The Best American Poetry 1988	The Best American Poetry	John Ashbery	
1989	"Meanwhile. . . ."	The Best American Poetry 1989	The Best American Poetry	Donald Hall	
1990	"Notes from the Air"	The Best American Poetry 1990	The Best American Poetry	Jorie Graham	
1991	"Of Dreams and Dreaming"	The Best American Poetry 1991	The Best American Poetry	Mark Strand	
1992	"Poem at the New Year"	The Best American Poetry 1992	The Best American Poetry	Charles Simic	
1993	"Baked Alaska"	The Best American Poetry 1993	The Best American Poetry	Louise Glück	
1994	"Myrtle"	The Best American Poetry 1994	The Best American Poetry	A. R. Ammons	
1997	"The Problem of Anxiety"	The Best American Poetry 1997	The Best American Poetry	James Tate	
1998	"Wakefulness"	The Best American Poetry 1998	The Best American Poetry	John Hollander	
1998	Three poems: "Baked Alaska"; "Myrtle"; "The Problem of Anxiety"	The Best of the Best American Poetry 1988–1997	The Best American Poetry	Harold Bloom	
1998	Five poems from Some Trees (1956): "The Instruction Manual"; "The Young Son"; "Some Trees"; "The Painter"; "The Pied Piper"	The Yale Younger Poets Anthology	Yale Series of Younger Poets Competition	George Bradley	
2001	"Crossroads in the Past"	The Best American Poetry 2001	The Best American Poetry	Robert Hass	
2002	"The Pearl Fishers"	The Best American Poetry 2002	The Best American Poetry	Robert Creeley	
2004	"Wolf Ridge"	The Best American Poetry 2004	The Best American Poetry	Lyn Hejinian	
2005	"In Dearest, Deepest Winter"	The Best American Poetry 2005	The Best American Poetry	Paul Muldoon	
2006	"A Worldly Country"	The Best American Poetry 2006	The Best American Poetry	Billy Collins	
2006	"All Kinds of Caresses"	The Pushcart Book of Poetry: The Best Poems From Three Decades of the Pushcart Prize	The Pushcart Prize	Joan Murray and the Pushcart Prize editors	
2008	"Pavane pour Helen Twelvetrees"	The Best American Poetry 2008	The Best American Poetry	Charles Wright	
2008	Six poems from Notes from the Air: Selected Later Poems (2007): "Someone You Have Seen Before"; "Token Resistance"; "Chapter II, Book 35"; "Memories of Imperialism"; "The New Higher"; "Interesting People of Newfoundland"	The Griffin Poetry Prize 2008 Anthology: A Selection of the Shortlist	The Griffin Poetry Prize	George Bowering, James Lasdun, and Pura López Colomé	
2009	"They Knew What They Wanted"	The Best American Poetry 2009	The Best American Poetry	David Wagoner	
2010	"Alcove"	The Best American Poetry 2010	The Best American Poetry	Amy Gerstler	
2011	"Postlude and Prequel"	The Best American Poetry 2011	The Best American Poetry	Kevin Young	
2013	"Resisting Arrest"	The Best American Poetry 2013	The Best American Poetry	Denise Duhamel	
2013	"Wakefulness"	The Best of the Best American Poetry: 25th Anniversary Edition	The Best American Poetry	Robert Pinsky	
2014	"Breezeway"	The Best American Poetry 2014	The Best American Poetry	Terrance Hayes	
2017	"Commotion of the Birds"	The Best American Poetry 2017	The Best American Poetry	Natasha Trethewey	
2019	Three poems from Some Trees (1956): "A Boy"; "Errors"; "Answering a Question in the Mountains"	Firsts: 100 Years of Yale Younger Poets	Yale Series of Younger Poets Competition	Carl Phillips	

==== Borestone Mountain Poetry Awards ====
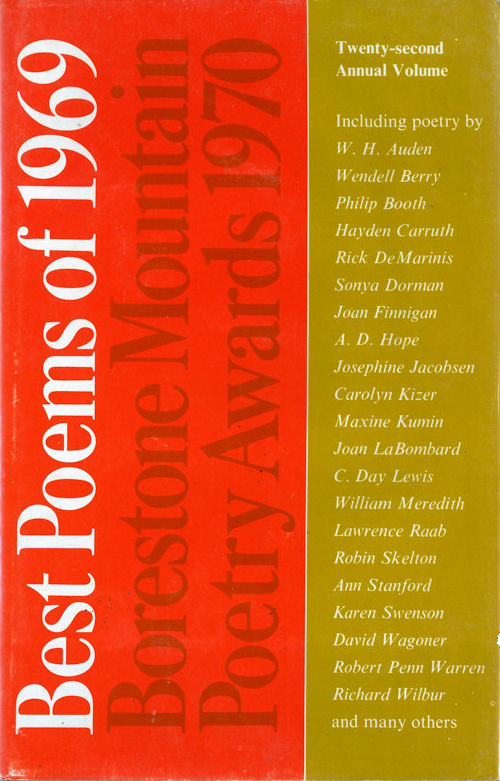
The 1970 Borestone Mountain Poetry Awards anthology included Ashbery's poem "Soonest Mended".

The Borestone Mountain Poetry Awards were a nonprofit literary foundation and annual poetry anthology series released between 1949 and 1977. The Borestone Mountain Poetry Awards anthologies collected the editors' selections of the best original English-language poems of no more than 100 lines published the preceding year in literary magazines. After making an initial selection, the editors read poems with the names of the author and original publication removed and assigned scores. The authors of the three highest-scoring poems received cash prizes and were designated as First, Second, and Third place in the anthology.

Ashbery's poem "Soonest Mended", first published in The Paris Review and included in his collection The Double Day of Spring (1970), was chosen for Best Poems of 1969: Borestone Mountain Poetry Awards 1970. It did not receive one of the top three placements.

==== Pushcart Prize ====
Published annually since 1976, the Pushcart Prize anthologizes the best writing from independently published periodicals including poetry, fiction and nonfiction. Ashbery's poem "All Kinds of Caresses" appeared in The Pushcart Prize, II: Best of the Small Presses. It was nominated by the Chicago Review, the same journal in which it was first published. Ashbery was also a contributing editor for that volume and nominated Douglas Crase's "Cuylerville" and James Schuyler's "Song". Joan Murray and other Pushcart editors also selected the poem for The Pushcart Book of Poetry: The Best Poems From Three Decades of the Pushcart Prize (2006).

==== The Best American Poetry ====
The Best American Poetry series launched in 1988 and is edited by David Lehman. Each year, a different guest editor selects 75 of the year's best American poetry published the preceding year. Ashbery was the guest editor for the first volume, The Best American Poetry 1988, in which he selected his own "One Coat of Paint". Between 1989 and 2017, poems of his were chosen 20 times. Three of those poems were included again in The Best of the Best American Poetry 1988–1997, which compiled Harold Bloom's selections from the 750 poems in the first ten years of the series. His poem "Wakefulness", originally chosen in the 1998 volume, was selected by Robert Pinsky for The Best of the Best American Poetry: 25th Anniversary Edition (2013).

==== Anthologies related to other awards ====
Ashbery's debut collection Some Trees was chosen as the 52nd winner of the Yale Series of Younger Poets Competition and published by Yale University Press in 1956. Five poems from the book were subsequently included in The Yale Younger Poets Anthology, edited by George Bradley and published in 1998: "The Instruction Manual", "The Young Son", "Some Trees", "The Painter", and "The Pied Piper". Later, three poems from Some Trees—"A Boy", "Errors", and "Answering a Question in the Mountains"—were chosen for the series' 2019 centennial anthology Firsts: 100 Years of Yale Younger Poets, edited by Carl Phillips. See the section on the Yale Series of Younger Poets Prize below.

Six of Ashbery's poems were included in The Griffin Poetry Prize 2008 Anthology because his book Notes from the Air: Selected Later Poems was shortlisted for the international Griffin Poetry Prize. He ultimately won that year's international prize. See the section on the Griffin Prize below.

=== Bingham Poetry Prize ===
The Bingham Poetry Prize was an award given by the literary magazine Boston Book Review. (Note: The Bingham Prize is not to be confused with the PEN/Robert W. Bingham Prize for fiction or Worth Bingham Prize for journalism. Additionally, the Boston Book Review is not to be confused with the similarly named Boston Review, another literary magazine.) Established in 1993, the Boston Book Review published ten issues annually until it ceased publication in 2000 and, around 1997–98, reportedly had the third-highest circulation of any American book review periodical. Along with the magazine's Fisk Fiction Prize and Rea Non-Fiction Prize, the Bingham Poetry Prize was an annual award to "celebrate excellent literary accomplishments" that had been published the previous year. Each of the three awards carried a cash prize of $1,000.

Ashbery was a co-winner of the Bingham Poetry Prize for The Mooring of Starting Out: The First Five Books of Poetry, a compilation of his early work. Judged by Jorie Graham, the 1998 prize was also awarded to Frank Bidart, who won for his collection Desire.

Year	Nominee / work	Award	Result	Ref.
1998	The Mooring of Starting Out: The First Five Books of Poetry	The Bingham Poetry Prize	Won	

=== Griffin Poetry Prize ===
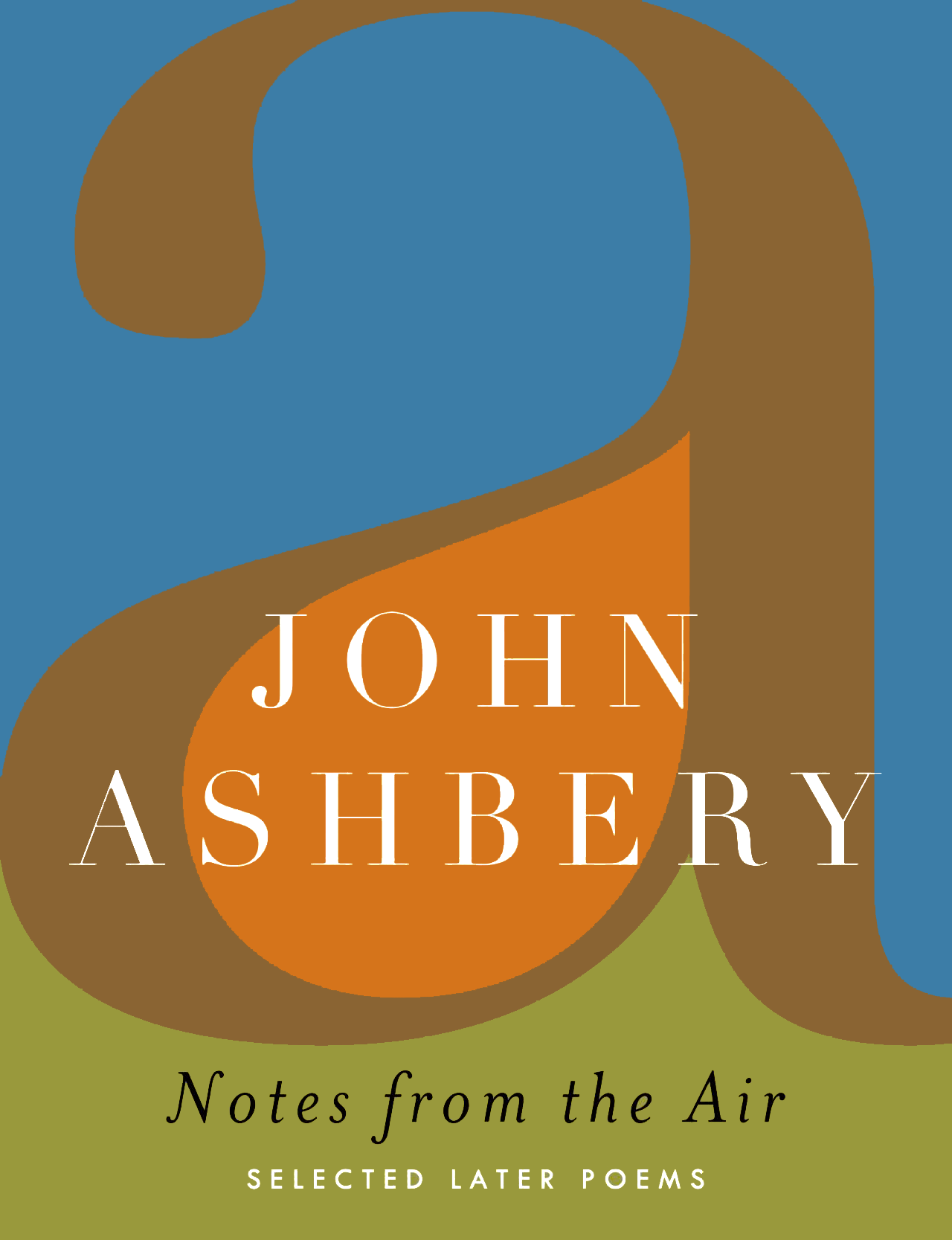
Notes from the Air: Selected Later Poems received the international Griffin Poetry Prize in 2008.

The Griffin Poetry Prize is an annual Canadian literary award established in 2000 by the Griffin Trust for Excellence in Poetry "to serve and encourage excellence in poetry written in or translated into English anywhere in the world." A cash prize is split between winners in two categories: one Canadian and one international author.

Ashbery won the 2008 Griffin Poetry Prize for Notes from the Air: Selected Later Poems. The cash prize that year was CA$50,000, which exchanged for about US$49,032 at the time. A jury of George Bowering, James Lasdun, and Pura López Colomé selected the shortlist and judged the winner. The other shortlisted international titles, selected from a total of 509 submissions overall, were Ripple Effect: New and Selected Poems by Elaine Equi, The Complete Poetry: A Bilingual Edition by César Vallejo in a translation by Clayton Eshleman, and Selected Poems 1969–2005 by David Harsent.

Selections from the shortlisted books, including six poems from Notes from the Air, were anthologized in The Griffin Poetry Prize 2008 Anthology; see the section on anthologies above.

Year	Nominee / work	Award	Result	Ref.
2008	Notes from the Air: Selected Later Poems	The Griffin Poetry Prize (International category)	Won	

=== Longview Foundation Award ===
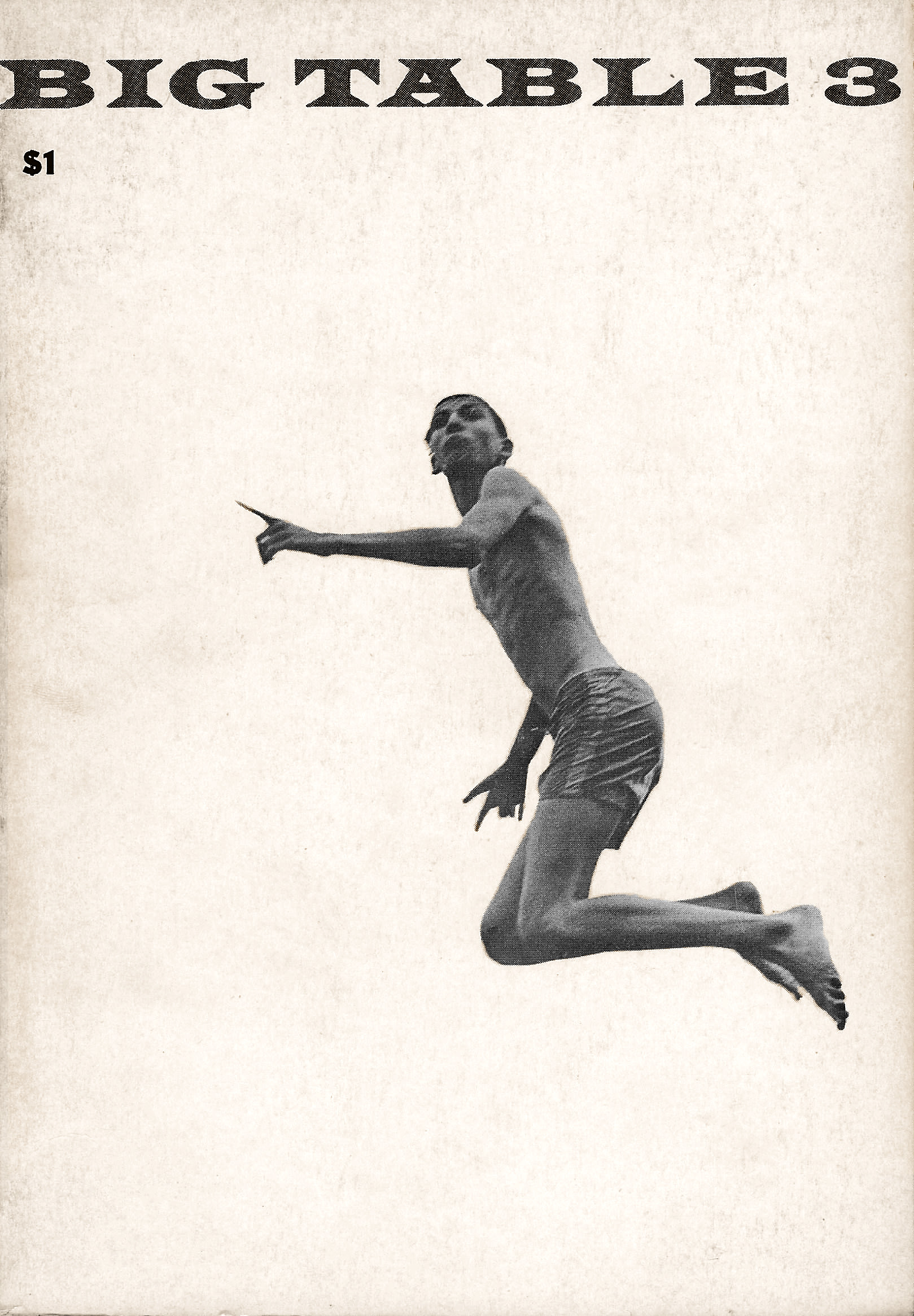
Ashbery received the Longview Foundation Award for two poems published in the literary magazine Big Table 3 (1959).

The Longview Foundation was an organization based in New York City; Harold Rosenberg was its program director. Longview Foundation Awards were selected by a panel of judges from a selection of poems published in independently published little magazines and collections. The award was accompanied by a $300 cash prize. The foundation first gave out awards in 1959 for poetry published in 1957 and 1958.

The second awards were announced in March 1960 for poetry published in 1959, though the announcement did not mention Ashbery. However, he did receive a Longview Foundation Award for two poems, "How Much Longer Will I Be Able to Inhabit the Divine Sepulcher ..." and "April Fool's Day", both of which had been published in Big Table Volume 1, Number 3 (1959). The judges were Saul Bellow, Louise Bogan, Charles Boni, Alfred Kazin, Thomas B. Hess, and Henri Peyre. According to Mark Ford, Ashbery received the prize in part due to advocacy from Donald Barthelme and Thomas Hess.

Year	Nominee / work	Award	Result	Ref.
1960	Two poems from Big Table 3 (1959): "How Much Longer Will I Be Able to Inhabit the Divine Sepulcher ..."; "April Fool's Day"	Longview Foundation Award	Won	

=== Jerome J. Shestack Poetry Prize ===
Since 1984, The American Poetry Review has awarded the Jerome J. Shestack Poetry Prize to the best poems published by the journal in the preceding year. The award is named for Jerome J. Shestack, an attorney and human rights advocate who was also general counsel for the American Poetry Review. Ashbery was one of the first winners of the award for his long poem "A Wave", first published in the July–August 1983 issue. He received the top cash prize of $1,000; the other winners that year were Stephen Dobyns ($500) and Michael Burkard ($250). Ashbery won the award a second time in 1996 for fifteen poems in the January–February 1995 issue, which were subsequently included in his collection Can You Hear, Bird (1995). The year's other winner was Gerald Stern, and both poets received a cash prize of $1,000.

Year	Nominee / work	Award	Result	Ref.
1984	"A Wave" (from the July–August 1983 issue of The American Poetry Review)	Jerome J. Shestack Poetry Prize	Won	
1996	Fifteen poems from the January–February 1995 issue of The American Poetry Review: "Operators Are Standing By"; "The Waiting Ceremony"; "You Would Have Thought"; "The Green Mummies"; "Obedience School"; "Chapter II, Book 35"; "The Blot People"; "Love in Boots"; "Hegel"; "My Name Is Dimitri"; "In an Inchoate Place"; "The Walkways"; "Fascicle"; "The Military Base"; "Limited Liabilities"	Jerome J. Shestack Poetry Prize	Won	

=== Lenore Marshall Poetry Prize ===
Ashbery was announced as the winner of the Lenore Marshall Poetry Prize in 1985 for A Wave. The award, given by The Nation magazine, came with a cash prize of $7,500 at that time. The judges who selected A Wave were John Hollander, Rika Lesser, and Dave Smith. In 2001, Your Name Here was a finalist for the award, which by then was jointly administered by The Nation and the Academy of American Poets. Elaine Equi, Ann Lauterbach, and Bob Perelman judged the competition that year, selecting Fanny Howe as the winner for her Selected Poems.

Year	Nominee / work	Award	Result	Ref.
1985	A Wave	Lenore Marshall Poetry Prize	Won	
2001	Your Name Here	Lenore Marshall Poetry Prize	Finalist	

=== Los Angeles Times Book Prize ===
Ashbery was twice nominated for the Los Angeles Times Book Prize for poetry: once in 1984 for A Wave and again in 1986 for Selected Poems. The poetry prize winners those years were The Maximus Poems (1984) by Charles Olson and Collected Poems, 1948–1984 (1986) by Derek Walcott.

Year	Nominee / work	Award	Result	Ref.
1984	A Wave	Los Angeles Times Book Award	Nominated	
1986	Selected Poems	Los Angeles Times Book Award	Nominated	

=== National Book Award for Poetry ===
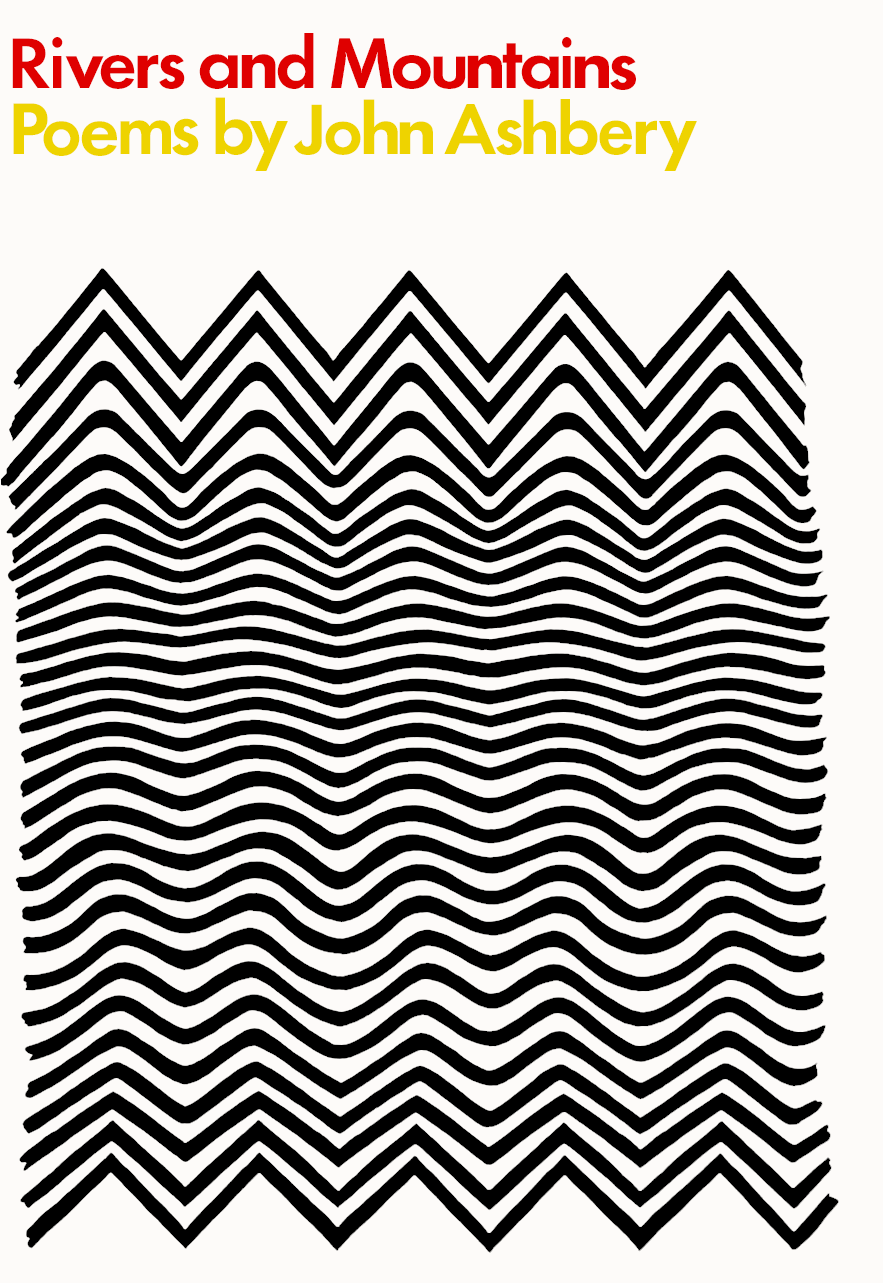
Rivers and Mountains was Ashbery's first book to be nominated for the National Book Award for Poetry.

First presented by the National Book Committee in 1936, the National Book Awards are among the most prestigious American literary awards. The awards, currently administered by the National Book Foundation, have been organized by a variety of groups throughout their history. The National Book Award for Poetry has been bestowed annually since 1950, except for a hiatus between 1984 and 1990. Ashbery won the award once and was a finalist three times.

In 1967, the National Book Committee named Rivers and Mountains as a poetry finalist. It was selected by a judges panel of W. H. Auden, James Dickey, and Howard Nemerov. In 1976, Ashbery won the award—and its cash prize of $1,000—for Self-Portrait in a Convex Mirror. The poetry judges were Babette Deutsch (who was also the panel's chairperson), John Malcolm Brinnin, and James Scully. The awards were administered by the National Institute of Arts and Letters for the first time that year, following the surprise disappearance of the National Book Committee.

When Ashbery was a finalist in 1982 for Shadow Train, the awards were run by the Association of American Publishers and had been renamed the American Book Awards—a change introduced in 1980 that lasted until 1987, when they reverted to the former title. Ashbery received his fourth and final nomination for Where Shall I Wander in 2005, by which time the National Book Foundation coordinated the awards. As a finalist, Ashbery received a $1,000 cash prize and a bronze medal; winners received $10,000 and a bronze statuette.

Year	Nominee / work	Award	Result	Ref.
1967	Rivers and Mountains	National Book Award for Poetry	Finalist	
1976	Self-Portrait in a Convex Mirror	National Book Award for Poetry	Won	
1982	Shadow Train	National Book Award for Poetry (presented as the American Book Award for Poetry)	Finalist	
2005	Where Shall I Wander	National Book Award for Poetry	Finalist	

=== National Book Critics Circle Award ===
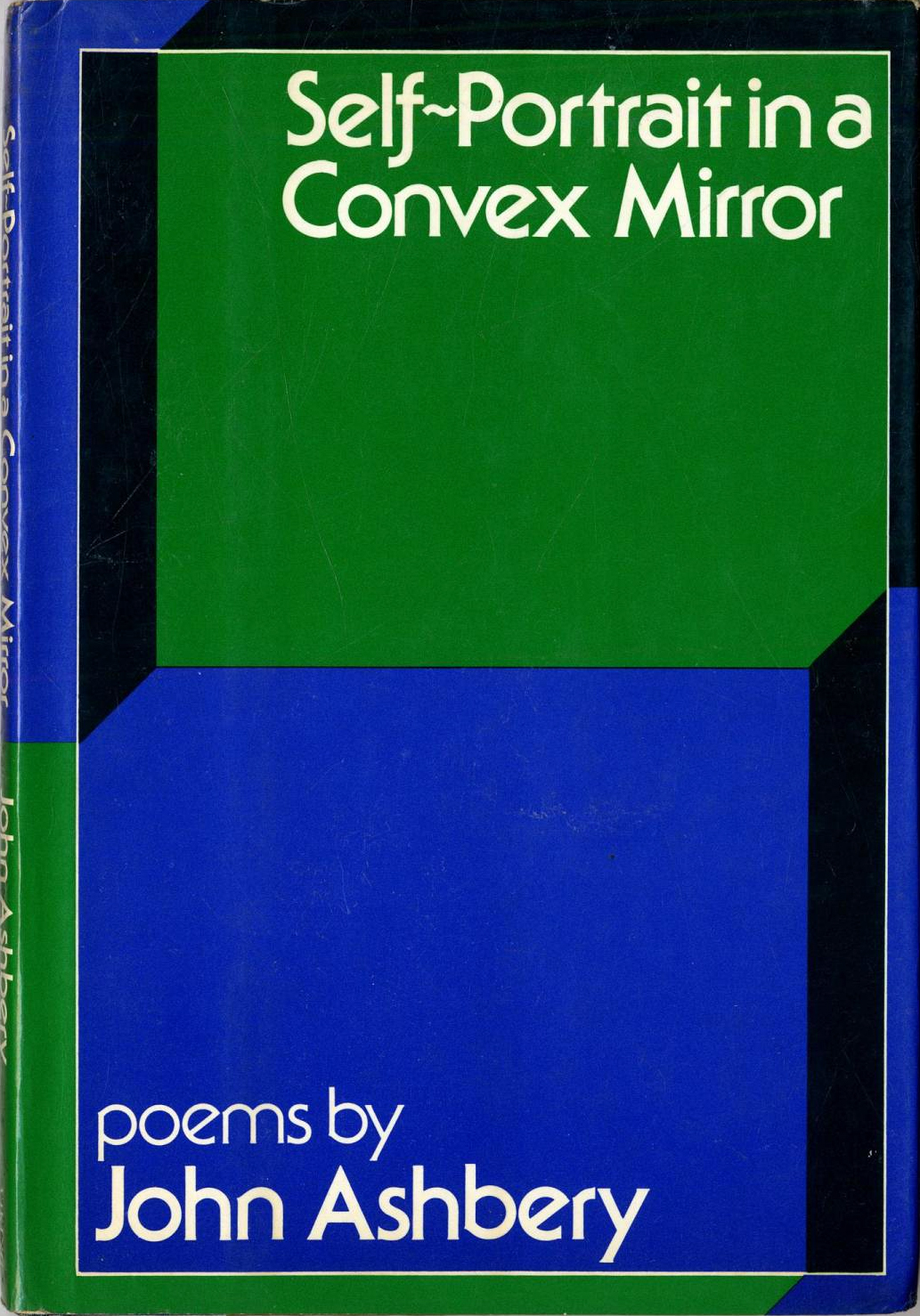
In 1976, Self-Portrait in a Convex Mirror became the first book to win the National Book Critics Circle Award for Poetry.

Ashbery won the inaugural National Book Critics Circle Award for Poetry and was nominated another four times. Self-Portrait in a Convex Mirror was announced as the award's first winner on January 8, 1976. The award is given by the National Book Critics Circle, an association of editors and critics founded in 1974 in New York City. According to Ashbery, the award itself was "almost invented" for him. In an interview with Mark Ford, Ashbery recalled an exchange reportedly sparked by a negative review for his Self-Portrait in The New York Review of Books:

David Kalstone mentioned this review to one of the paper's editors, Elizabeth Hardwick. He said, 'Well, it's too bad John got knocked off his pedestal before he was even on it!' She said, 'What do you mean? He's always winning prizes.' David said, 'No, he's not. He's never won anything.' And Elizabeth, who liked me, said, 'Well, we'll have to see about that.' And she was one of the founders that very year of the National Book Critics Circle Award. Through her efforts, I think, I was the first to get it.

The National Book Critics Circle nominated three more of his original collections: Houseboat Days in 1977, A Wave in 1984, and April Galleons in 1987. He was also announced as a finalist in 2008 for The Landscapist, his translation of Pierre Martory's French poetry collection.

Year	Nominee / work	Award	Result	Ref.
1976	Self-Portrait in a Convex Mirror	National Book Critics Circle Award for Poetry	Won	
1977	Houseboat Days	National Book Critics Circle Award for Poetry	Finalist	
1984	A Wave	National Book Critics Circle Award for Poetry	Finalist	
1987	April Galleons	National Book Critics Circle Award for Poetry	Finalist	
2008	The Landscapist (By Pierre Martory, translated from the French by Ashbery)	National Book Critics Circle Award for Poetry	Finalist	

=== New York Times Book Review accolades ===
The New York Times Book Review is a weekly literary supplement to The New York Times. Within the American publishing industry, it has long been considered one of the most influential and widely read publications. In addition to reviews, news, and other features, the New York Times Book Review has printed unranked lists of best books, including annual "Notable Books" lists in December, "Summer Reading" lists in May or June, and "Editors' Choice" articles highlighting recent recently released books. Books by Ashbery have been included on several of these lists.

Date	Book	List	Ref.
Dec 1956	Some Trees	"Outstanding Books of the Year" (year-end best-of)	
Dec 1969	A Nest of Ninnies; Co-written with James Schuyler	"Outstanding Books of the Year" (year-end best-of)	
Dec 1970	The Double Dream of Spring	"A Selected List From Books of the Year" (year-end best-of)	
Dec 1977	Houseboat Days	"A Selection of Noteworthy Titles" (year-end best-of)	
Jun 1980	As We Know	"Books for Summer Reading" (mid-year best-of)	
Jun 1986	Selected Poems	"Books for Vacation Reading" (mid-year best-of)	
Jun 1988	April Galleons	"Books for Vacation Reading" (mid-year best-of)	
Dec 1988	April Galleons	"Notable Books of the Year" (year-end best-of)	
Dec 1991	Flow Chart	"Notable Books of the Year" (year-end best-of)	
Dec 1994	And the Stars Were Shining	"Notable Books of the Year" (year-end best-of)	
May 1998	The Mooring of Starting Out: The First Five Books of Poetry	"Vacation Reading" (mid-year best-of)	
Dec 1998	The Mooring of Starting Out: The First Five Books of Poetry	"Notable Books of 1998" (year-end best-of)	
Dec 2009	Planisphere	"Editors' Choice" (recent books of interest)	
Jun 2011	Illuminations (By Arthur Rimbaud, translated from the French by Ashbery)	"Editors' Choice" (recent books of interest)	

=== Oxford-Weidenfeld Translation Prize ===
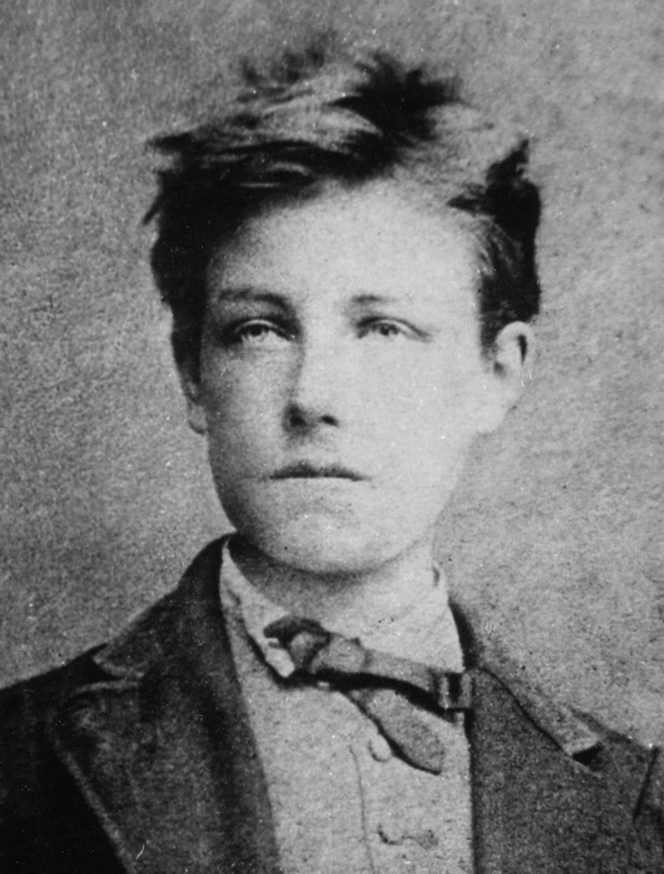
Ashbery was a finalist for the 2012 Oxford-Weidenfeld Translation Prize for his translation of Illuminations by French poet Arthur Rimbaud (pictured in 1871).

The annual Oxford-Weidenfeld Translation Prize is an award recognizing "book-length literary translations into English from any living European language." Funded by and named for George Weidenfeld, Baron Weidenfeld, the prize is administered by the New College, Queen's College, and St. Anne's College at the University of Oxford. As of 2012, the winner would receive £2,000.

Out of 102 submissions, Ashbery was shortlisted for his translation of the French poet Arthur Rimbaud's collection Illuminations. The prize went to Judith Landry for her translation of the Italian novel New Finnish Grammar by Diego Marani.

Year	Nominee / work	Award	Result	Ref.
2012	Illuminations (By Arthur Rimbaud, translated from the French by Ashbery)	Oxford-Weidenfeld Translation Prize	Finalist	

=== Pegasus Award for Poetry Criticism ===
In 2013, the Poetry Foundation announced it would be accepting submissions for its new Pegasus Award for Poetry Criticism, to be awarded for the first time on June 9, 2014. The award contest accepts any book-length nonfiction work about poetry or the lives of poets published in the preceding year. Ashbery was named as a finalist for his Collected French Translations: Poetry and Collected French Translations: Prose, edited by Rosanne Wasserman and Eugene Richie. That year's Pegasus Award went to the University of California Press for two volumes of collected writings by Robert Duncan. The winner of the award received $7,500 and each of the five finalists received $1,000.

Year	Nominee / work	Award	Result	Ref.
2014	Collected French Translations: Poetry and Collected French Translations: Prose	Pegasus Award for Poetry Criticism	Finalist	

=== Poetry Book Society Recommended Translation ===
The London Poetry Book Society publishes a quarterly bulletin of its book choices, recommendations, and special commendations. In 2011, Carol Rumens said these designations have the prestige of a literary award and are "a milestone for poets, signalling achievement or progress." In Autumn 2008, Ashbery's translation of Pierre Martory's The Landscapist was chosen as the Poetry Book Society's Recommended Translation by selector Mimi Khalvati.

Year	Nominee / work	Award	Result	Ref.
2008	The Landscapist (By Pierre Martory, translated from the French by Ashbery)	Poetry Book Society Recommended Translation	Won	

=== Poetry magazine awards ===
Ashbery was a frequent contributor to Poetry and won several awards from the magazine for poems published in its pages. His first, in 1963, was the Harriet Monroe Memorial Prize of $100 for five poems in that year's June issue. That year's prize winners were decided by a panel of Wallace Fowlie, Joseph Wiley, and then-editor Henry Rago. Three years later, the same three judges awarded Ashbery the Union League Civic and Arts Foundation Poetry Prize of $100 for the poem "Fragment", published in February 1966. The prize was sponsored by the Union League Club of Chicago.

In 1974 he received the Frank O'Hara Prize, named in memory of his friend and fellow poet Frank O'Hara, who had died in 1966. The award and its $500 cash prize recognized poems from the November 1973, April 1974, and August 1974 issues, which included the title poem from Self-Portrait in a Convex Mirror and others that would appear in the same collection. He received the $300 Levinson Prize, named for the attorney Salmon Levinson and created by an endowment of his family, in 1977 for poems in the April and August issues. Two years later he received the first English-Speaking Union Prize, awarded by the Junior Board of the titular organization and valued at $1,000, for seven poems from July 1979.

Year	Nominee / work	Award	Result	Ref.
1963	Five poems from the June 1963 issue: "A Blessing in Disguise"; "If the Birds Knew"; "Last Month"; "The Recent Past"; "Civilization and Its Discontents"	Harriet Monroe Memorial Prize	Won	
1966	One poem from the February 1966 issue: "Fragment"	Union League Civic and Arts Foundation Poetry Prize	Won	
1974	Five poems published in Poetry, 1973–74: "As You Came from the Holy Land" (November 1973); "A Man of Words" (November); "Scheherazade" (November); "Grand Galop" (April 1974); "Self-Portrait in a Convex Mirror" (August)	Frank O'Hara Prize	Won	
1977	Four poems published in Poetry, 1977: "Syringa" (April); "Blue Sonata" (April); "The Ice-Cream Wars" (April); "Fantasia on 'The Nut-Brown Maid'" (August)	Levinson Prize	Won	
1979	Seven poems published in the July 1979 issue: "Late Echo"; "Train Rising Out of the Station"; "Not Only / But Also"; "Many Wagons Ago"; "The Sun"; "Five Pedantic Pieces"; "Flowering Death"	The English-Speaking Union Prize	Won	

=== Pulitzer Prize for Poetry ===
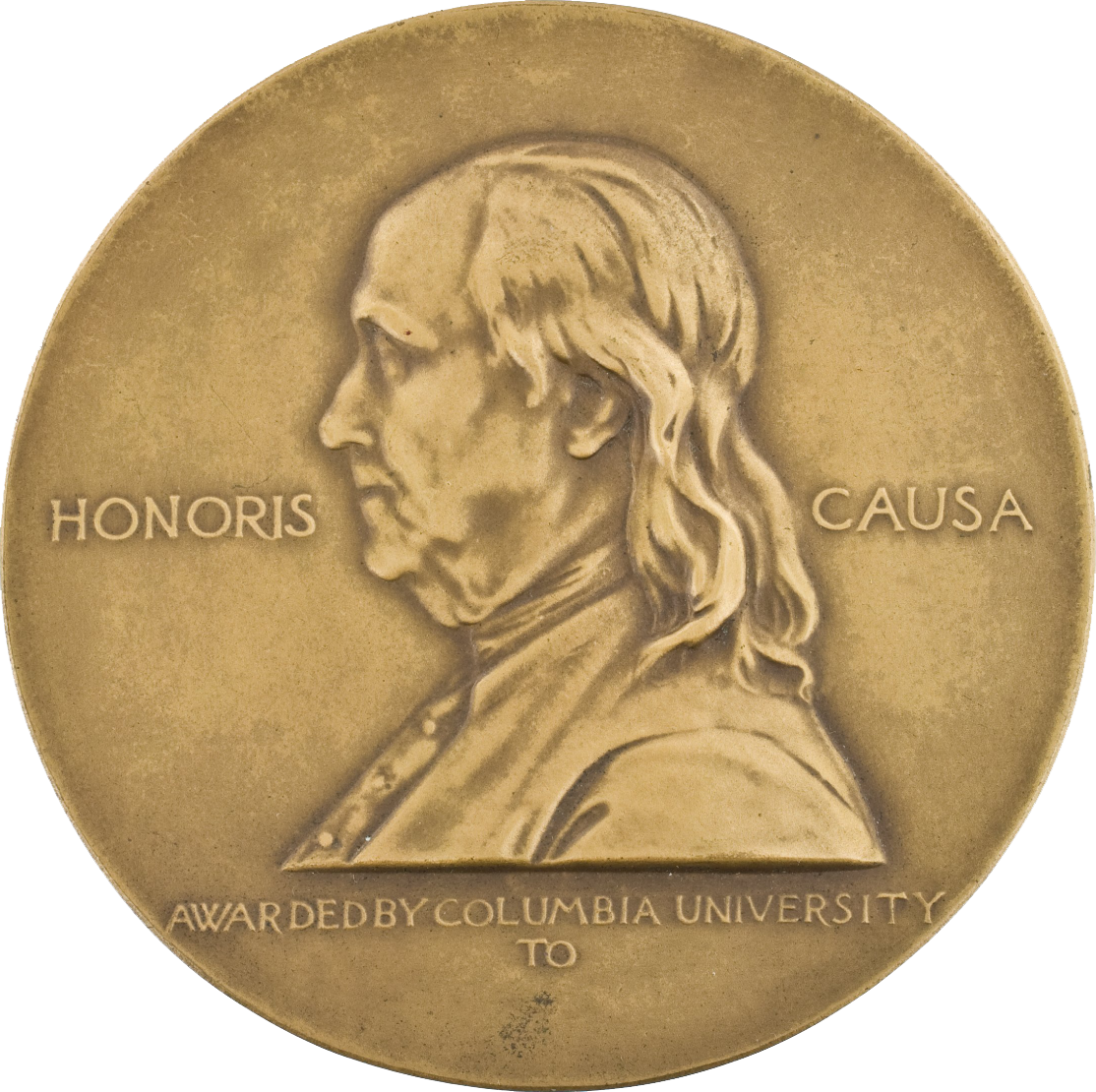
The Pulitzer Public Service medal (obverse shown) is a symbol of the Pulitzer Prizes in general. Ashbery won the Pulitzer for Poetry in 1976 and was a finalist in 1993.

The Pulitzer Prizes have been administered by Columbia University since 1917 and are currently awarded in 21 categories for accomplishments in journalism, literature, and music. Columbia first awarded an informal Poetry Prize in 1918 and formally introduced the Pulitzer Prize for Poetry in 1922. The winner of a Pulitzer Prize for Poetry receives a certificate and a cash prize. Although the value of the cash prize has steadily increased throughout the years, it has been considered fairly low within the field of literary awards throughout most of its history. However, the award's high public prestige and associated rise in sales have outpaced other awards with higher cash prizes.

Self-Portrait in a Convex Mirror won the 1976 Pulitzer Prize for Poetry. At that time, the award's cash prize was $1,000. The book was unanimously selected by a jury of Anthony Hecht, Richard Howard, and Mark Strand, who also shortlisted Buried City by Howard Moss, The Western Approaches by Howard Nemerov, and Tales Told by Fathers by John Hollander. In the jury's report to the Pulitzer Advisory Board, Hecht wrote:

In his seventh book of poems, ... Ashbery has responded to those impulses of recuperation, of recurrence and reversion which poetry incarnates, observing its beginning and endings by a prosody of intermittence and collage rather than by any such conventional markings as rhyme or refrain.

Ashbery was a finalist in 1993 for Hotel Lautréamont, nominated by a jury of Frank Bidart, Bonnie Costello, and Charles Wright. Louise Glück won that year for The Wild Iris, while James Merrill's Selected Poems 1946–1985 was also nominated.

Year	Nominee / work	Award	Result	Ref.
1976	Self-Portrait in a Convex Mirror	Pulitzer Prize for Poetry	Won	
1993	Hotel Lautréamont	Pulitzer Prize for Poetry	Finalist	

=== Shelley Memorial Award ===
Named for the English Romantic poet Percy Bysshe Shelley (1792–1822), the Shelley Memorial Award was established in 1929. It is administered by the Poetry Society of America (PSA) and awarded on the basis of "genius and need". The three-person jury is appointed by the president (chancellor) of the University of California, Berkeley, the president of Radcliffe College, and the PSA board of directors.

In 1973, Ashbery and Richard Wilbur were both awarded the Shelley Memorial Award. He received a cash prize of $1,800. The award was granted in recognition of his collection Three Poems (1972).

Year	Nominee / work	Award	Result	Ref.
1973	Three Poems	Shelley Memorial Award	Won	

=== SWR-Bestenliste ===
Südwestrundfunk (SWR) is a German public broadcasting corporation with television and radio stations. SWR releases the SWR-Bestenliste (Best List), a monthly ranking of recently released books as scored by a jury of critics. SWR's predecessor Südwestfunk (SWF) began the Bestenliste in 1976, when it was conceived as an alternative to Der Spiegel's strictly sales-based booklist.

German translations of Ashbery's poetry have appeared on the Bestenliste twice. Ein weltgewandtes Land, a bilingual edition of the collection A Worldly Country with translations by multiple German poets, ranked in first place on the December 2010 list with 69 points. Flussbild, a bilingual edition of Flow Chart with a German translation by Matthias Göritz and Uda Strätling, ranked tenth in May 2013 with 29 points.

Date	Book	List	Rank	Ref.
2010	Ein weltgewandtes Land; Bilingual edition of A Worldly Country with German translations by multiple authors	SWR-Bestenliste	1st	
2013	Flussbild; Bilingual edition of Flow Chart with a German translation by Matthias Göritz and Uda Strätling	SWR-Bestenliste	10th	

=== Yale Series of Younger Poets Prize ===
1.0

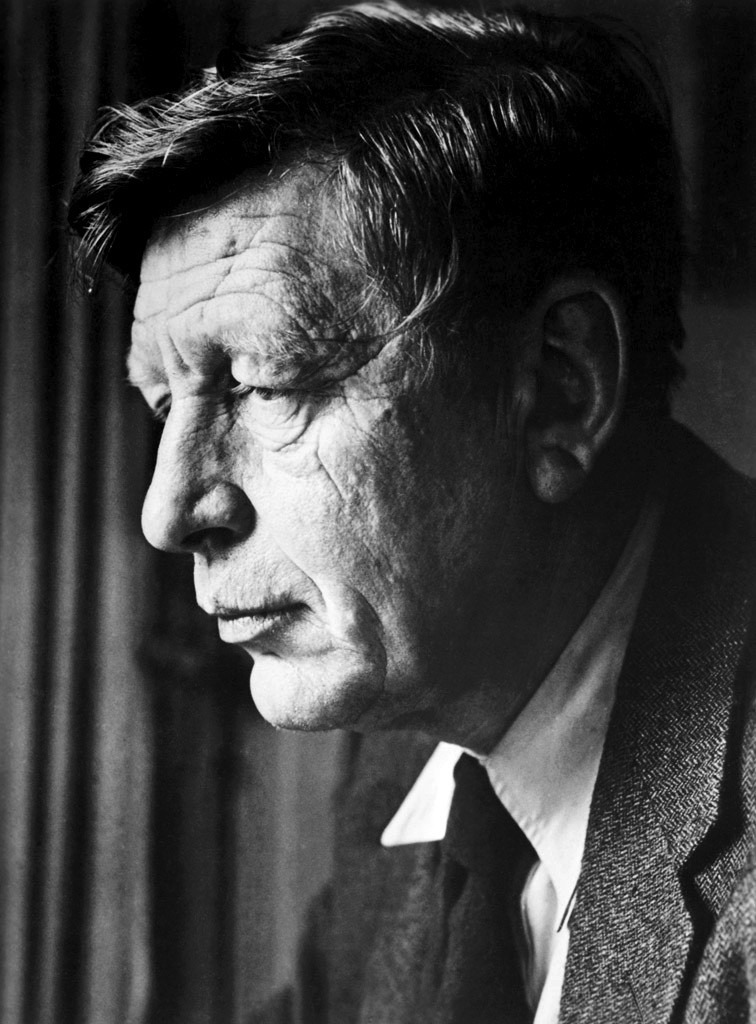
Auden c. 1956

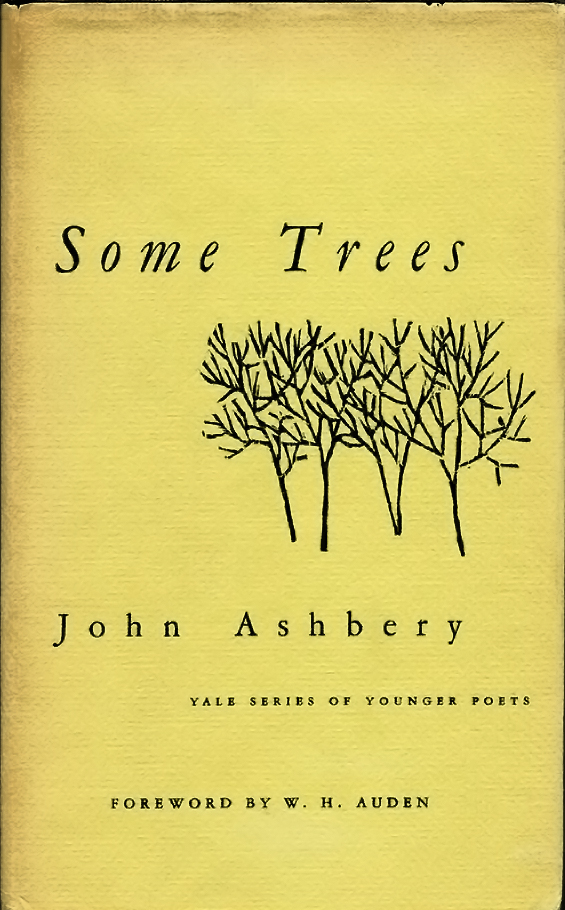
Some Trees, 1st ed.

W. H. Auden selected Ashbery as the winner of the Yale Series of Younger Poets Competition in 1955. As a result, Yale University Press published Ashbery's first collection, Some Trees, with a foreword by Auden.

Established in 1919, the Yale Series of Younger Poets Competition is the longest-running poetry prize in the United States. It began as a competition to recognize undergraduate poets at Yale University before expanding to accept any poets under the age of 30 (and later, 40) who had not yet published their first book. Each year, Yale University Press publishes the winner's debut book of poetry.

The preliminary round of the contest is judged by a team of editors, mostly graduate students, who pass on their recommendations to an editor selected by the board of Yale University Press. The editor is typically a leading figure in poetry who is not necessarily otherwise associated with Yale. W. H. Auden judged the competition between 1946 and 1958, a run considered to be the best in the competition's history due to the high number of winners who went on to acclaimed and noteworthy careers in poetry. Alongside Ashbery, some of the highly regarded winners selected by Auden include James Wright, Adrienne Rich, W. S. Merwin, and John Hollander.

Ashbery won the 1955 Younger Poets Competition, but only following a complicated and somewhat unfavorable process. Both he and Frank O'Hara, his friend and a fellow Harvard alumnus, were eliminated by the first round judges. However, Auden found himself dissatisfied with all of the twelve manuscripts that he had been given. He asked Ashbery and O'Hara to resubmit their poems directly to him and, a week later, decided he preferred Ashbery's submission. He named Ashbery the winner despite his own personal reservations about the avant-garde style and influence from surrealism in Ashbery's poetry, which he found alienating and often nonsensical. Ashbery's debut poetry collection, Some Trees, was published in 1956 with a foreword by Auden.

Poems from Some Trees have been subsequently included in two anthologies related to the Younger Poets series; see the section on "best-of" anthologies above.

Year	Nominee / work	Award	Result	Ref.
1955	Some Trees	Yale Series of Younger Poets Prize	Won	

== Grants and fellowships ==
Ashbery received several grants and fellowships that provided monetary support for his creative output as a writer. The amount of money he received is provided, if known; if not, in some cases an approximate amount or possible range is given based on other sources describing the award.

Year	Category	Institution	Result or amount received	Ref.
1951	Fulbright Program scholarship	Bureau of Educational and Cultural Affairs (ECA) of the US State Department	Rejected	
1952	Fulbright Program scholarship	Bureau of Educational and Cultural Affairs (ECA) of the US State Department	Rejected	
1953	Fulbright Program scholarship	Bureau of Educational and Cultural Affairs (ECA) of the US State Department	Rejected	
1954	Fulbright Program scholarship	Bureau of Educational and Cultural Affairs (ECA) of the US State Department	Rejected	
1955	Fulbright Program scholarship	Bureau of Educational and Cultural Affairs (ECA) of the US State Department	Accepted	
1956	Fulbright Program scholarship	Bureau of Educational and Cultural Affairs (ECA) of the US State Department	Extended	
1960	Grant	Poets' Foundation	~$500–$1,500 (Note: Allen Ginsberg received $1,000 from the Poets' Foundation in 1960. John Wieners received $1,500 in 1962. Philip Whalen received $500 in 1962 and, according to Whalen, Ron Loewinsohn received $1,000 in 1964.)	
1962	Grant	Ingram Merrill Foundation	~$4,000–$6,000 (Note: According to Edmund White, the Ingram Merrill Foundation "gave small grants of five or six thousand dollars to many needy writers." The foundation reportedly awarded a grant of $4,000 to Helen Adam, a Scottish poet, in June 1964. American poet Elizabeth Bishop received $5,000 from the foundation in December 1968.)	
1964	Grant	Poets' Foundation	~$500–$1,500	
1967	Guggenheim Fellowship (1967)	John Simon Guggenheim Memorial Foundation	~$7,430 (Approx., based on 1967 avg.)	
1969	Publication award	National Endowment for the Arts (NEA)	$500	
1969	Arts and Letters Award	National Institute of Arts and Letters (Now known as the American Academy of Arts and Letters)	$5,000	
1972	Grant	Ingram Merrill Foundation	~$4,000–$6,000	
1973	Guggenheim Fellowship (1973)	John Simon Guggenheim Memorial Foundation	~$11,252 (Approx., based on 1973 avg.)	
1976	Composer–Librettist grant (with Elliott Carter)	National Endowment for the Arts (NEA)	$4,350	
1979	Grant for playwright‐in‐residence program (1979–80 season)	Rockefeller Foundation	$9,000	
1982	Fellowship	Academy of American Poets	$10,000	
1985	MacArthur Fellow	MacArthur Foundation	$272,000	
1985	Wallace Stevens fellowship	Timothy Dwight College at Yale University	Appointed	

=== Fulbright Program ===
Hoping to live in France, Ashbery applied for the Fulbright Program multiple times starting in 1950. He was rejected five times. However, he was accepted into the program in 1955 after an initial rejection because another applicant decided to withdraw. He lived in Montpellier and translated French poetry. As part of his Fulbright project, he translated works by Jules Supervielle, Paul Éluard, and Francis Ponge, which much later appeared in his Collected French Translations. His Fulbright was extended for a second year, during which he taught American studies in Rennes. According to his own recollection in 2014, his monthly stipend had been about $135 (equivalent to about $1,300 in 2025, adjusted for inflation). After the grant expired, he moved to Paris and lived there until 1965.

=== Poets' Foundation ===
The Poets' Foundation—not to be confused with the Chicago-based Poetry Foundation—was an anonymously funded organization in New York. Ashbery received two grants from the Poets' Foundation: one in 1960, the other in 1964. The amounts Ashbery received from the foundation are not publicly known; other poets reportedly received grants ranging from $500 to $1,500 in the early-to-mid 1960s.

=== Ingram Merrill Foundation ===
American poet James Merrill established the Ingram Merrill Foundation in the 1950s. Merrill was a son of businessman Charles E. Merrill, who co-founded the investment and wealth management company Merrill Lynch. After the deaths of both his father and mother in 1956, Merrill received a substantial inheritance. He used the money to fund his own creative endeavors and to create the foundation, which provided grants to writers and artists until its dissolution in 1996. Though Merrill was a foundation board member, the foundation ostensibly made its grant-making decisions on an independent basis without his influence. He relied on this formal separation from the foundation to preserve normal social relations with other artists; he did not want to appear to be granting favors to friends, or to put others in the awkward position of personally asking him for funding. However, in practice Merrill retained final authority over the foundation's actions. He relied on the advice of colleagues like John Hollander and Irma Brandeis .

Ashbery received grants from the Ingram Merrill Foundation in 1962 and 1972. It is not known how much money Ashbery received from the foundation, but its typical grant sizes ranged from about $4,000 to $6,000.

=== Guggenheim Fellowships ===
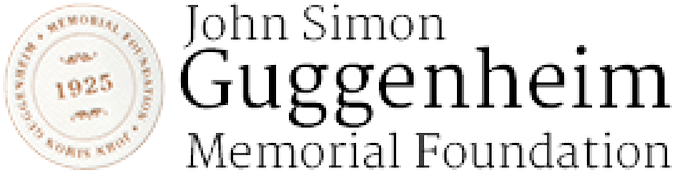

Guggenheim Fellowships, disbursed by the John Simon Guggenheim Memorial Foundation since 1925, are grants intended "to help provide Fellows with blocks of time in which they can work with as much creative freedom as possible." Individuals are selected for fellowships through an application process. The amount of a grant varies depending on the foundation's budget, the scope of the applicant's creative project, and the extent of other financial resources available to the fellow.

Starting in 1955, Ashbery applied for a Guggenheim Fellowship eleven times. He was named a fellow two times—first in 1967, then in 1973. While the amounts of money he received through the program are not publicly known, the program's average grant sizes in those years were $7,430 and $11,252, respectively. He used the proceeds of his first fellowship to travel to Europe in 1968, visiting Pierre Martory in Paris then Switzerland and Italy with his mother. The second fellowship allowed him to delay taking a job teaching at Brooklyn College until 1974 so he could focus on writing poetry in the meantime. His poetry collections The Double Dream of Spring (1970) and Self-Portrait in a Convex Mirror (1975) include notes of acknowledgement to the Guggenheim Foundation.

=== National Endowment for the Arts (NEA) ===

In fiscal year 1969, he received a publication award of $500 from the National Endowment for the Arts (NEA). The award was given in recognition of his poem "Spring Day", first published in a 1967 issue of The Paris Review, and resulted in the poem's inclusion in The American Literary Anthology, Volume 2. Vance Bourjaily, Robert Duncan, Albert Guerard, Mark Harris, Philip Roth, Anne Sexton, Roger Shattuck, John Simon, and Louis Simpson.

In 1975, he applied for a Composer–Librettist grant from the NEA along with the modernist composer Elliott Carter. Their collaboration resulted in the musical piece Syringa, set to Ashbery's poem of the same name and several texts in Greek. Although Ashbery wrote several original libretti for Carter, the composer was inspired by the previously published "Syringa" and chose to use it instead. As such, Ashbery did not ultimately contribute new writing to the composition. Nevertheless, his grant—in the amount of $4,350—was not revoked.

=== Rockefeller Foundation ===
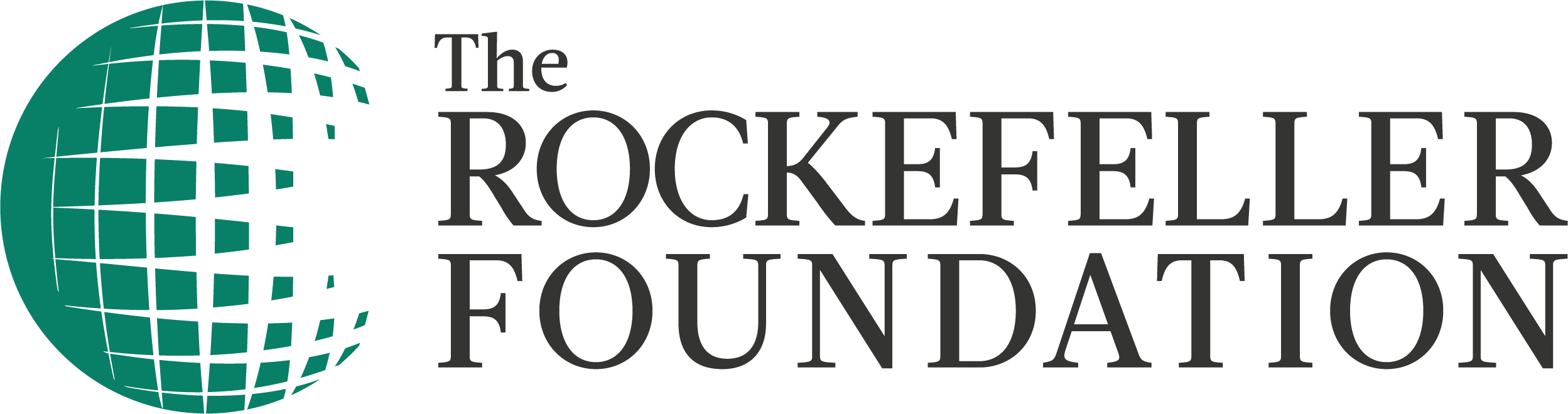

The Rockefeller Foundation is a large American private foundation. In 1971, it launched a yearly program of writing grants for a "playwright-in-residence" program, pairing a writer together with a theater with the goal of staging an original production. Eight or nine playwrights were chosen each year based on nominations taken from theaters and from the panel of judges followed by deliberation of the judges; applications were not accepted. Each playwright would receive $8,500 outright with an additional $500 for relocation expenses, while each designated theater would receive $4,000. There were little to no conditions placed upon receipt of the grant—according to The New York Times, one grant-winning playwright used the money to purchase a Ferrari sports car.

Although best known for poetry, Ashbery was also involved in theater early in his career and wrote several experimental plays, most of which were published together in the 1978 book Three Plays. He had largely abandoned dramatic writing by the time his first poetry collection was published in 1956. In an October 1978 interview, he described an untitled dramatic "work-in-progress" of about 100 pages that he had been developing, on and off, for several years. However, his final new play was To the Mill, published in 1960 as part of The Hasty Papers magazine edited by Alfred Leslie. It is not clear what became of the "work-in-progress".

Jack Larson, an actor and writer, nominated Ashbery and two others for the Rockefeller Foundation's playwright-in-residence program in 1978. In December 1978, the Rockefeller Foundation announced Ashbery and eight playwrights would receive grants under the program, though he was the only one listed without a paired theater. The New York Times announced the grant awards three months later, but still listed Ashbery only as "theater to be determined". It does not seem to be the case that he ultimately worked with a theater under the "playwright-in-residence" program, but he did receive the grant.

=== MacArthur Fellowship ===

In 1985, the MacArthur Foundation named Ashbery as one of 25 new MacArthur Fellows. Colloquially known as the "genius" grant, the fellowship is given to "outstandingly talented and creative people" so that they may "pursue whatever they believe is important and relevant", without conditions or limitations on how they spend the grant money. At the time, each fellow received between $155,000 and $300,000 over the course of five years, with higher value based on age. Between 1985 and 1990, Ashbery received $272,000, or $54,400 a year. Because of the MacArthur Fellowship, he was able to quit his jobs as a professor at Brooklyn College and as an art critic at Newsweek.

=== Wallace Stevens fellowship ===
The Wallace Stevens fellowship, named for American poet Wallace Stevens, was a program of the Timothy Dwight College at Yale University. It was established in 1976 by an anonymous donation from a fellow from the college. An annual program, the fellowship invited a prominent poet to come to the college and give readings of their work. The first Wallace Stevens fellow was Richard Eberhart, who was in residence at the college at the time. Ashbery was appointed to the fellowship in 1985.

== Honors for cumulative or lifetime achievement ==
The following awards and honors were bestowed in recognition of Ashbery as an individual, either for lifetime achievement or the cumulative sum of his literary career and oeuvre.

=== Academic honors ===
Ashbery received several honors from universities and academic institutions.

==== Honorary degrees ====
Ashbery completed his formal education in 1951 with an M.A. at Columbia. He briefly considered going for a PhD, even beginning work on a dissertation about the life of French poet Raymond Roussel, but abandoned the project before completion.

While the M.A. was the highest degree he attained through schooling, he received honorary degrees at the DLitt (Doctor of Letters) level from the following universities and colleges:

- The Southampton College of Long Island University (1979)
- The University of Rochester (1994)
- Harvard University (2001)
- Pace University (2003)
- Yale University (2008)
- Middlebury College (2012)

==== Accademia dei Lincei ====
In 2006, Ashbery was elected a foreign member of the Italian Accademia dei Lincei in Rome. He had previously received its prestigious Antonio Feltrinelli International Prize; see the section on the Feltrinelli Prize below.

==== Bard College ====
Bard College is a private liberal arts college in Annandale-on-Hudson, New York. Ashbery—who was appointed as the Charles P. Stevenson Jr., Professor of Languages and Literature at Bard in 1990—received several honors from the college:

- In 1983, Ashbery was named the winner of Bard's Charles Flint Kellogg Award in Arts and Letters. The annual award recognizes a person who has made "a significant contribution to the American artistic or literary heritage."
- Since 1995, the college has a recurrent reading event called the John Ashbery Poetry Series named in his honor.
- At the occasion of the poet's 80th birthday in 2007, Ann Lauterbach held a weekend-long celebration at the college and the college's biennial literary journal Conjunctions dedicated a "special birthday anthology" issue to him. The issue, edited by Peter Gizzi and Bradford Morrow, featured personal essays from writers responding to Ashbery's poetry and reprinted some of his rare early writings.

==== Brandeis University ====
The Creative Arts Awards of Brandeis University in Waltham, Massachusetts recognizes "active American artists" with honors in three categories: the Creative Arts Medal, for lifetime achievement; the Creative Arts Citation, for "mid-career" achievement; and the Special Award for Notable Achievement in the Creative Arts, for an artist who has made "singular cultural contributions".

In May 1989, Ashbery received the Creative Arts Medal for Poetry at the 33rd Creative Arts Awards. The ceremony took place at the Guggenheim Museum in New York. The Brandeis Review said he was "credited with creating the most original and influential poetic mode of our time." Other medalists that year were Louise Bourgeois for sculpture, Jonas Mekas for film, Mel Powell for music.

==== Deerfield Academy ====
In 1984, Ashbery received the Heritage Award from the Deerfield Academy Alumni Association. He began attending the Massachusetts college-preparatory boarding school in 1943, published poetry in its student newspaper, The Deerfield Scroll, and graduated in 1945. Each year, the Heritage Award recognizes "a Deerfield alumnus or alumna whose professional and personal achievements represent a special contribution to the betterment of society." Other noteworthy recipients have included diplomat Rick Barton, meteorologist Kerry Emanuel, physician Caldwell Esselstyn, architect Hugh Hardy, writer and television producer Budd Schulberg, and executive Alan Hassenfeld.

==== Harvard University ====
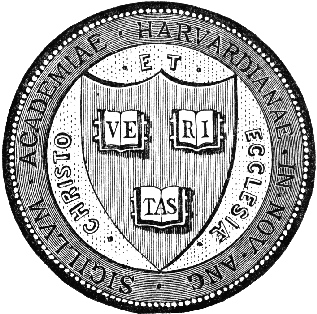

Ashbery received several honors from his undergraduate alma mater, Harvard, and from organizations related to the school:

- In 1979, he was named the Phi Beta Kappa Poet at Harvard and was inducted as a member. Founded as a fraternity in 1776, Phi Beta Kappa (ΦΒΚ) is an academic honor society with chapters throughout the United States. Its Harvard chapter, chartered in 1779, was the longest-running chapter when it merged into a broader Massachusetts chapter in 1995. Chosen annually, the Phi Beta Kappa poet gives a reading during commencement week events; other Phi Beta Kappa poets at Harvard have included W. H. Auden, Robert Frost, Henry Wadsworth Longfellow, Robert Lowell, and Wallace Stevens. Ashbery later judged the first Phi Beta Kappa poetry competition in 2001, awarding a $10,000 prize and bronze medal to Kenneth Koch from a field of 200 applicants.
- Ashbery was selected to give the Charles Eliot Norton Lecture for the 1989–90 academic year. Named for Charles Eliot Norton, the annual lecture series on poetry—defined broadly enough to include poetic expressions like music and architecture—is considered one of the most highly prestigious of the hundreds at Harvard. Each of his six lectures surveyed the work of an under-appreciated "minor" poet from whom he had taken inspiration: they were John Clare, Thomas Lovell Beddoes, Raymond Roussel, John Wheelwright, Laura Riding, and David Schubert. These lectures were later published by Harvard University Press in the book Other Traditions (2000).
- The Signet Society is an exclusive literary society at Harvard. Ashbery joined as an undergraduate, completing his initiation by performing an original Henry James parody titled "Return of the Screw". Other noteworthy members who pursued poetry include James Agee, Conrad Aiken, T. S. Eliot, and John Updike. The Signet Society Medal for Achievement in the Arts has been awarded on an annual basis since 1937. Ashbery was named a Signet Medalist in 2001. He was subsequently named the honorary poet of the Signet Society Annual Dinner in 2006.
- In 2009, Ashbery received the Harvard Arts Medal at that year's Arts First festival at the university. According to Harvard Magazine, the award "celebrates alumni and faculty members whose excellence in the arts has served education or the public good." After an introduction by fellow Harvard alum John Lithgow, Ashbery discussed his work with scholar Daniel Chiasson and then received the medal from the university president, Drew Gilpin Faust.

==== New York University ====
In May 2011, the New York University Center for French Civilization and Culture conferred its Medal of Honor to Ashbery.

==== Pasadena City College ====
In 1985, Ashbery was named the Poet of the Year at Pasadena City College, a public community college in Pasadena, California. Since 1975, the Poet of the Year designation has been made by the college's literary journal Inscape.

=== Ambassador Book Award ===
In 2008, Ashbery received an Ambassador Book Award for Lifetime Achievement from the English-Speaking Union of the United States. He was recognized in part for his recently published book Notes from the Air: Selected Later Poems.

=== America Award in Literature ===
The America Award in Literature has been presented annually by Douglas Messerli's Los Angeles-based publishing company Green Integer since 1994. Considered an alternative to the Nobel Prize in Literature, it has been decided by a rotating panel that has included Messerli, Will Alexander, Luigi Ballerini, Charles Bernstein, Peter Constantine, Peter Glassgold, Deborah Meadows, Martin Nakell, John O'Brien, Marjorie Perloff, Dennis Phillips, Joe Ross, Jerome Rothenberg, Paul Vangelisti, and Mac Wellman. Ashbery received the award in 2008.

=== American Academy of Achievement Golden Plate ===
The American Academy of Achievement presents the Golden Plate to about 25 individuals at its annual International Achievement Summit. Launched in 1961, the award is given in recognition of achievement in one of five categories: the arts, public service, science & exploration, business, and sports. Ashbery received a Golden Plate in 1987. He was the second poet to receive the award, following Theodore Roethke.

=== American Academy of Arts and Letters Gold Medal for Poetry ===
Every year since 1909, the American Academy of Arts and Letters has awarded two of its Gold Medals recognizing lifetime achievement, rotating between the following paired categories: "Belles Lettres and Criticism" and "Painting"; "Biography" and "Music"; "Fiction" and "Sculpture"; "History" and "Architecture (including Landscape Architecture)"; "Poetry" and "Music"; and "Drama" and "Graphic Art". Ashbery received the gold medal for Poetry at a ceremony in Harlem on May 21, 1997, before an audience of 700. The other gold medal recipient that year was the composer Gunther Schuller.

=== Antonio Feltrinelli International Prize ===
The Feltrinelli Prize is an annual award given by the Italian Accademia dei Lincei in Rome. The award rotates each year to recognize achievement within one of a variety of categories, which include literature, arts, and sciences. In 1992, Ashbery became the first poet to win the Feltrinelli Prize in 15 years. He received a cash prize in Italian lire of ₤200 million, which at the exchange rate of the time was worth about $150,000.

=== Best of Brooklyn ("BoBi") Award ===
Since 2007, the annual Brooklyn Book Festival has presented its Best of Brooklyn (or "BoBi") Award to "an author whose body of work exemplifies or speaks to the spirit of Brooklyn." Ashbery received the award in 2010. He also read poetry and spoke on a panel with the first "BoBi" winner, Paul Auster.

Ashbery at the 2010 Brooklyn Book Festival

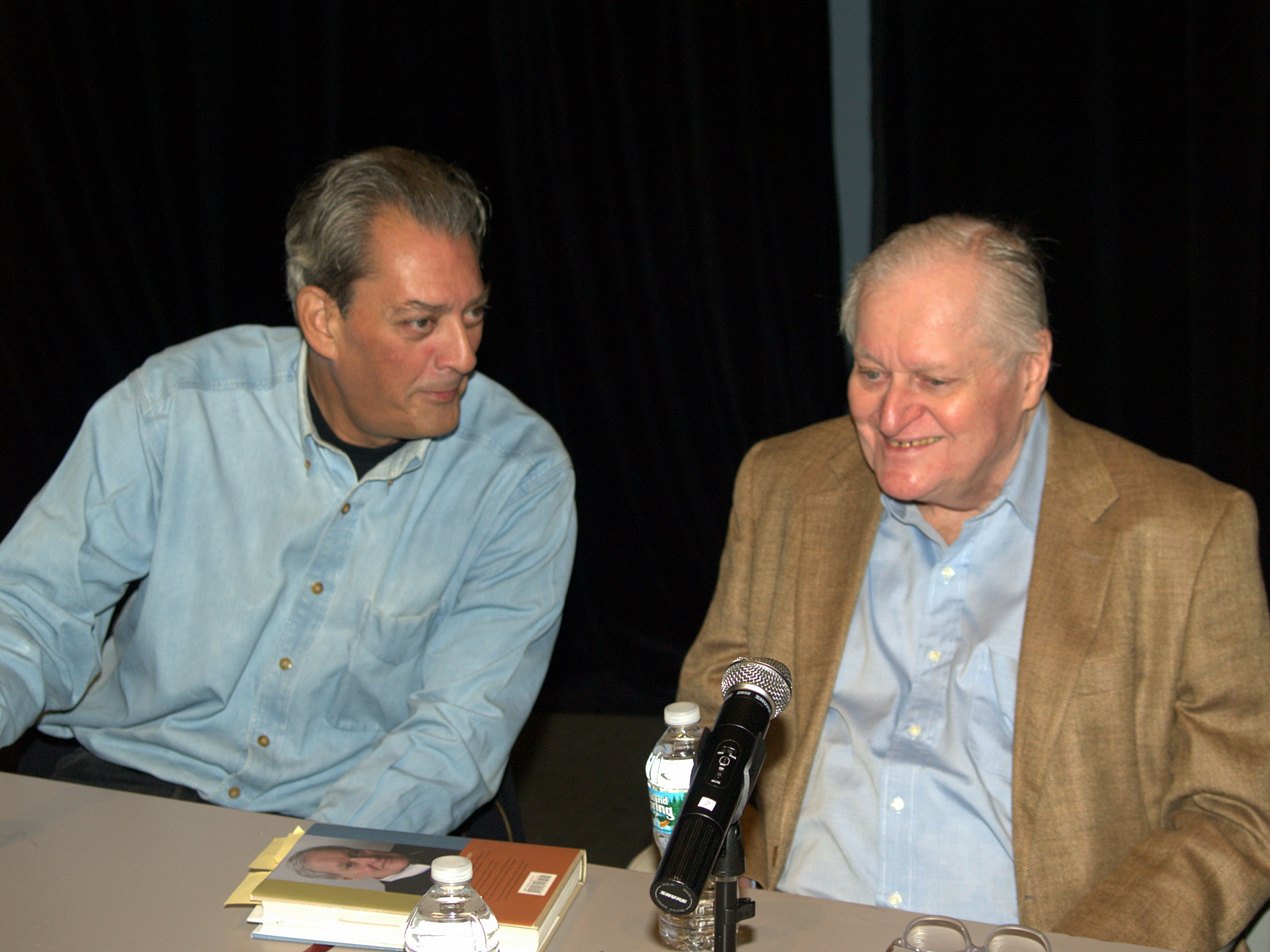
Ashbery speaking on a panel with previous "BoBi" Award winner Paul Auster

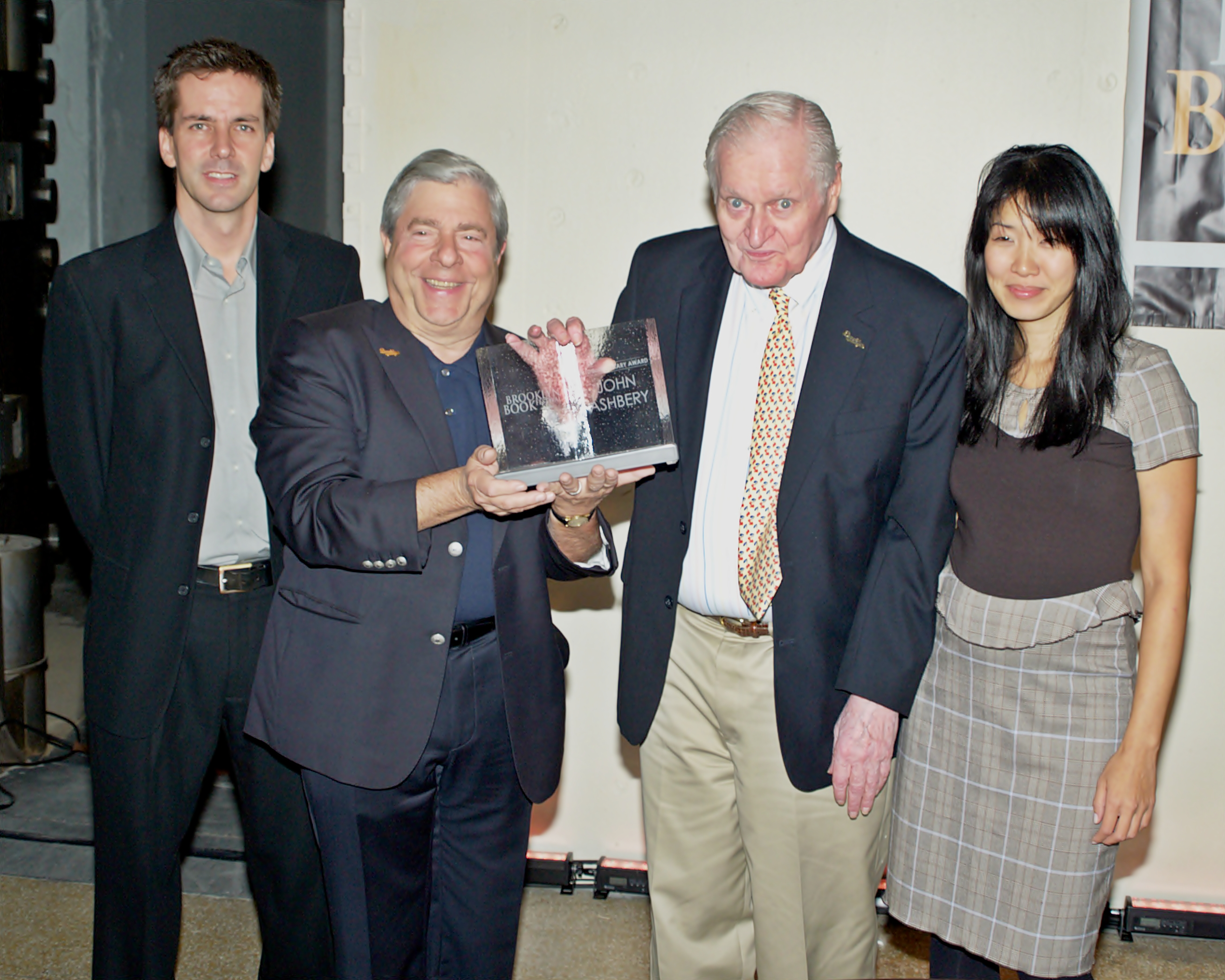
Ashbery accepts the "BoBi" Award. From left to right: Johnny Temple, Marty Markowitz, Ashbery, and Tina Chang.

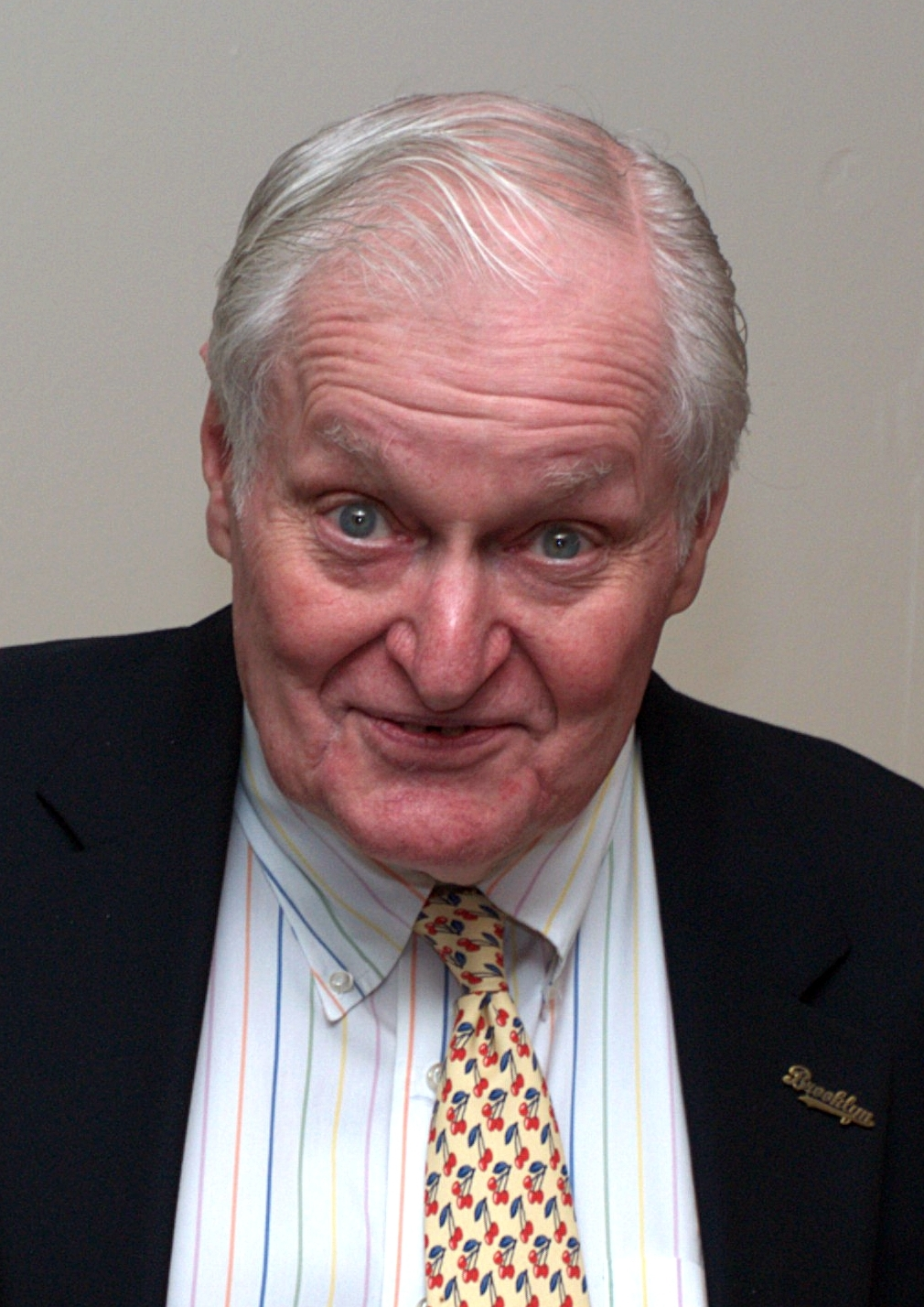
Close-up of Ashbery receiving the award

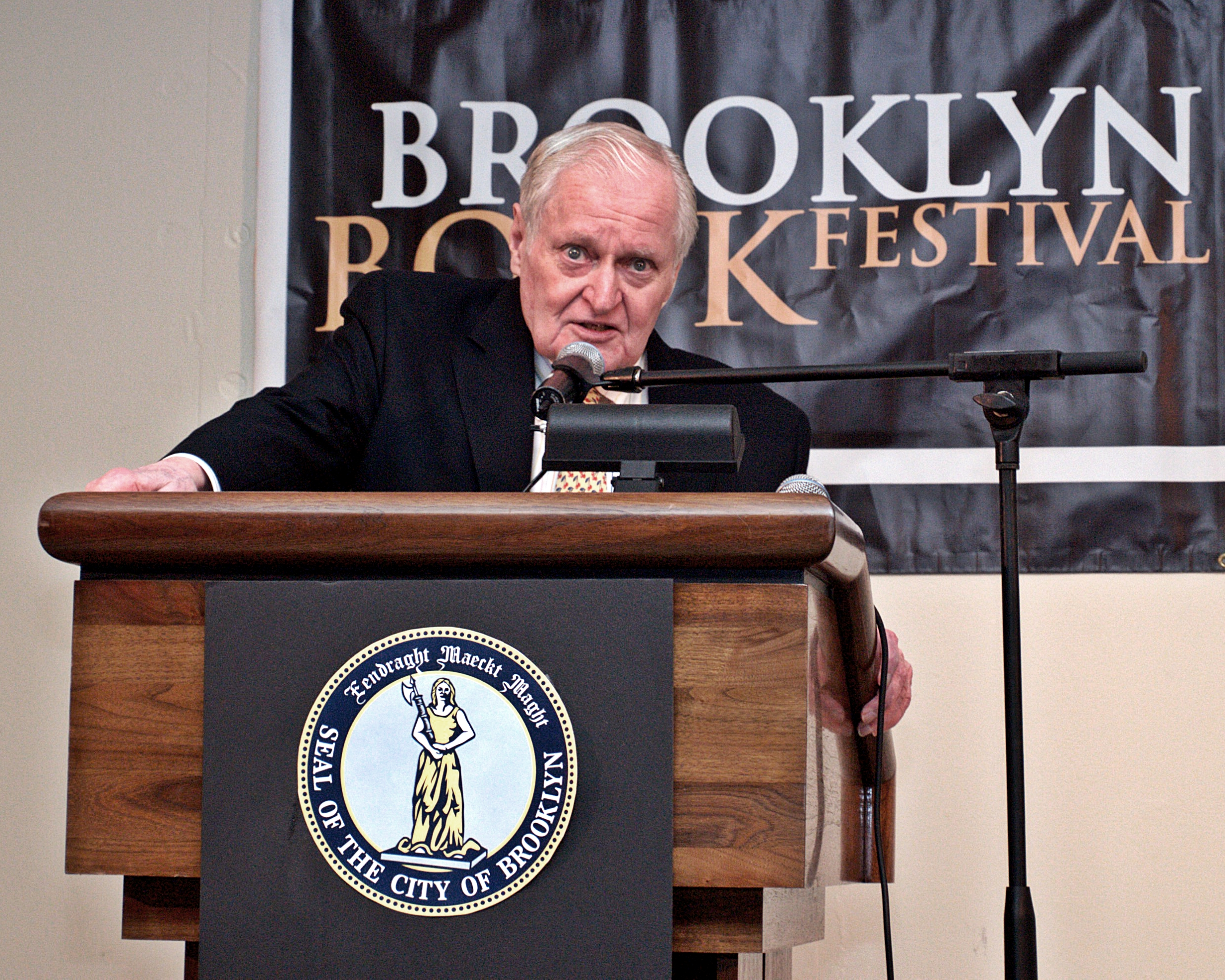
Ashbery speaking at a lectern

=== Bollingen Prize ===
First awarded in 1949, the Bollingen Prize has been announced biennially since 1963. It is awarded by the Yale University Library to a living American poet, or poets, in recognition of either "the best collection published in that period, or for a body of poetry written over several years." Both Ashbery and Fred Chappell received the Bollingen Prize in 1985. Each poet received $2,500. They were chosen by a jury that included Annie Dillard, Richard Howard, and Louis D. Rubin Jr.

According to some recent sources, including the Flow Chart Foundation and the Poetry Foundation website's biography of Ashbery, he received the Bollingen Prize for his collection A Wave. However, The Yale University Library Gazette did not mention A Wave in its announcement and instead cited the two poets "for their body of work." Contemporaneous sources reporting on the Bollingen announcement, such as The New York Times and Poetry magazine, also described it as a cumulative award recognizing his work published to date and did not mention A Wave.

=== Common Wealth Award for Literature ===
The Common Wealth Award of Distinguished Service recognizes accomplished individuals in eight fields: dramatic arts, government, invention, literature, mass communications, public service, science, and sociology. Winners receive a cash prize and a trophy. The awards are funded by the Common Wealth Trust, established by the estate of Ralph Hayes. The award is currently managed by PNC Financial Services, but was overseen by the Bank of Delaware when Ashbery won. The literature category is judged and administered by the Modern Language Association (MLA).

Ashbery received the Common Wealth Award in Literature on December 28, 1986, at the MLA's annual convention in New York City. The cash prize that year was $11,000. Ashbery also received an engraved trophy. The MLA jury that selected Ashbery included Walter Scott Achtert, Phyllis Franklin, Winfred P. Lehmann, J. Hillis Miller, and Barbara Herrnstein Smith.

=== French honors ===
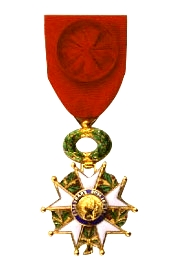
Officer Cross of the
French Legion of Honour

Ashbery had a deep, lifelong engagement with French poetry and received several notable French honors. In 1993, the French Ministry of Culture inducted him as a Knight of the Order of Arts and Letters (Chevalier de l'Ordre des Arts et des Lettres). The Minister of Culture, Jack Lang, bestowed the honor to Ashbery in Paris at the home of Harry Mathews. He received the Silver Medal of the City of Paris in 1996, coinciding with the publication of Quelqu'un que vous avez déjà vu (Someone You Have Seen Before), a translation of his selected poetry into French by Anne Talvaz and Pierre Martory. In 2002, he was inducted into the Legion of Honour as an Officer (Officier).

=== Grand Prix des Biennales Internationales de Poésie ===
In 1996, Ashbery won the Grand Prix des Biennales Internationales de Poésie (the "Grand Prize of the International Poetry Biennials") from the Maison Internationale de la Poésie (the "International House of Poetry") in Brussels, Belgium. Ashbery was the first English-language poet to receive the prize, which is given once every two years to "crown the published work of a living poet, whatever his nationality may be." It was accompanied by a cash prize of 150,000 Belgian francs, which at the time was worth about US$5,000.

=== Hadada Award ===
The Paris Review's Hadada Award—named for the hadada ibis, an African bird that was a favorite of founding editor George Plimpton—is presented to "a distinguished member of the writing community who has made a strong and unique contribution to literature" at the magazine's annual Spring Revel. Ashbey received the prize in 2009.

=== Horst Bienek Prize for Poetry ===
The Horst Bienek Prize for Poetry (Horst-Bienek-Preis für Lyrik) is an international literary award of the Bavarian Academy of Fine Arts (Bayerische Akademie der Schönen Künste) in Munich, Germany. It is named for Horst Bienek, a German poet whose estate provided for the award following his death on December 7, 1990. It is presented on a day close to the anniversary of Bienek's death, initially on an annual basis but biannually since 2003. The award comes with a cash prize, which as of 2015 was set at €10,000. Ashbery received the inaugural Horst Bienek Prize in December 1991.

=== National Arts Club Medal of Honor for Literary Achievement ===
Founded in New York in 1898, the National Arts Club is a private organization with a mission "to stimulate, foster, and promote public interest in the arts and to educate the American people in the fine arts." Since 1968, the National Arts Club has presented its Medal of Honor for Literary Achievement at an annual gala. Ashbery received the Medal of Honor on May 5, 2014, at an event with tributes by the Poetry Foundation's then-president Robert Polito, Irish poet Paul Muldoon, author Jed Perl, and the rock musician and author Patti Smith.

=== National Book Foundation Medal for Distinguished Contribution to American Letters ===
External videos
- "2011 National Book Awards Ceremony" (1:54:59) November 16, 2011 – Via C-SPAN John Lithgow introduces Ann Lauterbach at 56:25; Lauterbach introduces Ashbery at 57:39; Ashbery's acceptance speech begins at 1:05:09 until about 1:14:30.

Since 1988, the National Book Foundation has presented a lifetime achievement award called the Medal for Distinguished Contribution to American Letters. The winner is chosen by the foundation's board of directors and the medal is presented at the annual National Book Award ceremony. It comes with a $10,000 cash prize and is awarded to "a person who has enriched our literary heritage over a life of service, or a corpus of work."

The National Book Foundation announced in September 2011 that Ashbery won that year's Medal for Distinguished Contribution. He received the prize at the 62nd National Book Awards Ceremony and Benefit Dinner on November 16, 2011, at the high-end venue Cipriani Wall Street in the Financial District of Manhattan. The event was hosted by actor John Lithgow, who had previously awarded Ashbery the Harvard Arts Medal in 2009. Ann Lauterbach provided an introduction for Ashbery, during which she briefly alluded to the Occupy Wall Street protests happening nearby. In his acceptance speech, Ashbery described the "pleasure of writing" and his lifelong interest in "difficult" poetry.

=== National Humanities Medal ===
National Humanities Medal
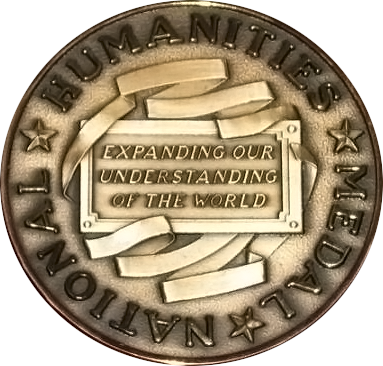
(obverse side shown)

Ashbery at the 2011 National Medals of Arts and Humanities Ceremony (1:06)
Video (originally live streamed) of Barack Obama awarding a 2011 National Humanities Medal to Ashbery at a ceremony in the East Room of the White House on February 13, 2012.

The National Humanities Medal is an annual award of the United States federal government honoring "individuals or groups whose work has deepened the nation's understanding of the humanities and broadened our citizens' engagement with history, literature, languages, philosophy, and other humanities subjects." Up to 12 National Humanities Medals can be awarded each year, with recipients selected by the president in consultation with the National Endowment for the Humanities (NEH).

Ashbery was one of eight recipients of the 2011 National Humanities Medal, who were announced alongside seven recipients of the National Medal of Arts on February 10, 2012. Another poet, Rita Dove, received a National Medal of Arts that same year. In a summary of Ashbery's career and accomplishments at NEH.gov, Steve Moyer wrote:

Contemporary American poetry is a big house. Formalists, composers of free verse, language poets, and combinations of the three, as well as latter-day confessional poets and descendants of movements such as the Black Mountain School and spoken word vie for the attention of audiences that some say is declining and becoming increasingly specialized. John Ashbery, over a writing career that spans nearly six decades, has been associated with the New York School, seen as a dean of language poets, and identified as a surrealist and as a poet influenced by music and painting. However he has been categorized by critics, he maintains an enthusiastic general audience that has not waned since W. H. Auden selected Some Trees for the Yale Younger Poets Prize in 1956.

President Barack Obama awarded the medals in a ceremony at the East Room of the White House on February 13, 2012. In his opening remarks, Obama quoted from Emily Dickinson's poem "I dwell in possibility". First Lady Michelle Obama was also present. Writing about the event for the Poetry Society of America, Darrel Alejandro Holnes remarked that Ashbery appeared "cordial and visibly joyful" as he received his medal.

=== New York honors ===
Ashbery received several awards from public and nonprofit entities in New York.

==== New York State Poet ====
Ashbery served as New York State's seventh Poet Laureate (officially the "State Poet") from 2001 to 2003. The position was created by state statute in 1985, with term lengths of two years. New York State Poets receive the Walt Whitman Citation of Merit and a $10,000 honorarium. The New York State Writers Institute at the University at Albany, SUNY selected Ashbery for the award, which was conferred on January 22, 2001. Kurt Vonnegut became the New York State Author at the same ceremony, receiving the Edith Wharton Citation of Merit for Fiction Writers.

==== Columbia County Special Citation for Literature ====
In 2001, the Columbia County Council on the Arts gave the poet a Special Citation for Literature. He had lived in the county since 1978, when he purchased a home in Hudson.

==== New York City honors ====
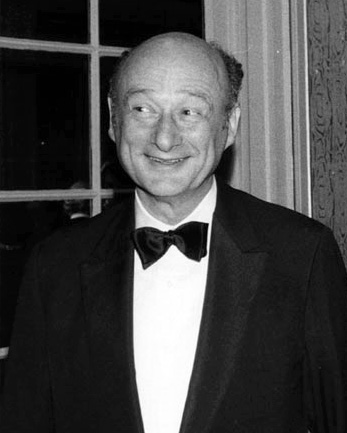
Koch in 1977

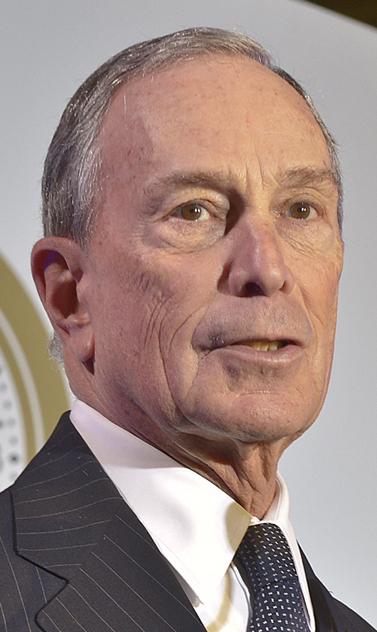
Bloomberg in 2013

Ashbery received awards from the government of New York City under Mayors Ed Koch and Michael Bloomberg.

In 1983, he received a Mayor's Award of Honor for Arts and Culture from the city's Department of Cultural Affairs. Mayor's Awards for Arts and Culture were given most years between 1976 and 1994 and were revived in 2004. Ashbery accepted the award in a ceremony at Gracie Mansion, presented by Mayor Ed Koch, to celebrate the 50th anniversary of the Academy of American Poets. Other recipients of the award that year were Merce Cunningham, Brendan Gill, Alberta Hunter, David Katz, LuEsther Mertz, Tina Ramirez, Vivian Robinson, Arthur Ross, Rudolf Serkin, Maureen Stapleton, and Sol Steinberg.

In 2006, the New York City Council proclaimed April 7 "John Ashbery Day", in conjunction with a three-day John Ashbery Festival held at The New School.

In 2013, Ashbery was announced as the winner in the poetry category of the second annual NYC Literary Honors, established under Mayor Michael Bloomberg's administration. Other honorees that year included Toni Morrison, Calvin Trillin, Jules Feiffer, Morton L. Janklow, and Lynn Nesbit. The awards were presented during a ceremony at Gracie Mansion, with Ashbery and the other winners giving selected readings. The honorees were selected by Cultural Affairs Commissioner Kate D. Levin, New York City Schools Chancellor Dennis Walcott, and heads of the New York Public Library system.

==== New York Public Library and library organizations ====
On April 22, 1977, Ashbery received the annual literary award of the nonprofit Friends of the Library organization in Rochester, his birthplace. It was his first lifetime achievement award.

In 1984, he received the New York Public Library's Literary Lion award. The library launched the award—more recently called the Library Lion—in 1981. These awards, given in the form of a lion-head medallion, have been conferred annually at black tie fundraising events benefitting the library. Alongside Ashbery there were 21 other writers who received the award on November 12, 1984, during an event that raised $250,000.

Ashbery was inducted into the New York State Writers Hall of Fame in 2011, the institution's second year, at the Empire State Book Festival Gala in Albany. The Hall of Fame is a project of the New York Library Association and the New York Council for the Humanities. Ashbery and Paula Fox were the two living writers to join the Hall of Fame that year; the others were Willa Cather, Julia de Burgos, Ralph Ellison, Lorraine Hansberry, Madeleine L'Engle, Herman Melville, and Dorothy Parker.

=== Premio Napoli Special Prize ===
The Premio Napoli ("Naples Prize") is an annual Italian literary award recognizing Italian and international literature. The prize has been administered by the Fondazione Premio Napoli ("Naples Prize Foundation") since 1960, when it was established by the government of Italy.

External videos
- "Il Premio Napoli a New York: John Ashbery" (7:51) December 10, 2009 – Via YouTube Ashbery accepts the Premio Napoli Special Prize and reads his 1955 poem "And You Know".

In 2009, the Fondazione Premio Napoli recognized Ashbery with a special prize for career achievement in world literature. The prize also recognized the recent publication of Un mondo che non può essere migliore: Poesie scelte 1956–2007, an Italian-language collection of selected poems translated by Moira Egan, Damiano Abeni, and Joseph Harrison. The special prize for Italian literature went to Antonio Moresco. As part of the Premio Napoli events in October, Ashbery called in from New York for a conversation with Moresco, presented for a live audience at the Royal Palace of Naples and broadcast on the radio by RAI.

In December, Ashbery received the award in-person during a ceremony hosted by the Italian Academy at Columbia University. Attendees included Fondazione Napoli president Silvio Perrella and several members of the Columbia faculty. Charles Simic, who had received the main international Premio Napoli that year, presented Ashbery with a plaque. During his acceptance speech Ashbery read from "And You Know", a poem written about his first travels through Europe that recounts his impressions of Naples.

=== Raymond Roussel Society Medal ===
External videos
- "The Raymond Roussel Society Pays Tribute to John Ashbery" A playlist in six parts (1, 2, 3, 4, 5 6) June 14, 2017 – Via YouTube Several speakers discuss Roussel's legacy during an event at the Instituto Cervantes in New York. In part 6, artist Trevor Winkfield accepts the Raymond Roussel Society Medal on Ashbery's behalf.

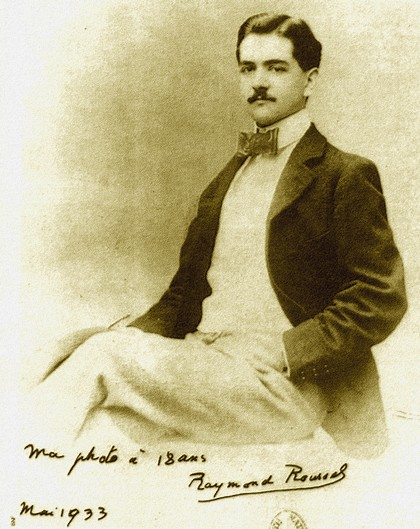
Raymond Roussel

As an admirer of avant-garde French writer Raymond Roussel (1877–1933), Ashbery was a founding member of the Raymond Roussel Society in 2016. The following June, he became the first recipient of the Raymond Roussel Society Medal for "rediscovering and spreading awareness of Raymond Roussel in the United States of America."

Joan Bofill-Amargós, president of the Raymond Roussel Society, designed the medal itself: a gold-plated silver medallion which, as a reference to an event from Roussel's life, contained a cookie in the shape of a five-pointed star inside. Ashbery's poor health did not permit him to leave his home, so Bofill-Amargós personally delivered it to him at his home in Hudson. The next day, Trevor Winkfield publicly accepted the medal on Ashbery's behalf during an event held at the Instituto Cervantes in New York.

=== Robert Creeley Award ===
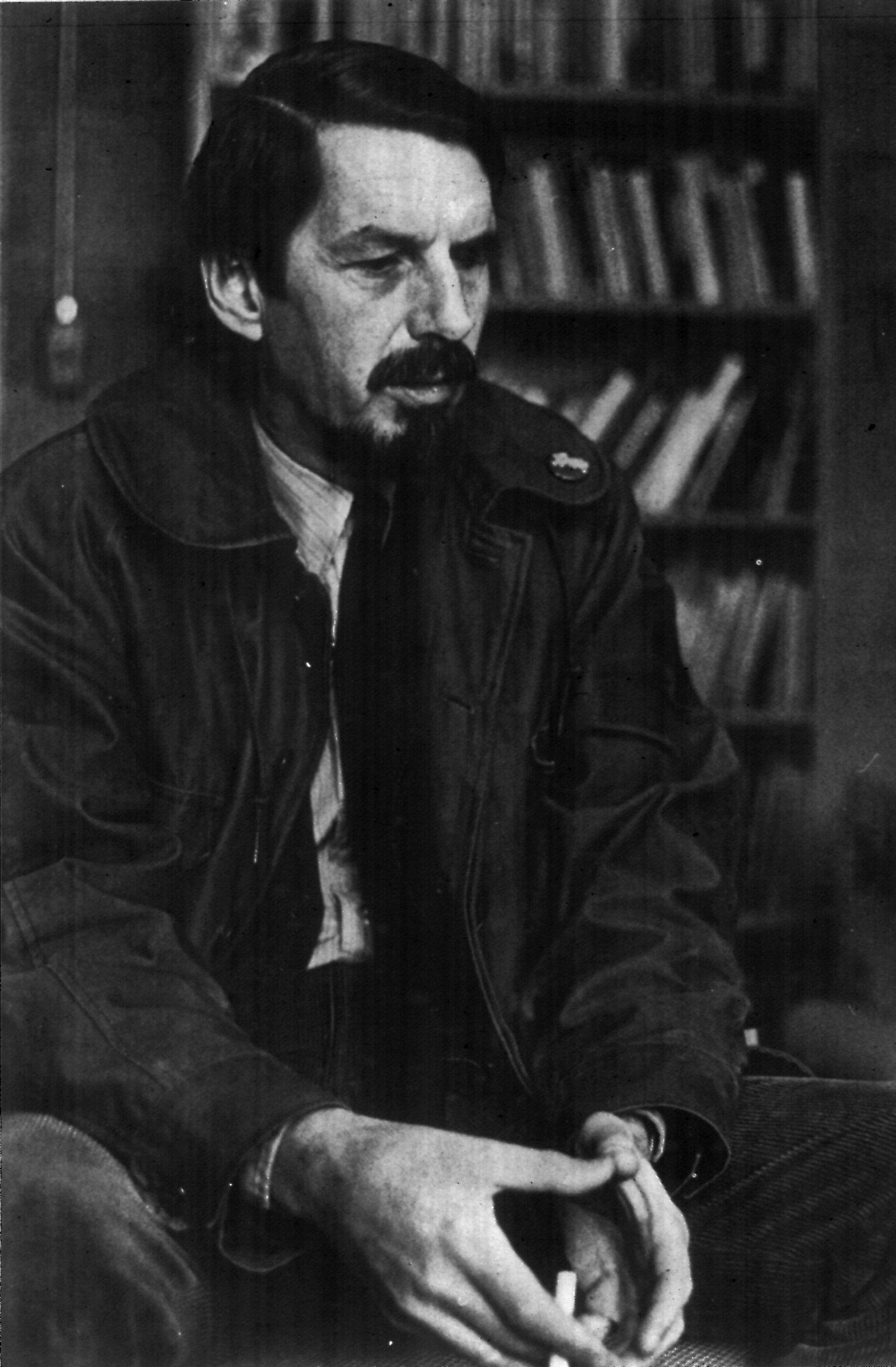
Creeley, 1970

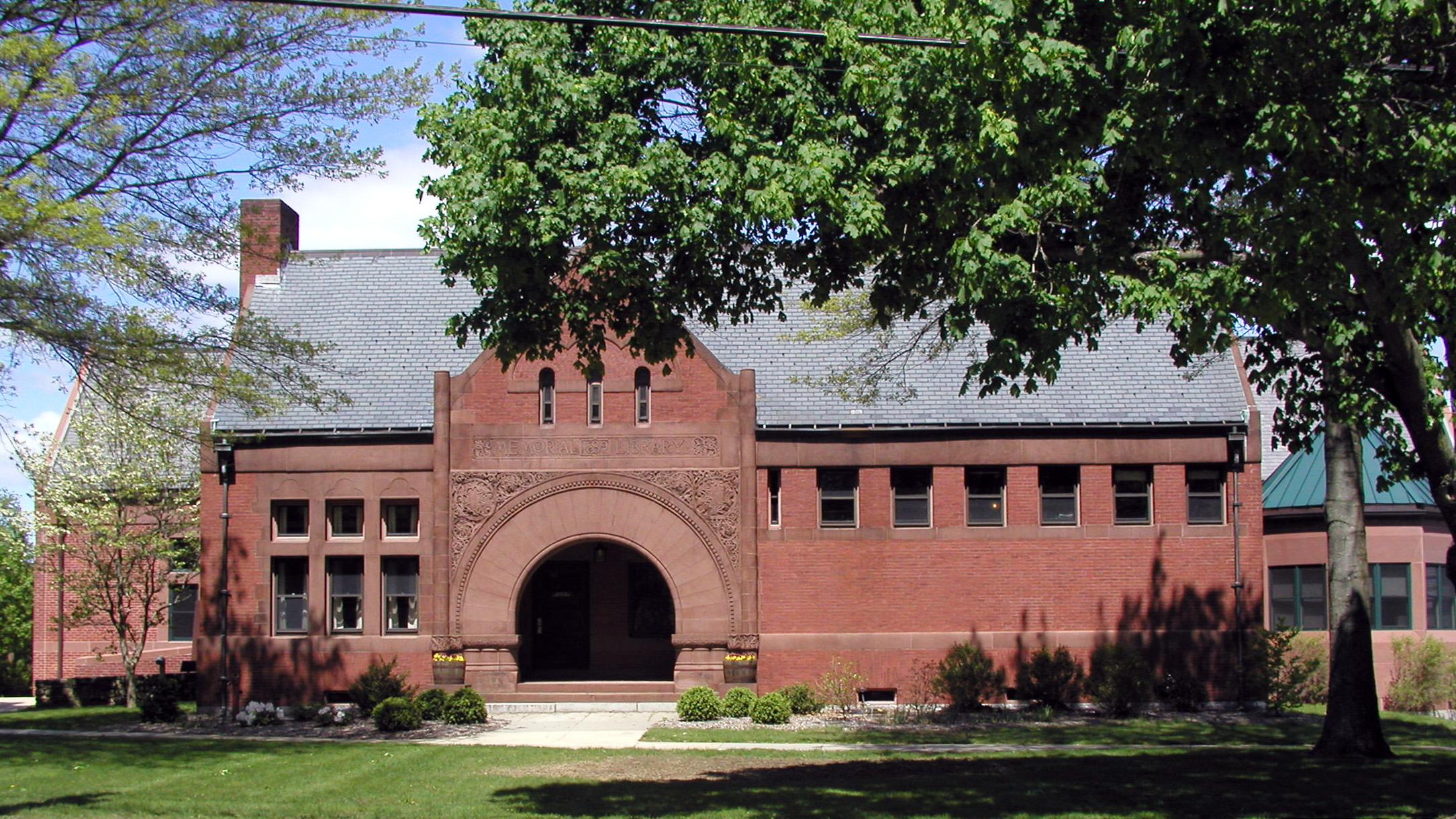
Acton Memorial Library, 2006

Named for poet Robert Creeley, the Robert Creeley Award benefitted institutions in Acton, Massachusetts, like its Memorial Library. Ashbery gave a reading there when he received the award in spring 2008.

The Robert Creeley Foundation was formed in 2001 in Acton, Massachusetts to benefit the town's local library, schools, and community at large. It was formed by poets Robert Clawson and Robert Creeley, the foundation's namesake and the first recipient of its Robert Creeley Award. The foundation presented the award every year to an "internationally renowned poet", who would be invited to Acton to offer free public readings, give presentations at local schools, and donate signed copies of their books to the collection of the Acton Memorial Library. Creeley and Ashbery had attended Harvard together and remained friends long afterward.

Ashbery won the Robert Creeley Award in spring 2008, three years after Creeley's death. The award was presented by Robert's widow Pen Creeley. He gave three poetry readings: the first at R. J. Grey Junior High School, another the following day at Acton-Boxborough Regional High School, and at the Memorial Library. More than 800 audience members, in total, attended these events. Local students Peter Boskey and Michael Bottari opened for Ashbery with readings of their original poems. They were the first winners of the foundation's Helen Creeley Student Poetry Prize, a contest open to submissions from area high schoolers and named for Robert's sister, who was also a poet.

=== Robert Frost Medal ===
The Robert Frost Medal
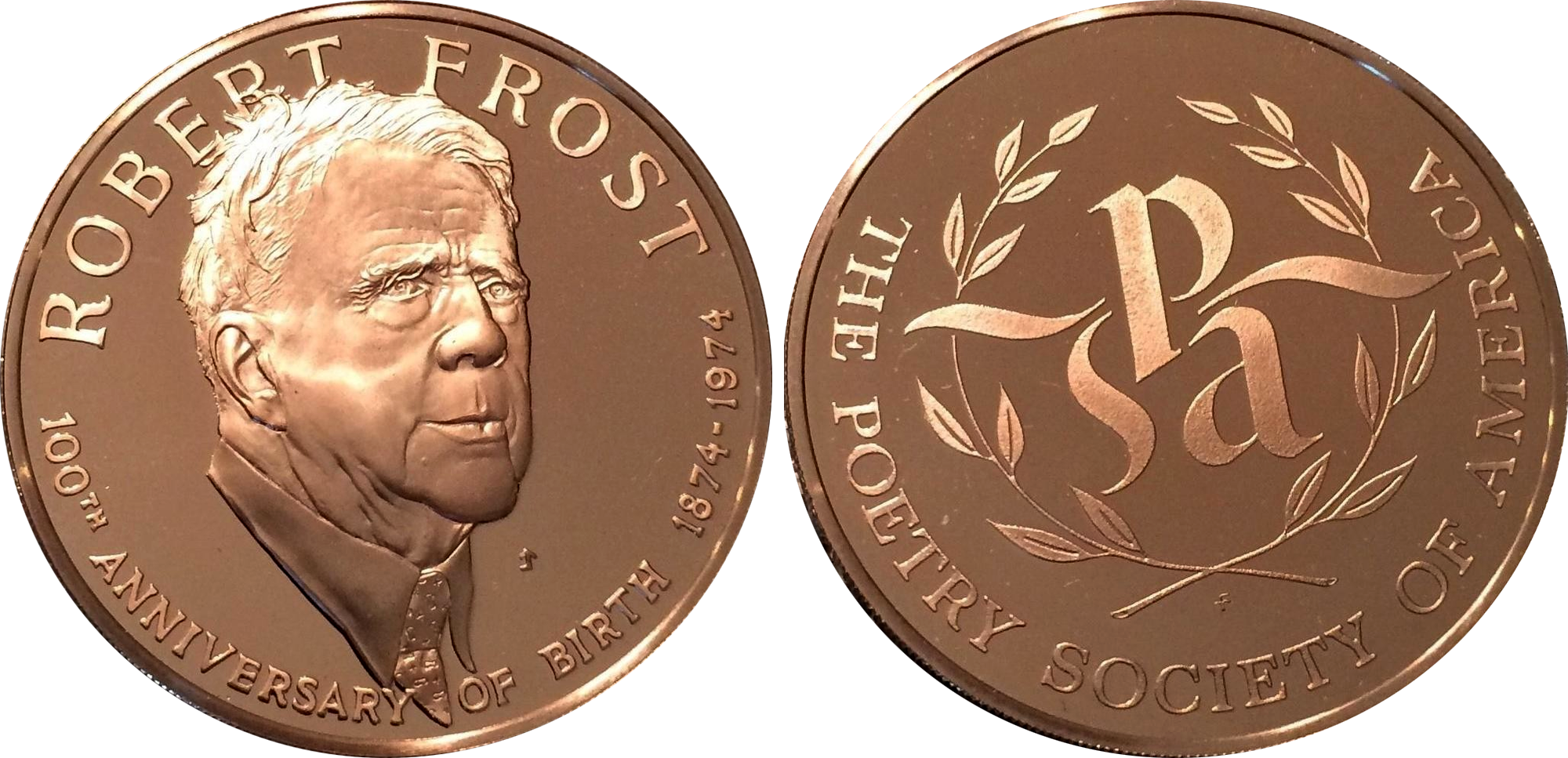
(obverse and reverse sides shown)

The Robert Frost Medal is a lifetime achievement award of the Poetry Society of America (PSA). Introduced in 1930 as the PSA's "Gold Medal", it was renamed after poet Robert Frost and turned into an annual award in 1984. Since 1995, the Frost Medal winner is expected to give a speech at the PSA's Annual Awards Ceremony known as the Robert Frost Lecture, which includes readings of their poetry.

Ashbery won the Frost Medal in 1995. As such, he delivered the first Frost Lecture. The text of his lecture was published for the first time in his 2004 collection Selected Prose.

=== Ruth Lilly Poetry Prize ===
The Ruth Lilly Poetry Prize was established in 1986 by philanthropist Ruth Lilly as an annual prize to a poet "whose lifetime accomplishments warrant extraordinary recognition." Throughout its history it has been among the most substantial cash prizes for a literary award in the United States; as of 2019, its value is $100,000. The prize was initially administered by the Modern Poetry Association and the American Council for the Arts and is currently administered by the Poetry Foundation. The Modern Poetry Association was also the publisher of Poetry magazine prior to the Poetry Foundation.

Ashbery was announced as the winner of the 1992 Ruth Lilly Poetry Prize on May 5. Poetry ran the announcement in its July issue. The prize money that year was $25,000, which he told The New York Times was "certainly welcome but hardly enough to quit my job and retire." However, he said the prestige "makes one feel better. It temporarily allays one's doubts about one's work that you think you've conquered but that eventually come creeping back."

=== Wallace Stevens Award ===
The Wallace Stevens Award is a lifetime achievement prize from the Academy of American Poets for "outstanding and proven mastery in the art of poetry." The award carries one of the largest cash prizes for a literary award, worth $100,000 as of 2019. Ashbery won the award in Fall 2001, receiving a cash prize of $150,000. The selection committee included Charles Bernstein, Susan Howe, Harryette Mullen, Geoffrey O'Brien, and Cole Swenson.

== Miscellaneous honors ==
In 2007, Ashbery was named the first "Poet Laureate of MTVU" (logo pictured).

The following are miscellaneous honors and distinctions which do not squarely fit into any of the other categories:

- In 1980, he was elected as a member of the American Academy of Arts and Letters.
- In 1983, he was elected as a member of the American Academy of Arts and Sciences.
- In 1988, he was elected as a chancellor of the Academy of American Poets. He retained the position until his term expired at the end of 1999, in the midst of a restructuring and the introduction of a new rotation schedule to help encourage greater diversity and less elitism in the organization.
- From April 6–8, 2006, The New School hosted a John Ashbery Festival featuring poetry readings and discussions. Ashbery gave a reading on the second day. The festival was organized by David Lehman. In the lead-up to the festival, Lehman also coordinated to have the New York City Council proclaim April 7 as John Ashbery Day. See the section on New York City honors above.
- Also in 2006, the University of Massachusetts Amherst dedicated its Juniper literary festival to the 50th anniversary of the publication of Some Trees.
- In August 2007, Ashbery was named the first "Poet Laureate of MTVU". His poetry featured in short promotional videos on the network and its website. He accepted the unpaid position because he saw it as an opportunity to "broaden the audience for poetry" without expending much effort on his part. As he told the New York Times, MTVU were "going to publicize my poetry and maybe people will get interested in it and other poets will benefit," which was "about as much work or responsibility as I would want." The position endured after Ashbery's tenure: the Iranian poet Simin Behbahani was named the second Poet Laureate of MTVU in October 2009.
- In October 2008, the nonprofit publisher Library of America issued Ashbery's Collected Poems 1956–1987 as volume 187 in its ongoing series of classic American literature, marking the first time it had published a volume of writing by a living poet.
- In October 2011, Ashbery was named an LGBT History Month Icon. Beginning in 2006, the organization Equality Forum dedicated each day in October to honor an LGBT individual who had "changed the world in some way". Ashbery was recognized on October 2, 2011.
- In November 2011, Ashbery was featured in the American LGBT culture magazine Out's 17th Annual Out100 list of 100 notable openly LGBT individuals.

== All honors ==
All honors received by Ashbery
Date	Work	Honor or award	Institution or publication	Location	Result	Ref.
Apr 3, 1952	John Ashbery; Co-recipient with Harvey Shapiro and Gray Burr	Discovery Prize	92nd Street Y and the Young Men's Hebrew Association	(New York (state)) New York, New York	Won	
Jun 3, 1955	John Ashbery	Fulbright Program Scholar (1955–56)	Bureau of Educational and Cultural Affairs (ECA) of the US State Department	(Washington, D.C.) Washington, D.C.	Accepted	
Jun 3, 1955	Some Trees	Yale Series of Younger Poets Prize	Yale University Press	New Haven, Connecticut	Won	
1956	John Ashbery	Fulbright Program Scholar (1956–57)	Bureau of Educational and Cultural Affairs (ECA) of the US State Department	(Washington, D.C.) Washington, D.C.	Extended	
Dec 2, 1956	Some Trees	New York Times "Outstanding Books of the Year" (year-end best-of)	The New York Times Book Review	(New York (state)) New York, New York	Listed	
1960	Two poems published in Big Table Vol. 1, No. 3 (1959): "How Much Longer Will I Be Able to Inhabit the Divine Sepulcher . . ."; "April Fool's Day"	Longview Foundation Award	Longview Foundation	(New York (state)) New York, New York	Won	
1960	John Ashbery	Grant	Poets' Foundation	(New York (state)) New York, New York	Received	
1962	John Ashbery	Grant	Ingram Merrill Foundation	(New York (state)) New York, New York	Selected	
Dec 1963	Five poems published in the June 1963 issue of Poetry: "A Blessing in Disguise"; "If the Birds Knew"; "Last Month"; "The Recent Past"; "Civilization and Its Discontents"	Harriet Monroe Memorial Prize	The Modern Poetry Association	Chicago, Illinois	Won	
1964	John Ashbery	Grant	Poets' Foundation	(New York (state)) New York, New York	Received	
Nov 1966	One poem published in the February 1966 issue of Poetry: "Fragment"	Union League Civic and Arts Foundation Poetry Prize	Modern Poetry Association and the Union League Club of Chicago	Chicago, Illinois	Won	
1967	John Ashbery	Guggenheim Fellowship	John Simon Guggenheim Memorial Foundation	(New York (state)) New York, New York	Selected	
Jan 31, 1967	Rivers and Mountains	National Book Committee	National Book Foundation	(New York (state)) New York, New York	Finalist	
Feb 1969	John Ashbery (for the poem "Spring Day")	Publication award	National Endowment for the Arts (NEA)	(Washington, D.C.) Washington, D.C.	Received	
Apr 9, 1969	John Ashbery	Arts and Letters Award in Literature	National Institute of Arts and Letters (now the American Academy of Arts and Letters)	(New York (state)) New York, New York	Won	
Dec 7, 1969	A Nest Full of Ninnies; Co-written with James Schuyler	New York Times "Outstanding Books of the Year" (year-end best-of)	The New York Times Book Review	(New York (state)) New York, New York	Listed	
1970	"Soonest Mended"	Best Poems of 1969: Borestone Mountain Poetry Awards 1970	Borestone Mountain Poetry Awards	Palo Alto, California	Anthologized	
Dec 6, 1970	The Double Dream of Spring	New York Times "Selected List From Books of the Year" (year-end best-of)	The New York Times Book Review	(New York (state)) New York, New York	Listed	
1972	John Ashbery	Grant	Ingram Merrill Foundation	(New York (state)) New York, New York	Selected	
1973	John Ashbery	Guggenheim Fellowship	John Simon Guggenheim Memorial Foundation	(New York (state)) New York, New York	Selected	
1973	Three Poems	Shelley Memorial Award	Poetry Society of America	(New York (state)) New York, New York	Won	
Nov 1974	Five poems published in Poetry, 1973–74: "As You Came from the Holy Land" (November 1973); "A Man of Words" (November); "Scheherazade" (November); "Grand Galop" (April 1974); "Self-Portrait in a Convex Mirror" (August)	Frank O'Hara Prize	The Modern Poetry Association	Chicago, Illinois	Won	
1976	John Ashbery and Elliott Carter (for Syringa)	Composer/Librettist grant	National Endowment for the Arts (NEA)	(Washington, D.C.) Washington, D.C.	Received	
Jan 8, 1976	Self-Portrait in a Convex Mirror	National Book Critics Circle Award for Poetry	National Book Critics Circle	(New York (state)) New York, New York	Won	
Apr 19, 1976	Self-Portrait in a Convex Mirror	National Book Award for Poetry	National Institute of Arts and Letters	(New York (state)) New York, New York	Won	
May 3, 1976	Self-Portrait in a Convex Mirror	Pulitzer Prize for Poetry	Columbia University	(New York (state)) New York, New York	Won	
Apr 1977	"All Kinds of Caresses"	The Pushcart Prize, II: Best of the Small Presses	Pushcart Prize – nominated by the Chicago Review	(New York (state)) Yonkers, New York	Anthologized	
Apr 22, 1977	John Ashbery (lifetime achievement)	Annual literary award	Friends of the Rochester Public Library	(New York (state)) Rochester, New York	Won	
Nov 1977	Four poems published in Poetry, 1977: "Syringa" (April); "Blue Sonata" (April); "The Ice-Cream Wars" (April); "Fantasia on 'The Nut-Brown Maid'" (August)	Levinson Prize	The Modern Poetry Association	Chicago, Illinois	Won	
Dec 4, 1977	Houseboat Days	New York Times "Selection of Noteworthy Titles" (year-end best-of)	The New York Times Book Review	(New York (state)) New York, New York	Listed	
1978	Houseboat Days	ALA Notable Book	American Library Association	Chicago, Illinois	Listed	
Jan 11, 1978	Houseboat Days	National Book Critics Circle Award for Poetry	National Book Critics Circle	(New York (state)) New York, New York	Finalist	
Dec 31, 1978	John Ashbery	Grant for playwright‐in‐residence program (1979–80 season)	Rockefeller Foundation	(New York (state)) New York, New York	Received	
Jun 1979	John Ashbery	Phi Beta Kappa Poet at Harvard	Phi Beta Kappa at Harvard	Cambridge, Massachusetts	Named	
Jun 1979	John Ashbery	Honorary Doctor of Letters (DLitt)	Southampton College, Long Island University	(New York (state)) New York, New York	Received	
Nov 1979	Seven poems published in the July 1979 issue of Poetry: "Late Echo"; "Train Rising Out of the Station"; "Not Only / But Also"; "Many Wagons Ago"; "The Sun"; "Five Pedantic Pieces"; "Flowering Death"	The English-Speaking Union Prize	Modern Poetry Association and the Junior Board of the English-Speaking Union, Chicago	Chicago, Illinois	Won	
May 21, 1980	John Ashbery	Member of the American Academy of Arts and Letters	American Academy of Arts and Letters	(New York (state)) New York, New York	Elected	
Jun 8, 1980	As We Know	New York Times "Books for Summer Reading" (mid-year best-of)	The New York Times Book Review	(New York (state)) New York, New York	Listed	
1982	Shadow Train	ALA Notable Book	American Library Association	Chicago, Illinois	Listed	
Feb 3, 1982	Shadow Train	National Book Award for Poetry (presented as the American Book Award for Poetry)	Association of American Publishers	(New York (state)) New York, New York	Finalist	
Nov 22, 1982	John Ashbery	Fellow of the Academy of American Poets	Academy of American Poets	(New York (state)) New York, New York	Selected	
1983	John Ashbery (lifetime achievement)	Charles Flint Kellogg Award in Arts and Letters	Bard College	(New York (state)) Annandale-on-Hudson, New York	Won	
May 1983	John Ashbery	Member of the American Academy of Arts and Sciences	American Academy of Arts and Sciences	Cambridge, Massachusetts	Elected	
Sep 1983	"A Wave"	Jerome J. Shestack Poetry Prize	The American Poetry Review	Philadelphia, Pennsylvania	Won	
Sep 22, 1983	John Ashbery (lifetime achievement)	New York City Mayor's Award of Honor for Arts and Culture	New York City Department of Cultural Affairs and Ed Koch (Mayor of New York City, 1978–1989)	(New York (state)) New York, New York	Won	
1984	John Ashbery (lifetime achievement)	Heritage Award	Deerfield Academy Alumni Association	Deerfield, Massachusetts	Won	
Sep 23, 1984	A Wave	Los Angeles Times Book Prize	Los Angeles Times Book Review	Los Angeles, California	Nominated	
Nov 12, 1984	John Ashbery (lifetime achievement)	Literary Lion	New York Public Library	(New York (state)) New York, New York	Won	
Dec 10, 1984	A Wave	National Book Critics Circle Award for Poetry	National Book Critics Circle	(New York (state)) New York, New York	Finalist	
1985	John Ashbery	Wallace Stevens fellowship	Yale University – Timothy Dwight College	New Haven, Connecticut	Appointed	
1985	John Ashbery (lifetime achievement)	Poet of the Year	Pasadena City College	Pasadena, California	Won	
Jan 15, 1985	John Ashbery (for his body of work) (Co-recipient with Fred Chappell)	Bollingen Prize	Yale University Library – Beinecke Rare Book & Manuscript Library	New Haven, Connecticut	Won	
Jun 18, 1985	John Ashbery	MacArthur Fellow	MacArthur Foundation	Chicago, Illinois	Selected	
Oct 17, 1985	A Wave	Lenore Marshall Poetry Prize	The Nation	(New York (state)) New York, New York	Won	
Jun 1, 1986	Selected Poems	New York Times "Books for Vacation Reading" (mid-year best-of)	The New York Times Book Review	(New York (state)) New York, New York	Listed	
Oct 26, 1986	Selected Poems	Los Angeles Times Book Prize	Los Angeles Times Book Review	Los Angeles, California	Nominated	
Dec 28, 1986	John Ashbery (lifetime achievement)	Common Wealth Award of Distinguished Service in Literature	The Modern Language Association, Common Wealth Trust, and Bank of Delaware	(New York (state)) New York, New York	Won	
1987	John Ashbery (lifetime achievement)	Golden Plate Award	American Academy of Achievement	(Washington, D.C.) Washington, D.C.	Won	
Dec 7, 1987	April Galleons	National Book Critics Circle Award for Poetry	National Book Critics Circle	(New York (state)) New York, New York	Finalist	
1988	John Ashbery	Chancellor of the Academy of American Poets (1988–1999)	Academy of American Poets	(New York (state)) New York, New York	Appointed	
Sep 1988	"One Coat of Paint"	The Best American Poetry 1988	The Best American Poetry series – selected by himself	(New York (state)) New York, New York	Anthologized	
Jun 5, 1988	April Galleons	New York Times "Books for Vacation Reading" (mid-year best-of)	The New York Times Book Review	(New York (state)) New York, New York	Listed	
Dec 4, 1988	April Galleons	New York Times "Notable Books of the Year" (year-end best-of)	The New York Times Book Review	(New York (state)) New York, New York	Listed	
May 1989	John Ashbery (lifetime achievement)	Creative Arts Medal in Poetry	Brandeis University	Waltham, Massachusetts	Won	
Sep 1989	"Meanwhile. . . ."	The Best American Poetry 1989	The Best American Poetry series – selected by Donald Hall	(New York (state)) New York, New York	Anthologized	
Sep 1990	"Notes from the Air"	The Best American Poetry 1990	The Best American Poetry series – selected by Jorie Graham	(New York (state)) New York, New York	Anthologized	
Sep 1991	"Of Dreams and Dreaming"	The Best American Poetry 1991	The Best American Poetry series – selected by Mark Strand	(New York (state)) New York, New York	Anthologized	
Dec 1991	John Ashbery (lifetime achievement)	Horst Bienek Prize for Poetry (Horst-Bienek-Preis für Lyrik )	Bavarian Academy of Fine Arts (Bayerische Akademie der Schönen Künste)	Munich, Germany	Won	
Dec 1, 1991	Flow Chart	New York Times "Notable Books of the Year" (year-end best-of)	The New York Times Book Review	(New York (state)) New York, New York	Listed	
1992	John Ashbery (lifetime achievement)	Antonio Feltrinelli International Prize	Accademia dei Lincei	Rome, Italy	Won	
Sep 1992	"Poem at the New Year"	The Best American Poetry 1992	The Best American Poetry series – selected by Charles Simic	(New York (state)) New York, New York	Anthologized	
May 5, 1992	John Ashbery (lifetime achievement)	Ruth Lilly Poetry Prize	The Modern Poetry Association (now the Poetry Foundation)	Chicago, Illinois	Won	
1993	John Ashbery (lifetime achievement)	Knight of the Order of Arts and Letters (Chevalier de l'Ordre des Arts et des Lettres)	French Ministry of Culture	Paris, France	Inducted	
Sep 1993	"Baked Alaska"	The Best American Poetry 1993	The Best American Poetry series – selected by Louise Glück	(New York (state)) New York, New York	Anthologized	
Apr 13, 1993	Hotel Lautréamont	Pulitzer Prize for Poetry	Columbia University	(New York (state)) New York, New York	Finalist	
1994	John Ashbery	Honorary Doctor of Letters (DLitt)	University of Rochester	(New York (state)) New York, New York	Received	
Sep 1994	"Myrtle"	The Best American Poetry 1994	The Best American Poetry series – selected by A. R. Ammons	(New York (state)) New York, New York	Anthologized	
Dec 4, 1994	And the Stars Were Shining	New York Times "Notable Books of the Year" (year-end best-of)	The New York Times Book Review	(New York (state)) New York, New York	Listed	
1995	John Ashbery (lifetime achievement)	Robert Frost Medal	Poetry Society of America	(New York (state)) New York, New York	Won	
May 1995	Fifteen poems published in the January–February 1995 issue of The American Poetry Review ("Operators Are Standing By" & Other Poems)	Jerome J. Shestack Poetry Prize	The American Poetry Review	Philadelphia, Pennsylvania	Won	
1996	John Ashbery (lifetime achievement)	Grand Prix des Biennales Internationales de Poésie	Maison Internationale de la Poésie	Brussels, Belgium	Won	
1996	John Ashbery (lifetime achievement)	Silver Medal of the City of Paris	Jean Tiberi (Mayor of Paris, 1995–2001)	Paris, France	Won	
May 21, 1997	John Ashbery (lifetime achievement)	Gold Medal for Poetry	American Academy of Arts and Letters	(New York (state)) New York, New York	Won	
Sep 1997	"The Problem of Anxiety"	The Best American Poetry 1997	The Best American Poetry series – selected by James Tate	(New York (state)) New York, New York	Anthologized	
1998	The Mooring of Starting Out: The First Five Books of Poetry; Co-recipient with Frank Bidart for his book Desire	The Bingham Poetry Prize	Boston Book Review	Cambridge, Massachusetts	Won	
1998	Three Poems: "Baked Alaska"; "Myrtle"; "The Problem of Anxiety"	The Best of the Best American Poetry 1988–1997	The Best American Poetry series – selected by Harold Bloom	(New York (state)) New York, New York	Anthologized	
Sep 1998	"Wakefulness"	The Best American Poetry 1998	The Best American Poetry series – selected by John Hollander	(New York (state)) New York, New York	Anthologized	
May 31, 1998	The Mooring of Starting Out: The First Five Books of Poetry	New York Times "Vacation Reading" (mid-year best-of)	The New York Times Book Review	(New York (state)) New York, New York	Listed	
Dec 6, 1998	The Mooring of Starting Out: The First Five Books of Poetry	New York Times "Notable Books of 1998" (year-end best-of)	The New York Times Book Review	(New York (state)) New York, New York	Listed	
2001	John Ashbery (lifetime achievement)	Special Citation for Literature	Columbia County Council on the Arts	(New York (state)) Columbia County, New York	Won	
Sep 2001	"Crossroads in the Past"	The Best American Poetry 2001	The Best American Poetry series – selected by Robert Hass	(New York (state)) New York, New York	Anthologized	
Jan 22, 2001	John Ashbery (lifetime achievement)	Walt Whitman Citation of Merit	The New York State Writers Institute	(New York (state)) Albany, New York	Won	
Jan 22, 2001	John Ashbery	State Poet of New York (Poet Laureate), 2001–2003	George Pataki (Governor of New York, 1995–2006)	(New York (state)) Albany, New York	Appointed	
Jun 2001	John Ashbery (lifetime achievement)	Signet Society Medal for Achievement in the Arts	The Signet Society of Harvard University	Cambridge, Massachusetts	Won	
Jun 7, 2001	John Ashbery	Honorary Doctor of Letters (DLitt)	Harvard University	Cambridge, Massachusetts	Received	
Fall 2001	John Ashbery (lifetime achievement)	Wallace Stevens Award	Academy of American Poets	(New York (state)) New York, New York	Won	
2002	John Ashbery (lifetime achievement)	Officer of the Legion of Honour (Officier de la Légion d'honneur)	France	Paris, France	Inducted	
2002	Your Name Here	Lenore Marshall Poetry Prize	The Nation and the Academy of American Poets	(New York (state)) New York, New York	Finalist	
Sep 2002	"The Pearl Fishers"	The Best American Poetry 2002	The Best American Poetry series – selected by Robert Creeley	(New York (state)) New York, New York	Anthologized	
May 22, 2003	John Ashbery	Honorary Doctor of Letters (DLitt)	Pace University	(New York (state)) New York, New York	Received	
Sep 2004	"Wolf Ridge"	The Best American Poetry 2004	The Best American Poetry series – selected by Lyn Hejinian	(New York (state)) New York, New York	Anthologized	
Sep 2005	"In Dearest, Deepest Winter"	The Best American Poetry 2005	The Best American Poetry series – selected by Paul Muldoon	(New York (state)) New York, New York	Anthologized	
Oct 12, 2005	Where Shall I Wander	National Book Award for Poetry	National Book Foundation	(New York (state)) New York, New York	Finalist	
2006	John Ashbery	Honorary poet of the Signet Society Annual Dinner	The Signet Society of Harvard University	Cambridge, Massachusetts	Selected	
2006	"All Kinds of Caresses"	The Pushcart Book of Poetry: The Best Poems From Three Decades of the Pushcart Prize	Joan Murray and the Pushcart Prize editors	(New York (state)) Wainscott, New York	Anthologized	
Apr 6–8, 2006	John Ashbery	John Ashbery Festival	The New School	(New York (state)) New York, New York	Observed	
Apr 7, 2006	John Ashbery	"John Ashbery Day" declared on April 7, 2006	New York City Council	(New York (state)) New York, New York	Observed	
Apr 28–29, 2006	John Ashbery	Juniper literary festival dedicated to 50th anniversary of the publication of Some Trees	University of Massachusetts Amherst	Amherst, Massachusetts	Observed	
Sep 2006	"A Worldly Country"	The Best American Poetry 2006	The Best American Poetry series – selected by Billy Collins	(New York (state)) New York, New York	Anthologized	
Sep 27, 2006	John Ashbery	Foreign member of the Accademia Nazionale dei Lincei	Accademia dei Lincei	Rome, Italy	Elected	
Aug 27, 2007	John Ashbery	Poet laureate of MTVU	MTV Networks	(New York (state)) New York, New York	Selected	
Oct 2007	John Ashbery	"John Ashbery Tribute" issue	Conjunctions	(New York (state)) Annandale-on-Hudson, New York	Published	
2008	John Ashbery (lifetime achievement)	America Award in Literature	Contemporary Arts Educational Project, Inc. and Green Integer	Los Angeles, California	Won	
Mar 18, 2008	John Ashbery (lifetime achievement)	Robert Creeley Award	Robert Creeley Foundation	Acton, Massachusetts	Won	
May 26, 2008	John Ashbery	Honorary Doctor of Letters (DLitt)	Yale University	New Haven, Connecticut	Received	
Jun 2008	Six poems from Notes from the Air: Selected Later Poems: "Someone You Have Seen Before"; "Token Resistance"; "Chapter II, Book 35"; "Memories of Imperialism"; "The New Higher"; "Interesting People of Newfoundland"	The Griffin Poetry Prize 2008 Anthology: A Selection of the Shortlist	Griffin Trust for Excellence in Poetry – anthology edited by George Bowering	Toronto, Canada	Anthologized	
Jun 4, 2008	Notes from the Air: Selected Later Poems	The Griffin Poetry Prize (International category)	Griffin Trust for Excellence in Poetry	Toronto, Canada	Won	
Autumn 2008	The Landscapist; By Pierre Martory, translated from the French by Ashbery	Poetry Book Society Recommended Translation	Poetry Book Society	London, England	Won	
Sep 2008	"Pavane pour Helen Twelvetrees"	The Best American Poetry 2008	The Best American Poetry series – selected by Charles Wright	(New York (state)) New York, New York	Anthologized	
Sep 24, 2008	John Ashbery – for lifetime achievement and for Notes from the Air: Selected Later Poems	Ambassador Book Award	English-Speaking Union of the United States	(New York (state)) New York, New York	Won	
Oct 2008	Collected Poems 1956–1987: Library of America series, Vol. 187	First volume of collected writings by a living poet in the Library of America series	Library of America	(New York (state)) New York, New York	Published	
Jan 24, 2009	The Landscapist; By Pierre Martory, translated from the French by Ashbery	National Book Critics Circle Award for Poetry	National Book Critics Circle	(New York (state)) New York, New York	Finalist	
Apr 13, 2009	John Ashbery (lifetime achievement)	Hadada Award	The Paris Review	(New York (state)) New York, New York	Won	
Apr 30, 2009	John Ashbery (lifetime achievement)	Harvard Arts Medal	Harvard University Arts First festival	Cambridge, Massachusetts	Won	
Sep 2009	"They Knew What They Wanted"	The Best American Poetry 2009	The Best American Poetry series – selected by David Wagoner	(New York (state)) New York, New York	Anthologized	
Dec 5, 2009	John Ashbery (lifetime achievement)	Premio Napoli ("Naples Prize") – Special Prize	Fondazione Premio Napoli ("Naples Prize Foundation")	Naples, Italy	Won	
Dec 18, 2009	Planisphere	New York Times "Editors' Choice"	The New York Times Book Review	(New York (state)) New York, New York	Listed	
Sep 2010	"Alcove"	The Best American Poetry 2010	The Best American Poetry series – selected by Amy Gerstler	(New York (state)) New York, New York	Anthologized	
Sep 12, 2010	John Ashbery (lifetime achievement)	Best of Brooklyn ("BoBi") Award	Brooklyn Book Festival	(New York (state)) New York, New York	Won	
Dec 20, 2010	Ein weltgewandtes Land; Bilingual edition of A Worldly Country with German translations from multiple authors	SWR-Bestenliste (SWR Best List), December 2010	Südwestrundfunk (SWR)	Stuttgart, Germany	1st	
Apr 1, 2011	John Ashbery (lifetime achievement)	New York State Writers Hall of Fame	The New York Library Association and the New York Council for the Humanities	(New York (state)) Albany, New York	Inducted	
May 2011	John Ashbery (lifetime achievement)	Medal of Honor of the Center for French Civilization and Culture	New York University Center for French Civilization and Culture	(New York (state)) New York, New York	Won	
Jun 17 2011	Illuminations; By Arthur Rimbaud, translated from the French by Ashbery	New York Times "Editors' Choice"	The New York Times Book Review	(New York (state)) New York, New York	Listed	
Sep 2011	"Postlude and Prequel"	The Best American Poetry 2011	The Best American Poetry series – selected by Kevin Young	(New York (state)) New York, New York	Anthologized	
Oct 2, 2011	John Ashbery	LGBT History Month Icon	Equality Forum	New York, Pennsylvania	Selected	
Nov 14, 2011	John Ashbery	Out100	Out	(New York (state)) New York, New York	Listed	
Nov 16, 2011	John Ashbery (lifetime achievement)	Medal for Distinguished Contribution to American Letters	National Book Foundation	(New York (state)) New York, New York	Won	
Feb 13, 2012	John Ashbery (lifetime achievement)	National Humanities Medal, 2011	President Barack Obama and the National Endowment for the Humanities	(Washington, D.C.) Washington, D.C.	Won	
Summer 2012	Illuminations; By Arthur Rimbaud, translated from the French by Ashbery	ALA Notable Book	American Library Association	Chicago, Illinois	Listed	
Jul 7, 2012	Illuminations; By Arthur Rimbaud, translated from the French by Ashbery	Oxford–Weidenfeld Translation Prize	George Weidenfeld, Baron Weidenfeld and the New College, Queen's College, and St. Anne's College at the University of Oxford	Oxford, England	Finalist	
Aug 4, 2012	John Ashbery	Honorary Doctor of Letters (DLitt)	Middlebury College	Middlebury, Vermont	Received	
Apr 2013	"Wakefulness"	The Best of the Best American Poetry: 25th Anniversary Edition	The Best American Poetry series – selected by Robert Pinsky	(New York (state)) New York, New York	Anthologized	
Apr 23, 2013	John Ashbery (lifetime achievement)	NYC Literary Honors Award for Poetry	New York City government and Michael Bloomberg (Mayor of New York City, 2002–2013)	(New York (state)) New York, New York	Won	
May 24, 2013	Flussbild; Bilingual edition of Flow Chart with a German translation by Matthias Göritz and Uda Strätling	SWR-Bestenliste (SWR Best List), May 2013	Südwestrundfunk (SWR)	Stuttgart, Germany	10th	
Sep 2013	"Resisting Arrest"	The Best American Poetry 2013	The Best American Poetry series – selected by Denise Duhamel	(New York (state)) New York, New York	Anthologized	
Apr 2014	"Breezeway"	The Best American Poetry 2014	The Best American Poetry series – selected by Terrance Hayes	(New York (state)) New York, New York	Anthologized	
May 5, 2014	John Ashbery (lifetime achievement)	Medal of Honor for Literary Achievement	National Arts Club	(New York (state)) New York, New York	Won	
Jun 9, 2014	Collected French Translations: Poetry and Collected French Translations: Prose	Pegasus Award for Poetry Criticism	Poetry Foundation	Chicago, Illinois	Finalist	
Jun 12, 2017	John Ashbery (lifetime achievement)	Raymond Roussel Society Medal	Raymond Roussel Society	(New York (state)) New York, New York	Won	
Sep 5, 2017	"Commotion of the Birds"	The Best American Poetry 2017	The Best American Poetry series – selected by Natasha Trethewey	(New York (state)) New York, New York	Anthologized	

== Ashbery and the Nobel Prize in Literature ==
Nobel Prize medal

Ashbery never received the Nobel Prize in Literature, and a Nobel cannot be awarded posthumously. During his lifetime, he was a leading contender for the prize among American poets. (Note: Ashbery's obituary from the Associated Press noted he was "often mentioned as a Nobel candidate"; the scholar Solveig Daugaard claimed he was "repeatedly mentioned as runner-up candidate for the Nobel"; and according to his Poetry Foundation biography, he was "[c]onsidered for many years to be the leading U.S. candidate for the Nobel." The satirical newspaper The Onion even ran a Nobel-themed article with Ashbery as its subject, with the headline "Fucking Pathetic John Ashbery Actually Thinks He Has Shot at Nobel Prize in Literature This Year". The Guardian's Justine Jordan said the article "pok[ed] fun at every writer's perennial secret fantasy of getting That Call from the Academy.")

It is not known whether Ashbery was ever formally nominated for the prize or, if so, how many times he was nominated or how far he may have gotten in the process. Nomination records are kept secret for fifty years, after which time they may become available to the general public. Because he was last eligible for the prize in 2016, having died in 2017, records covering the full span of his eligibility will not be publicly available until at least 2067.

At the time of Ashbery's death, no writer had won the Nobel for literary work that is universally, uncontroversially recognized as "American poetry". (Note: American poet Louise Glück won the Nobel Prize in Literature in 2020, after Ashbery's death. Whether any American poet had previously won the Nobel depends on the definition of "American" (in the sense of "what is 'American poetry'?", not necessarily "who is an American?") and the definition of "poet" (in the sense of "what kinds of writing should be considered 'poetry'?").: "American": Three poets who were American citizens had received the Nobel Prize before Glück: T. S. Eliot, Czesław Miłosz, and Joseph Brodsky. However, each held dual citizenship and, more importantly, their poetry is not typically understood to be American poetry in terms of subject matter, themes, language, and other qualities. Eliot's status as an "American poet" is debatable. Though born in St. Louis, Missouri, he always had deep ties to England because his elite family was the Boston Brahmin branch of the upper-class Eliots of Britain. By the time he won the Nobel, he had been living in England for 30 years and had become a British citizen. David Orr said it "seems as reasonable to call him an English writer who was born in America as an American writer who lived in England." Similarly, Richard Gray wrote that Eliot "was and was not an American writer precisely because the confluence of cultures required him, he believed, to make a deliberate choice. He was an American by birth and an Englishman by force of will." Miłosz and Brodsky both became American citizens while living in exile from Poland and Russia, respectively, and their literary works were intimately tethered to the cultures and languages of their countries of origin. Neither writer identified as primarily American; Miłosz declared "I am a Lithuanian to whom it was not given to be a Lithuanian," while Brodsky said "I am Jewish—a Russian poet and an English essayist."; "Poet": When American singer-songwriter Bob Dylan won the Nobel in 2016, the committee officially recognized him "for having created new poetic expressions within the great American song tradition." The decision to grant the award to Dylan sparked debate about whether his lyrics could rightly be considered "poetry" or even "literature" at all. Critics also debated whether Dylan deserved or needed the Prize given his wealth, fame, and comparatively enormous audience: his listenership of millions far exceeds the typical readership of a Nobel laureate. In an article about the discussions surrounding Dylan's Nobel win, Orr quipped: "One would think, after all, poets might be put off by the idea that songwriters can be poet enough to win a prize in literature, when the implied relationship is so clearly a one-way street. (John Ashbery will be waiting a long time for his Grammy.)") Following Ashbery's death, New York Times critic Dwight Garner said the Nobel Committee's failure to recognize Ashbery ranked among its major oversights in American poetry, alongside its omissions of Elizabeth Bishop, Robert Frost, Wallace Stevens, Frank O'Hara, and John Berryman.

Though he never spoke of it publicly, there is some indication he contemplated winning the Nobel and hoped to achieve it. (Note: Richard Nason—a poet and harsh critic of Ashbery—wrote in 1991 that he had been informed "Ashbery these days keeps a sharp weather eye on the doings of the Nobel Committee in Stockholm" and had "already evinced sharp disappointment that the Nobel had so far eluded him." In a sympathetic remembrance of Ashbery after his death, writer Eileen Myles mentioned that she "heard that he really wanted a Nobel Prize.")

=== Factors that may have affected Ashbery's odds to win the Nobel ===
Ashbery was the subject of public Nobel speculation as early as 1995, when Swedish publisher Svante Weyler dropped his name to the Associated Press as a candidate under discussion. Other members of the Swedish literati generally predicted a Nobel was due for a poet, a European, or possibly a European poet. Ultimately, Irish poet Seamus Heaney won that year.

Ashbery's Nobel odds 2009–2016
Year	Odds	Ref.
2009	—N/a	
2010	25/1	
2011	—	
2012	66/1	
2013	100/1	
2014	—	
2015	50/1	
2016	100/1	
Odds via Ladbrokes

Ladbrokes, a British betting and gambling company, has given odds for various potential candidates to win the Nobel in Literature every year since 2002. Ladbrokes' odds are regularly cited in the press, as Noble recipients are notoriously difficult to predict given the wide field of potential candidates, who are often obscure to the general public. Per Ladbrokes, Ashbery had his best odds to win in 2010, at 25/1. Those odds placed him below E. L. Doctorow (at 22/1), above Philip Roth and Maya Angelou (both at 33/1), and on par with the Polish poet Adam Zagajewski.

Literary commentators believed Ashbery's Nobel prospects were boosted by his relative preeminence in his field. It stood to reason that if any poet—especially an American one—were to receive a Nobel in a given year, he would have been among the most probable choices. In 2008, David Orr wrote in The New York Times that, among American poets, only Ashbery and Adrienne Rich enjoyed "international reputations conceivably large enough to interest Nobel jurors" at that time. The same year, the Swedish scholar Kerstin Lundberg Hahn commented that it had been a long time since a Nobel had gone to a poet—the last had been Heaney in 1995—and he named Ashbery, Adunis (a Syrian), and Les Murray (an Australian) as probable winners for poetry.

On the other hand, Ashbery's chances may have been dampened by his avant-garde style, which diverged from the universalism favored by the Nobel Committee. Ange Mlinko commented that "[e]very year that the Nobel committee passes over poet John Ashbery for a socially responsible novelist, it proves that the prize for literature is just an arm of the Peace Prize, rather than–like the Nobels for physics or chemistry–a prize for radical discovery in the field." According to Charles North, Ashbery was hindered because, "unlike most of those who have won the prize," he was "not perceived as engagé"—that is, he was not perceived to be seriously engaged as a writer with any pressing moral or political causes; nonetheless, North wrote, there was "no [other] writer whose poems are more engaged with what it means to be human." Jeffrey Gray claimed there is a symbolic expectation that a Nobel winner will embody their national literature, and Ashbery was not necessarily an obvious choice to represent American literature as a whole:

"No one—neither a nation nor a Nobel committee—seems to want a primarily linguistic or 'experimental' poet as spokesperson. (Consider the U.S. poet laureates from Frost till the present, particularly now that each poet is allowed a very short tenure—Rita Dove, Robert Pinsky, Robert Hass, Billy Collins, and others, and then consider what chances an even more famous figure such as John Ashbery might have of being selected.)"

Ashbery was also openly gay, and his sexuality may have influenced Nobel deliberations. Alfred Corn, a gay American poet and friend of Ashbery, noted in an obituary for The Gay & Lesbian Review Worldwide that he had won "every prize you can think of except for the Nobel, which almost never goes to gay writers." Eileen Myles, an American writer and lesbian, suggested in Out magazine that Ashbery's heightened aestheticism and open homosexuality made him an improbable fit for the committee's restrained sensibilities:

"... [A]nyone who knew his work also knew it was unlikely he could receive the Nobel Prize for Literature since there was no reason to give such a lofty international award to him. And that him definitely has a little gay twist. Have Nobel prizes gone to known gay aesthetes before[?]"

== Sources ==
=== Bibliography ===
- Ashbery, John (2004). Richie, Eugene (ed.). Selected Prose (2005 paperback ed.). University of Michigan Press. ISBN 0-472-03139-2 – via Google Books.
- Bethell, John T.; Hunt, Richard M.; Shenton, Robert (2004). Harvard A to Z. Harvard University Press. ISBN 0-674-01288-7 – via the Internet Archive (registration required).
- Bowering, George, ed. (2008). The Griffin Poetry Prize 2008 Anthology. House of Anansi Press. ISBN 978-1-77089-143-2 – via Google Books.
- Bradley, George, ed. (1998). The Yale Younger Poets Anthology. Yale University Press. ISBN 0-300-07472-7 – via the Internet Archive (registration required).
- Brennan, Elizabeth A.; Clarage, Elizabeth C. (1999). Who's Who of Pulitzer Prize Winners. Oryx Press. ISBN 1-57356-111-8 – via the Internet Archive (registration required).
- Coser, Lewis A.; Kadushin, Charles; Powell, Walter W. (1982). Books: The Culture and Commerce of Publishing. Basic Books. ISBN 0-465-00745-7 – via the Internet Archive (registration required).
- Daugaard, Solveig (2018). Collaborating with Gertrude Stein: Media Ecologies, Reception, Poetics. Linköping Studies in Art and Sciences. Linköping University. ISBN 978-91-7685-309-2 – via Google Books.
- Diggory, Mark, ed. (2009). Encyclopedia of the New York School Poets. Facts on File, Inc. (an imprint of Infobase Publishing). ISBN 978-0-8160-5743-6.
- Ellingham, Lewis; Killian, Kevin (1998). Poet Be Like God: Jack Spicer and the San Francisco Renaissance. Wesleyan University Press. ISBN 0-8195-5308-5 – via Internet Archive.
- English, James F. (2005). The Economy of Prestige: Prizes, Awards, and the Circulation of Cultural Value (2008 paperback ed.). Harvard University Press. ISBN 978-0-674-03043-5 – via Google Books.
- Epstein, Andrew (2001). "John Ashbery 1927–". In Haralson, Eric L. (ed.). Encyclopedia of American Poetry: The Twentieth Century (2012 ed.). Routledge. pp. 24–26. ISBN 1-57958-240-0 – via Google Books.
- Fischer, Heinz-D., ed. (2009). Chronicle of the Pulitzer Prizes for Poetry: Discussions, Decisions and Documents. K. G. Saur Verlag GmbH. ISBN 978-3-11-023007-9 – via Google Books.
- Fischer, Heinz-D.; Fischer, Erika J. (2003). Complete Historical Handbook of the Pulitzer Prize System 1917–2000, Part F: Decision-Making Processes in All Award Categories Based on Unpublished Sources. Vol. 17. K. G. Saur Verlag GmbH. ISBN 3-598-30187-1 – via Google Books.
- Ford, Mark (2008). "Chronology". Collected Poems 1956–1987. By Ashbery, John. Ford, Mark (ed.). The Library of America series. Vol. 187. Library of America. pp. 993–1005. ISBN 978-1-59853-028-5 – via the Internet Archive (registration required).
- Gray, Jeffrey (2005). Mastery's End: Travel and Postwar American Poetry (2012 ed.). University of Georgia Press. ISBN 0-8203-2663-1 – via Google Books.
- Gray, Richard (2011). a Brief History of American Literature. Wiley-Blackwell. ISBN 978-1-405-19231-6.
- Hazzard, Oli (2018). John Ashbery and Anglo-American Exchange: The Minor Eras. Oxford University Press. ISBN 978-0-19-882201-1 – via Google Books.
- Heinze, Rüdiger (2005). Ethics of Literary Forms in Contemporary American Literature. LIT Verlag. ISBN 3-8258-8536-4 – via Google Books.
- Henderson, Bill, ed. (1977). The Pushcart Prize, II: Best of the Small Presses. The Pushcart Prize. Pushcart Press. ISBN 0-916366-02-2 – via the Internet Archive (registration required).
- Kermani, David K. (1976). John Ashbery: A Comprehensive Bibliography, Including His Art Criticism, and with Selected Notes from Unpublished Materials. Garland Reference Library of the Humanities. Vol. 14. Garland Publishing. ISBN 0-8240-9997-4 – via the Internet Archive (registration required).
- Killian, Kevin; Brazil, David (2010). "Introduction: Why Poets Theater?" (PDF). The Kenning Anthology of Poets Theater: 1945–1985. Kenning Editions. pp. i–xiv. ISBN 978-0-9767364-5-5 – via KenningEditions.com.
- Leckey, Susan, ed. (2015). The Europa Directory of Literary Awards and Prizes. Routledge. ISBN 978-1-85743-146-9 – via Google Books.
- Lehman, David; Bloom, Harold, eds. (1998). The Best of the Best American Poetry 1988–1997. The Best American Poetry. Scribner. ISBN 0-684-84279-3. ISSN 1040-5763 – via the Internet Archive (registration required).
- ———; Collins, Billy, eds. (2006). The Best American Poetry 2006. The Best American Poetry. Scribner. ISBN 978-0-7432-2967-8. ISSN 1040-5763 – via the Internet Archive (registration required).
- ———; Creeley, Robert, eds. (2002). The Best American Poetry 2002. The Best American Poetry. Scribner. ISBN 0-7432-0385-2. ISSN 1040-5763 – via the Internet Archive (registration required).
- ———; Duhamel, Denise, eds. (2013). The Best American Poetry 2013. The Best American Poetry. Scribner. ISBN 978-1-4767-0802-7. ISSN 1040-5763 – via Google Books.
- ———; Gerstler, Amy, eds. (2010). The Best American Poetry 2010. The Best American Poetry. Scribner. ISBN 978-1-4391-8147-8. ISSN 1040-5763 – via Google Books.
- ———; Hass, Robert, eds. (2001). The Best American Poetry 2001. The Best American Poetry. Scribner. ISBN 0-7432-0383-6. ISSN 1040-5763 – via Google Books.
- ———; Hayes, Terrance, eds. (2014). The Best American Poetry 2014. The Best American Poetry. Scribner. ISBN 978-1-4767-0815-7. ISSN 1040-5763 – via Google Books.
- ———; Hejinian, Lyn, eds. (2004). The Best American Poetry 2004. The Best American Poetry. Scribner. ISBN 0-7432-5737-5. ISSN 1040-5763 – via Google Books.
- ———; Hollander, John, eds. (1998). The Best American Poetry 1998. The Best American Poetry. Scribner. ISBN 0-684-81450-1. ISSN 1040-5763 – via the Internet Archive (registration required).
- ———; Muldoon, Paul, eds. (2005). The Best American Poetry 2005. The Best American Poetry. Scribner. ISBN 978-0-7432-5738-1. ISSN 1040-5763 – via the Internet Archive (registration required).
- ———; Pinsky, Robert, eds. (2013). The Best of the Best American Poetry: 25th Anniversary Edition. The Best American Poetry. Scribner. ISBN 978-1-4516-5887-3. ISSN 1040-5763 – via Google Books.
- ———; Trethewey, Natasha, eds. (2017). The Best American Poetry 2017. The Best American Poetry. Scribner. ISBN 978-1-5011-2763-2. ISSN 1040-5763.
- ———; Wagoner, David, eds. (2009). The Best American Poetry 2009. The Best American Poetry. Scribner. ISBN 978-0-7432-9976-3. ISSN 1040-5763 – via the Internet Archive (registration required).
- ———; Wright, Charles, eds. (2008). The Best American Poetry 2008. The Best American Poetry. Scribner. ISBN 978-0-7432-9974-9. ISSN 1040-5763 – via the Internet Archive (registration required).
- ———; Young, Kevin, eds. (2011). The Best American Poetry 2011. The Best American Poetry. Scribner. ISBN 978-1-4391-8150-8. ISSN 1040-5763 – via the Internet Archive (registration required).
- MacArthur, Marit J. (2008). The American Landscape in the Poetry of Frost, Bishop, and Ashbery: The House Abandoned. American Literature Readings in the 21st Century. Palgrave Macmillan. ISBN 978-0-230-60322-6.
- Millier, Brett C. (1993). Elizabeth Bishop: Life and the Memory of It. University of California Press. ISBN 0-520-07978-7 – via Google Books.
- Morgan, Bill (2006). I Celebrate Myself: The Somewhat Private Life of Allen Ginsberg. Viking Penguin. ISBN 0-670-03796-6 – via the Internet Archive (registration required).
- Murray, Joan; et al., eds. (2006). The Pushcart Book of Poetry: The Best Poems From Three Decades of the Pushcart Prize. The Pushcart Prize. Pushcart Press. ISBN 1-888889-34-9 – via the Internet Archive (registration required).
- Nason, Richard (1991). Boiled Grass and the Broth of Shoes: Reconstructing Literary Deconstruction. McFarland & Company. ISBN 0-89950-643-7 – via Google Books (snippet view).
- National Endowment for the Arts and National Council on the Arts (February 27, 1970). 1969 Annual Report (PDF) (Report). Archived (PDF) from the original on April 25, 2019 – via arts.gov.
- ——— (1976). 1976 Annual Report (PDF) (Report). Archived (PDF) from the original on September 6, 2019 – via arts.gov.
- Perloff, Marjorie (1981). The Poetics of Indeterminacy: Rimbaud to Cage. Princeton University Press. ISBN 0-691-06244-7 – via the Internet Archive (registration required).
- Phillips, Carl, ed. (2019). Firsts: 100 Years of Yale Younger Poets. Yale University Press. ISBN 978-0-300-24316-1 – via Google Books.
- Roffman, Karin (2017). The Songs We Know Best: John Ashbery's Early Life. Farrar, Straus and Giroux. ISBN 978-0-374-29384-0 – via Google Books.
- Sergeant, Howard; Austin, Waddell; Flanner, Hildegarde; Howard, Frances Minturn; D'Auria, Gemma; Miranda, Gary, eds. (1977). Best Poems of 1976: Borestone Mountain Poetry Awards 1977. Vol. 29. Pacific Books. ISBN 978-3-11-023007-9 – via the Internet Archive (registration required).
- Tanselle, G. Thomas; Kardon, Peter F.; Schwager, Eunice R., eds. (2001). The John Simon Guggenheim Memorial Foundation, 1925–2000: A Seventy-Fifth Anniversary Record. John Simon Guggenheim Memorial Foundation. LCCN 2002449246 – via the Internet Archive (registration required).
- Topping, Seymour (1999). Foreword. Who's Who of Pulitzer Prize Winners. By Brennan, Elizabeth A.; Clarage, Elizabeth C. Oryx Press. pp. vii–xiv. ISBN 1-57356-111-8 – via the Internet Archive (registration required).
- Vincent, John Emil (2007). John Ashbery and You: His Later Books. University of Georgia Press. ISBN 978-0-8203-2973-4 – via Google Books.
- Wagner, Charles (1974). "Article XVII: The Poetry Society of America". In Kay, Ernest (ed.). International Who's Who in Poetry 1974–1975. Marquis Who's Who (Fourth ed.). Melrose Press. pp. 669–670. ISBN 0-900332-29-8 – via the Internet Archive (registration required).
- White, Edmund (2009). City Boy: My Life in New York During the 1960s and 1970s (2010 paperback ed.). Bloomsbury. ISBN 978-1-4088-0942-6.

=== Academic and literary journals ===
- Beebe, Maurice, ed. (1976). "Individual Writers". Journal of Modern Literature. 5 (4). Indiana University Press: 649–856. JSTOR 3830931.
- Berg, Stephen; Bonnano, David; Scanlon, Elizabeth, eds. (November–December 2011). "In Memoriam: Jerome J. Shestack: 1923—2011". The American Poetry Review. 40 (6): 5. JSTOR 23052665.
- Berg, Stephen; Bonnano, David; Vogelsang, Arthur, eds. (September–October 1984). "The Editors of The American Poetry Review are happy to announce the recipients of the Jerome J. Shestack Prizes for 1983". The American Poetry Review. 13 (5): 3. JSTOR 27777426.
- Berg, Stephen; Bonnano, David; Vogelsang, Arthur, eds. (May–June 1996). "The Editors of The American Poetry Review are happy to announce the recipients of the Jerome J. Shestack Prizes for 1995". The American Poetry Review. 25 (3): 3. JSTOR 27782078.
- Carter, Elliott; Ashbery, John (Summer 2014). "The Origins of Syringa (1978)". Chicago Review. 38 (3–4): 114–123. JSTOR 24770645.
- Corn, Alfred (December 1991). "Flow Chart, by John Ashbery". Poetry. 159 (3). Poetry Foundation: 169–172. JSTOR 20603040.
- Edelstein, J. M. (Spring 1977). "News and Comments" (PDF). The Wallace Stevens Journal. 1 (1). The Wallace Stevens Society: 37–39. Archived (PDF) from the original on September 15, 2019 – via WallaceStevens.com.
- Fitzgerald, Adam (Summer 2014). "John Ashbery". Bomb (128): 72–78. JSTOR 24365872. Archived from the original on September 21, 2019 – via either JSTOR in PDF format (subscription required) or BombMagazine.org as a web page.
- Gizzi, Peter; Morrow, Bradford (October 2007). "Editors' Note". Conjunctions (49). Bard College: 230–231. ISBN 978-0-941-964-65-4. JSTOR 24516468.
- Hine, Daryl, ed. (November 1974). "Announcement of Prize Awards for 1974". Poetry. 125 (2). Poetry Foundation: 117–118. JSTOR 20596602.
- ———, ed. (November 1977). "Announcement of Prize Awards for 1977". Poetry. 131 (2). Poetry Foundation: 111–112. JSTOR 20592856.
- Nims, John Frederick, ed. (November 1979). "Announcement of Prize Awards for 1979". Poetry. 135 (2). Poetry Foundation: 112–113. JSTOR 20593651.
- Notable Books Council (1978). Notable Books 1977 (PDF). American Library Association. ISBN 0-8389-5519-3. Archived (PDF) from the original on October 7, 2017 – via ala.org.
- ——— (1982). Notable Books 1981 (PDF). American Library Association. ISBN 0-8389-5613-0. Archived (PDF) from the original on October 7, 2017 – via ala.org.
- ——— (Summer 2012). "Notable Books: The 2012 Selection of Titles". Reference & User Services Quarterly. 51 (4). American Library Association: 327–329. doi:10.5860/rusq.51n4.327. JSTOR refuseserq.51.4.327.
- Oliver, Roger (Winter 1979). "Interview: Poet in the Theatre". Performing Arts Journal. 3 (3). MIT Press: 15–27. doi:10.2307/3245102. JSTOR 3245102. S2CID 192334390.
- Parisi, Joseph, ed. (April 1985). "News Notes". Poetry. 146 (1). Poetry Foundation: 51. JSTOR 20600273.
- ———, ed. (December 1985). "News Notes". Poetry. 147 (3). Poetry Foundation: 171–172. JSTOR 20600551.
- ———, ed. (April 1987). "News Notes". Poetry. 150 (1). Poetry Foundation: 47–49. JSTOR 20601101.
- ———, ed. (July 1992). "News Notes". Poetry. 160 (4). Poetry Foundation: 240–241. JSTOR 20603270.
- ———, ed. (December 1996). "News Notes". Poetry. 169 (2). Poetry Foundation: 170–172. JSTOR 40734068.
- ———, ed. (March 1997). "News Notes". Poetry. 169 (5). Poetry Foundation: 351–353. JSTOR 40733973.
- ———, ed. (May 2002). "News Notes". Poetry. 180 (2). Poetry Foundation: 107–109. JSTOR 20605703.
- Perea, Manuel; Pilon, Kris, eds. (2002). "Poets of the Year" (PDF). Inscape. 57. Pasadena City College: 77. Archived (PDF) from the original on October 10, 2019.
- Powell, Judith; Rosario, John (Summer 1989). "Creative Arts Salutes Ashbery, Bourgeois, Mekas, Six Others with Awards". Around the University. Brandeis Review. 8 (4). Brandeis University: 4–5 – via the Internet Archive.
- Purves, Drika (April 1985). "The Gazette". The Yale University Library Gazette. 59 (3–4): 115–121. JSTOR 40858858.
- Rago, Henry, ed. (November 1959). "News Notes". Poetry. 95 (2). Poetry Foundation: 134–135. JSTOR 20587689.
- ———, ed. (March 1960). "News Notes". Poetry. 95 (6). Poetry Foundation: 382–385. JSTOR 20587832.
- ———, ed. (December 1963). "Announcement of Prize Awards for 1963". Poetry. 103 (3). Poetry Foundation: 202–203. JSTOR 20589545.
- ———, ed. (November 1966). "Announcement of Prize Awards for 1966". Poetry. 109 (2). Poetry Foundation: 130–131. JSTOR 20597912.
- Rasula, Jed (Summer 1995). "The Empire's New Clothes: Anthologizing American Poetry in the 1990s". American Literary History. 7 (2). Oxford University Press: 261–283. doi:10.1093/alh/7.2.261. JSTOR 489836.
- Riggan, William (Spring 1987). "The Last Page". World Literature Today. 61 (2). University of Oklahoma: 357–359. JSTOR 40143303.
- Santiago, Carlos; Faulkner, Don; Kennedy, William; Plimpton, George; Ashbery, John; Vonnegut, Kurt (Summer 2001). "State Author/Poet Reading/Presentations — January 22, 2001". New York State Writers Institute – Writers Online Magazine. State University of New York at Albany. Archived from the original on August 20, 2019.
- Stewart, Michael Seth (June 2014). 'For the Voices': The Letters of John Wieners (PhD). Graduate Center, CUNY.
- Unger, Brian (February 2014). Space & Distance As I Require: The Journals and Prose Fragments of Philip Whalen 1950–1966 (PhD). Graduate Center, CUNY.
- Wasserman, Rosanne; Richie, Eugene (Winter 2013). "'All the Things One Wants': John Ashbery's French Translations". The Massachusetts Review. 54 (4): 578–601. JSTOR 43821145.
- Yezzi, David (February 2001). "Shorter notice". The New Criterion. 19 (6): 75. Archived from the original on October 11, 2019.

=== Magazines, newspapers and websites ===
- Anon. (n.d.). "Golden Plate Awardees". American Academy of Achievement. Archived from the original on December 12, 2017.
- Anon. (n.d.). "Awards – American Academy of Arts and Letters". American Academy of Arts and Letters. Archived from the original on July 29, 2019.
- Anon. (n.d.). "BoBi Award Winners". Brooklyn Book Festival. Archived from the original on April 22, 2019.
- Anon. (n.d.). "Honors and Awards". Flow Chart Foundation. Archived from the original on August 26, 2019.
- Anon. (n.d.). "America Awards". Green Integer. Archived from the original on September 15, 2019.
- Anon. (n.d.). "Frequently Asked Questions". John Simon Guggenheim Memorial Foundation. Archived from the original on July 8, 2019.
- Anon. (n.d.). "Preise & Förderungen: Horst-Bienek-Preis für Lyrik" [Prizes & Promotions: Horst Bienek Prize for Poetry]. Literaturportal-Bayern.de (in German). Literaturportal Bayern [Bavarian Literature Portal]. Archived from the original on May 19, 2015.
- Anon. (n.d.). "Annual Report 2006" (PDF). NYC.gov. New York City Department of Cultural Affairs. Archived (PDF) from the original on February 22, 2017.
- Anon. (n.d.). "Frequently asked questions". NobelPrize.org. Nobel Media. Archived from the original on July 13, 2019.
- Anon. (n.d.). "Prizes". The Paris Review. Archived from the original on September 2, 2019.
- Anon. (n.d.). "John Ashbery". Poetry Foundation. Archived from the original on March 30, 2019.
- Anon. (n.d.). "Ruth Lilly Poetry Prize". Poetry Foundation. Archived from the original on October 7, 2019.
- Anon. (n.d.). "Frost & Shelley Awards". Poetry Society of America. Archived from the original on April 25, 2019.
- Anon. (n.d.). "Self-Portrait in a Convex Mirror, by John Ashbery (Viking)". Pulitzer.org. Columbia University.
- Anon. (n.d.). "About – The Foundation". Robert Creeley Foundation. Archived from the original on February 11, 2019.
- Anon. (n.d.). "Award – Robert Creeley Award". Robert Creeley Foundation. Archived from the original on February 11, 2019.
- Anon. (n.d.). "Signet Society Medalists". Signet Society. Archived from the original on April 24, 2019.
- Anon. (January 31, 1967). "31 'Leading Nominees' Chosen For the National Book Awards". The New York Times – via the TimesMachine (subscription required).
- Anon. (April 10, 1969). "6 Writers Named to Share $34,000 Worth of Grants". The New York Times – via the TimesMachine (subscription required).
- Anon. (May 4, 1976). "Sketches of the Winners of the 60th Pulitzer Prizes in Journalism and the Arts". The New York Times. Archived from the original on July 6, 2019.
- Anon. (April 11, 1977). "City Library to Honor Poet". Local. Democrat and Chronicle. p. 13 – via Newspapers.com (subscription required).
- Anon. (April 4, 1980). "Arts and Letters Body Elects 11 New Members". The New York Times – via the TimesMachine (subscription required).
- Anon. (November 22, 1982). "John Ashbery Is Chosen For Poetry Fellowship". The New York Times.(subscription required)
- Anon. (September 23, 1984). "1984 Los Angeles Times Book Prizes Nominations". Book Review. Los Angeles Times – via Newspapers.com (subscription required).
- Anon. (October 26, 1986). "The Los Angeles Times Book Prize 1986". Book Review. Los Angeles Times. Archived from the original on September 4, 2019.
- Anon. (1998). "The Fourth Annual Boston Book Review Literary Awards (1998)". Boston Book Review. Bookwire.com. ISSN 1072-8317. Archived from the original on June 22, 2001.
- Anon. (June 7, 2001). "Honorary degrees awarded to eleven". The Harvard Gazette (Press release). Harvard University. Archived from the original on October 28, 2019.
- Anon. (October 12, 2005). "Quills Winners, NBA Finalists, Man Booker Winner". Bookweb.org. American Booksellers Association. Archived from the original on September 3, 2019.
- Anon. (April 4, 2006). "Juniper Literary Festival to Celebrate Work of Renowned Poet John Ashbery on April 28–29". University of Massachusetts Amherst News & Media Relations. Archived from the original on October 29, 2019.
- Anon. (2008). "The English-Speaking Union of the United States' Ambassador Book Awards". English-Speaking Union of the United States. Archived from the original on September 20, 2010.
- Anon. (May 27, 2008). "Yale Awards Poet John Ashbery an Honorary Degree" (Press release). Beinecke Rare Book & Manuscript Library. Archived from the original on October 28, 2019.
- Anon. (January 25, 2010). "Lucille Clifton Awarded Centennial Frost Medal". BOA Blog. BOA Editions, Ltd. Archived from the original on June 16, 2016.
- Anon. (September 13, 2010). "John Ashbery and Paul Auster at Brooklyn Book Festival; February House". Library of America. Archived from the original on September 23, 2019.
- Anon. (January 24, 2011). "Announcing the 2011 Frost Medalist, Charles Simic". PoetrySociety.org. Poetry Society of America. Archived from the original on May 18, 2019.
- Anon. (September 23, 2011). "John Ashbery – Recent Collages" (pdf). PoetrySociety.org (Press release). Tibor de Nagy Gallery. Archived from the original on October 28, 2019.
- Anon. (June 7, 2012). "The Oxford-Weidenfeld Translation Prize – The 2012 Winner". The Queen's College. Archived from the original on June 23, 2012.
- Anon. (November 30, 2012). "Grants / Awards / Residencies". PEN America. Archived from the original on November 16, 2018.
- Anon. (December 10, 2013). "Poetry Foundation Launches New Criticism Prize". Poets & Writers.
- Anon. (December 31, 2013). "Annuario della Accademia Nazionale dei Lincei 2014" [Yearbook of the National Academy of Lincei 2014] (PDF). Association of Friends of the Accademia dei Lincei and Sciences and Letters. Archived (PDF) from the original on April 23, 2016.
- Anon. (March 16, 2014). "Costa, Huston and Rivera to receive Common Wealth Awards". Delaware Online. Archived from the original on June 30, 2018.
- Anon. (2015). "Pegasus Award for Poetry Criticism 2014". Poetry Foundation. Archived from the original on September 5, 2015.
- Anon. (2019). "Honorees by Year". Los Angeles Times. Archived from the original on July 25, 2019.
- Anon. (October 2, 2019). "Roberto Powers '71, 2019 Heritage Award Recipient". Deerfield Academy. Archived from the original on October 10, 2019 – via Vimeo.
- Adams, James (April 9, 2008). "Older poets' greatest hits make the cut". The Globe and Mail. Archived from the original on September 20, 2019.
- "Le romancier français Le Clézio parmi les favoris du Nobel de littérature" [French novelist Le Clézio among the favorites for the Nobel in Literature]. La Dépêche. AFP. October 3, 2008. Archived from the original on September 27, 2015.
- Aleksander, Irina (April 14, 2009). "Ha-Da-Da! Literary Elites Flock to Paris Review Spring Revel". The New York Observer. Archived from the original on April 17, 2013.
- Alter, Alexandra (January 31, 2018). "The Globalization of the National Book Awards". The New York Times. Archived from the original on November 15, 2018.
- Anderson, Hephzibah (October 3, 2011). "Ladbrokes Says Syrian Poet Adonis Is Smart Bet for Nobel Prize". Bloomberg News. Archived from the original on October 11, 2014 – via bloomberg.com (subscription required).
- Arenson, Karen W. (November 28, 2001). "Bulletin Board; Poetry Award Given Out". The New York Times. Archived from the original on May 27, 2015.
- Ball, Don, ed. (March 2006). NEA Literature Fellowships: 40 Years of Supporting American Writers (PDF) (Report). National Endowment for the Arts Office of Communications. Archived (PDF) from the original on April 25, 2019 – via arts.gov.
- Bard Publications Office (2019). "Bard College Catalogue 2019–20" (pdf). Bard College. Archived from the original on October 10, 2019.
- Bernstein, Jacob (October 10, 2012). "The Education of Tony Marx". The New York Times. Archived from the original on January 31, 2018.
- Betters, Michelle (September 23, 2017). "Numbers & Golden Ages: A Closer Look at the National Book Award for Poetry". Ploughshares. Emerson College. Archived from the original on September 3, 2019.
- BettingPro staff (September 26, 2011). "Nobel Prize in Literature odds – Adonis and Tomas Transtromer favourites". BettingPro. Archived from the original on October 4, 2011.
- BettingPro staff (October 8, 2014). "Nobel Prize for Literature odds – Ngugi Wa Thiong'o the bookmakers choice for prestigious prize". BettingPro. Archived from the original on September 21, 2019.
- Bassiri, Kaveh (December 1, 2009). "Iranian Named mtvU Poet Laureate". Poets & Writers. Archived from the original on January 2, 2012.
- Bjarvall, Katarina (October 2, 1995). "This Year, Guessers Favor a European Poet". Associated Press.
- Bofill-Amargós, Joan (n.d.). "Biscuit Medal for John Ashbery". JoanBofill.com. Archived from the original on October 8, 2019.
- ——— (September 2017). "John Ashbery, the Innovator of the 20th Century Poetry, Has Passed Away". The Raymond Roussel Society. Archived from the original on February 18, 2019.
- Brown, Les (March 9, 1979). "6 New Series in NBC Spring Cleaning – Eight Playwrights Get Grants for Residencies". The New York Times. Archived from the original on October 8, 2019.
- Carrera, Alessandro (October 1, 2009). "Meglio un Pulitzer di un Nobel" [Better a Pulitzer than a Nobel]. Europa (in Italian) – via democratica.com.
- Cea, Cara (April 16, 2003). "Hillary Clinton, Tony Randall among honorary degree recipients at Pace Commencement Ceremonies" (Press release). Pace University Press Room. Archived from the original on October 28, 2019.
- Ciuraru, Carmela; Jackson, Julia; Samuel, Benjamin; Marcus, Halimah (November 17, 2011). "2011 National Book Awards Madness!". Electric Literature. Archived from the original on January 31, 2015.
- Corn, Alfred (September 13, 2017). "John Ashbery Remembered by a Fellow Poet". The Gay & Lesbian Review Worldwide. Archived from the original on October 8, 2019.
- Curtis, Colleen (February 13, 2012). "President Obama Awards the 2011 National Medals of Arts and Humanities at the White House" (Press release). White House Office of Digital Strategy. Archived from the original on June 27, 2019 – via obamawhitehouse.archives.gov, maintained by the National Archives and Records Administration.
- Darrow, Emily (February 11, 2003). "The John Ashbery Poetry Series at Bard Presents Readings by John Ashbery and Tom Raworth on Thursday, February 20" (Press release). Bard College. Archived from the original on September 24, 2015.
- Fehrman, Craig (October 28, 2011). "The Short, Unsuccessful Life of the American Book Awards". The New York Times. Archived from the original on September 3, 2019.
- Fein, Esther B. (May 6, 1992). "Book Notes". The New York Times. Archived from the original on 2018-01-16.
- Fein, Esther B. (November 18, 1992). "Book Notes". The New York Times. Archived from the original on January 15, 2018.
- Ferrell, Monica; Maldonado, Ricardo; Schulman, Grace; Herron, Sophie; Warren, Rosanna; Corral, Eduardo C.; Sánchez, Erika L.; Skeets, Jake; Nguyen, Diana Khoi; Cooley, Nicole; Rankine, Camille (March 22, 2019). "Discovering the Discovery Poetry Contest: A collective history". 92y.org. 92nd Street Young Men's and Young Women's Hebrew Association. Archived from the original on September 16, 2019.
- Fraser, C. Gerald (January 9, 1976). "National Book Critics Circle Gives First Awards". The New York Times. Archived from the original on July 6, 2019.
- Gaffney, Spencer (October 5, 2010). "British Gambling Website Gives Joyce Carol Oates 18-1 Odds to Win Nobel Prize in Literature". University Press Club. Archived from the original on April 16, 2019.
- Garner, Dwight; Sehgal, Parul; Szalai, Jennifer; Williams, John (September 20, 2018). "The Nobel Prize in Literature Takes This Year Off. Our Critics Don't". The New York Times. Archived from the original on August 16, 2019.
- Gussow, Mel (January 1, 1978). "Grants to Playwrights—A Look Backstage". The New York Times. Archived from the original on October 8, 2019.
- ——— (March 14, 2001). "Reconnecting With the Spirit Of a Departed Poet; An Anthology and Conferences Celebrate James Merrill's Work". The New York Times. Archived from the original on May 27, 2015.
- Harriet staff (September 22, 2011). "John Lithgow to give John Ashbery a Lifetime Achievement Award, natch". Poetry Foundation. Archived from the original on October 21, 2018.
- ——— (September 5, 2019). "Rita Dove Honored With 2019 Wallace Stevens Award". Poetry Foundation. Archived from the original on October 7, 2019.
- Hertweck, Frank (March 18, 2016). "Das Lob der Kritiker: SWR Bestenliste Die ersten 40 Jahre favourites" [The Praise of the Critics: The First 40 years of the SWR Best List]. SWR.de (in German). Südwestrundfunk. Archived from the original on September 21, 2019.
- Holnes, Darrel Alejandro (February 15, 2012). "PSA at the White House: On the 2011 National Medal of Arts and National Humanities Medal Ceremony". PoetrySociety.org. Poetry Society of America. Archived from the original on September 14, 2017.
- Horowitz, Jason (April 24, 2006). "Proclaiming Ashbery". The New York Observer. Archived from the original on May 5, 2006.
- Horton, Adrian (December 1, 2017). "Sarah Manguso AB '97". Harvardwood.
- Italie, Hillel (November 17, 2011). "National Book Awards honor the 99 percent". Pittsburgh Post-Gazette. Associated Press. Archived from the original on September 29, 2019.
- ——— (September 4, 2017). "John Ashbery, celebrated and challenging poet, dies at 90". Associated Press. Archived from the original on October 18, 2017.
- Janairo, Michael (January 3, 2011). "New York's writers hall of fame class of 2011". Times Union. Archived from the original on September 16, 2019.
- Jordan, Justine (October 10, 2013). "Alice Munro wins the 2013 Nobel prize in literature – as it happened". The Guardian. Archived from the original on February 10, 2019.
- Kellogg, Carolyn (February 10, 2012). "National Medal of Arts and National Humanities Medals announced". Jacket Copy: Books, Authors and All Things Bookish. Los Angeles Times. Archived from the original on March 30, 2019.
- ——— (October 13, 2016). "In a 'radical' choice, Bob Dylan wins the Nobel Prize in literature". Los Angeles Times. Archived from the original on October 13, 2016.
- Khalvati, Mimi (Autumn 2008). "Selector's Comment". PBS Bulletin. No. 218. Poetry Book Society. p. 16. Archived from the original on September 20, 2019.
- Kipen, David (September 28, 2018). "There won't be a Nobel prize in literature this year. But we readers have plenty to celebrate". Los Angeles Times. Archived from the original on February 25, 2019.
- Klein, Julia M. (November 12, 2007). "A Windfall Illuminates the Poetry Field, and Its Fights". The New York Times. Archived from the original on January 17, 2018.
- Kostelanetz, Richard (May 23, 1976). "How to be a difficult poet". The New York Times. Archived from the original on December 29, 2018.
- La Vorgna, Marc; Wood, Julie; Pointer, Danai; Max, Ryan (April 23, 2013). "Mayor Bloomberg Announces Winners of 2013 NYC Literary Honors". NYC.gov (Press release). Government of New York City. Archived from the original on July 7, 2015.
- Lance, Suzanne (December 11, 2000). "NYS Writers Institute at UAlbany Names State Author, Poet" (Press release). State University of New York at Albany. Archived from the original on August 22, 2003.
- Lask, Thomas (April 20, 1976). "National Book Awards Go to Ashbery, Fussell, Gaddis, Edmonds, Arlen, Davis". The New York Times. Archived from the original on February 14, 2018.
- Lawson, Carol (November 13, 1984). "Festive Night for Library Lions". The New York Times. Archived from the original on May 24, 2015.
- Leonard, John (April 19, 1976). "Voting for 'Literary Miss Rheingold,' A Guide to the National Book Awards". The New York Times – via the TimesMachine (subscription required).
- Mancuso, Anne (March 17, 2006). "Where to Go for a Good Talking To". The New York Times. Archived from the original on October 15, 2019.
- McDowell, Edwin (February 3, 1982). "90 Nominees Picked for American Book Awards". The New York Times. Archived from the original on May 24, 2015.
- ——— (December 11, 1984). "Nominees for Book Critics Award". The New York Times. Archived from the original on May 24, 2015.
- ——— (January 16, 1985). "Two Poets Share Yale Bollingen". The New York Times. Archived from the original on November 27, 2017.
- Michaud, Christopher (January 24, 2009). Philip Barbara (ed.). "Book Critics Circle awards finalists announced". Reuters.com. Reuters. Archived from the original on September 11, 2019.
- Mitgang, Herbert (January 12, 1978). "Book Critics Circle Picks Best in 4 Categories". The New York Times. Archived from the original on February 14, 2018.
- ——— (September 25, 1983). "Poets' Association Hailed by the City". The New York Times. Archived from the original on May 24, 2015.
- Melchionda, Marina (December 20, 2009). "Premio Napoli Prize. A Neapolitan Tribute to John Ashbery in NYC". i-Italy. Archived from the original on September 25, 2019.
- Mlinko, Ange (November 29, 2007). "Dreamlife Without Angels". The Nation. Archived from the original on February 18, 2017.
- Monte, Brian R. (March 27, 2013). "Politics Can't Interfere with Love or Border Crossings – An Interview with Moira Egan". Amsterdam Quarterly. ISSN 2542-4815.
- Moyer, Steve (2011). "John Ashbery". National Endowment for the Humanities. Archived from the original on July 1, 2019 – via neh.gov.
- Myles, Eileen (September 9, 2017). "Eileen Myles on John Ashbery". Out. Archived from the original on December 30, 2018.
- Nathan, Paul (January 4, 1993). "Recognition". Publishers Weekly. Vol. 240, no. 1. p. 54.
- New York Times Book Review staff (December 2, 1956). "A Selected List of 250 Outstanding Books of the Year". The New York Times – via the TimesMachine (subscription required).
- New York Times Book Review staff (December 7, 1969). "Other Outstanding Books of the Year". The New York Times – via the TimesMachine (subscription required).
- ——— (December 6, 1970). "1970: A Selected List From Books of the Year". The New York Times – via the TimesMachine (subscription required).
- ——— (December 4, 1977). "A Selection of Noteworthy Titles". The New York Times – via the TimesMachine (subscription required).
- ——— (June 8, 1980). "Books for Summer Reading". The New York Times – via the TimesMachine (subscription required).
- ——— (June 1, 1986). "Summer Reading: Books for Vacation Reading". The New York Times – via the TimesMachine (subscription required).
- ——— (June 5, 1988). "Summer Reading: Books for Vacation Reading". The New York Times – via the TimesMachine (subscription required).
- ——— (December 4, 1988). "Christmas Books: Notable Books of the Year". The New York Times – via the TimesMachine (subscription required).
- ——— (December 1, 1991). "Notable Books of the Year 1991". The New York Times – via the TimesMachine (subscription required).
- ——— (December 4, 1994). "Notable Books of the Year 1994". The New York Times – via the TimesMachine (subscription required).
- ——— (May 31, 1998). "Vacation Reading". The New York Times – via the TimesMachine (subscription required).
- ——— (May 31, 1998). "Vacation Reading". The New York Times – via the TimesMachine (subscription required).
- ——— (December 6, 1998). "Notable Books of 1998". The New York Times – via the TimesMachine (subscription required).
- ——— (December 18, 2009). "Editors' Choice". The New York Times. Archived from the original on September 17, 2019.
- ——— (June 17, 2011). "Editors' Choice". The New York Times. Archived from the original on June 25, 2011.
- North, Charles (October 2017). "How to be a difficult poet". The Brooklyn Rail. Archived from the original on August 29, 2019.
- Olson, Ted (January 25, 1970). "Speaking of Books: The Yale Younger Poets". The New York Times. Archived from the original on September 25, 2019.
- The Onion staff (October 9, 2013). "Fucking Pathetic John Ashbery Actually Thinks He Has Shot at Nobel Prize in Literature This Year". The Onion. Archived from the original on January 11, 2018.
- Orr, David (October 11, 2008). "Yet Once More, a Laurel Not Bestowed". The New York Times. Archived from the original on August 23, 2019.
- ——— (February 19, 2009). "The Great(ness) Game". The New York Times. Archived from the original on April 26, 2019.
- ——— (March 24, 2017). "After Dylan's Nobel, What Makes a Poet a Poet?". The New York Times. Archived from the original on March 25, 2017.
- "Out100 2011". Out. November 14, 2011. Archived from the original on April 28, 2015.
- Phillips, Carl (October 23, 2019). "The Yale Younger Poets Prize: A Microcosm of the American Poetry Landscape". Literary Hub. Archived from the original on October 29, 2019.
- Poets & Writers Prize Reporter (September 7, 2012). "Murakami Projected to Win the Nobel Prize". Poets & Writers. Archived from the original on October 14, 2016.
- Poets & Writers staff (June 5, 2008). "Ashbery Adds to Long List of Honors, Wins Griffin Poetry Prize". Poets & Writers. Archived from the original on October 27, 2013.
- Polito, Robert (June 4, 2014). "Notes from the President of the Poetry Foundation". Poetry Foundation. Archived from the original on October 16, 2018.
- Ray, Sarah C. (July 26, 2012). "Bread Loaf School of English to hold commencement ceremonies in late July and early August" (Press release). Middlebury College. Archived from the original on October 25, 2017.
- Reese, Phil (October 3, 2011). "Teaching LGBT history". Washington Blade. Archived from the original on March 29, 2019.
- Remnick, David (June 18, 1985). "Free Money For Three in Washington; Winners Among 25 to Get MacArthur Grants". The Washington Post. Archived from the original on September 6, 2019 – via WashingtonPost.com (subscription required).
- Rockefeller Foundation (December 31, 1978). The President's Review and Annual Report 1978 (PDF) (Report). Archived (PDF) from the original on October 8, 2019 – via IssueLab.org.
- Rockwell, John (May 18, 1986). "Music: Carter's 'Syringa,' by Speculum Musicae". The New York Times. Archived from the original on September 5, 2019.
- Ross, Shan (May 9, 2017). "Author Alexander McCall Smith honoured by National Arts Club in New York". The Scotsman. Archived from the original on September 26, 2019.
- Rumens, Carol (April 5, 2011). "What the Poetry Book Society means to poets". The Guardian. Archived from the original on October 10, 2015.
- Ryzik, Melena (August 27, 2007). "An 80-Year-Old Poet for the MTV Generation". The New York Times. Archived from the original on June 29, 2019.
- Schaub, Michael (October 31, 2017). "Cynthia Nixon will host this year's National Book Awards". Los Angeles Times. Archived from the original on February 3, 2019.
- Schiavo, Michael (February 1, 2010). "The One Thing That Can Save America: Why John Ashbery Should Be Awarded the Nobel Prize". The Best American Poetry. Archived from the original on September 6, 2015.
- Schiavone, Christian (March 19, 2008). "Poetry captures the moment". WickedLocal – Acton. GateHouse Media. Archived from the original on October 3, 2019.
- Schwartz, Madeleine (May 1, 2009). "Ashbery Accepts Harvard Arts Medal". Harvard Magazine. Archived from the original on October 21, 2018.
- Shaw, Krista (June 29, 2015). "New Poetry from John Ashbery". The Key Reporter. The Phi Beta Kappa Society. Archived from the original on September 17, 2015.
- Shengold, Nina (October 29, 2007). "Perennial Voyager". Chronogram. Luminary Publishing. Archived from the original on September 16, 2019.
- Shephard, Alex (October 7, 2015). "Who Will Win the Nobel Prize for Literature?". The New Republic.
- ——— (October 6, 2016). "Who Will Win the 2016 Nobel Prize in Literature?". The New Republic.
- Shockley, Evie (March 24, 2011). "1976 - Self-Portrait in a Convex Mirror by John Ashbery". National Book Awards Poetry Blog. National Book Foundation. Archived from the original on June 5, 2019.
- Slocum, Bill (June 22, 1997). "Where Poetry Outgrows Hobby Status". The New York Times. Archived from the original on December 28, 2017.
- Smith, Dinitia (May 22, 1997). "Mansion Full of Honors in the Arts". The New York Times. Archived from the original on January 4, 2018.
- ——— (March 22, 1999). "Criticized as Elitist, Poets' Organization Revamps Its Structure". The New York Times. Archived from the original on November 6, 2017.
- So, Jimmy (October 9, 2013). "Nobel Literature Prize Favorites for Dummies, According to the Bookies". The Daily Beast. Archived from the original on August 23, 2019.
- Surdel, Bob (May 15, 2009). "State of the Library Update". ActonForum.com. Archived from the original on October 3, 2019.
- Swansburg, John (January 28, 2001). "The View From/Stonington; If the Walls Could Talk, It Would Be Poetry". The New York Times. Archived from the original on March 23, 2017.
- SWR-Bestenliste Jury (December 20, 2010). "Platz 1 (-) 69 Punkte: John Ashbery: Ein weltgewandtes Land" ["First Place (-) 69 Points: John Ashbery: Ein weltgewandtes Land (German edition of A Worldly Country)"]. SWR.de (in German). Südwestrundfunk.
- ——— (May 24, 2013). "Platz 10 (-) 29 Punkte: John Ashbery: Flussbild / Flow Chart" ["Tenth Place (-) 29 Points: John Ashbery: Flussbild / Flow Chart"]. SWR.de (in German). Südwestrundfunk.
- Taylor, Robert (December 28, 1986). "Once the writing is done..." The Boston Globe. p. 80 – via Newspapers.com (subscription required).
- Teltsch, Kathleen (June 19, 1985). "25 Will Receive MacArthur Awards". The New York Times. Archived from the original on November 24, 2017.
- Topping, Seymour; Gissler, Sig (n.d.). "History of the Pulitzer Prizes". Pulitzer.org. Columbia University. Archived from the original on July 23, 2008.
- Trueheart, Charles (December 8, 1987). "Morrison, Roth Novels Nominated as Best of '87". The Washington Post – via WashingtonPost.com (subscription required).
- Vaccaro, Alessandro (October 22, 2009). "Ashbery e Moresco connessi via radio" [Ashbery and Moresco connected via radio]. La Repubblica (in Italian). Archived from the original on October 1, 2019.
- Van de Kamp Nohl, Mary (February 1, 2005). "The Billionaire's Son". Milwaukee Magazine. Archived from the original on April 1, 2017.
- Vara, Vauhini (October 8, 2014). "The Evolution of Nobel Prize Betting". The New Yorker. Archived from the original on October 10, 2014.
- Whitney, Joel (April 25, 2013). "Lit and Wit at Mayor's Awards". The Wall Street Journal. Archived from the original on October 15, 2019 – via wsj.com (subscription required).
- Wyatt, Edwin (October 13, 2005). "National Book Awards Names Finalists". The New York Times. Archived from the original on September 3, 2019.
