= The Best American Poetry 1990 =

The Best American Poetry 1990 book cover

The Best American Poetry 1990, a volume in The Best American Poetry series, was edited by David Lehman and by guest editor Jorie Graham. The book contains seventy-five poems with a range of poet-authors from a college freshman to the 1990 United States Poet Laureate. David Lehman publicly commented that poetry in America retains its vitality for both the poet and reader, after the 1989 series book attained bestseller status.

Graham chose, as one of the best American poems published in the 12-month period, a work by her husband at the time, James Galvin.

== Poets and poems included ==
Poet	Poem	Where poem previously appeared
A. R. Ammons	"The Damned"	The Yale Review
John Ash	"The Sweeping Gesture"	Broadway
John Ashbery	"Notes from the Air"	The New Yorker
Marvin Bell	"Victim of Himself"	The Atlantic Monthly
Stephen Berg	"First Song/Bankei/1653/"	Denver Quarterly
Mei-mei Berssenbrugge	"Jealousy"	Empathy
Hayden Carruth	"Crucifixion"	American Poetry Review
Anne Carson	"The Life of Towns"	Grand Street
Raymond Carver	"Wake Up"	Michigan Quarterly Review
Amy Clampitt	"My Cousin Muriel"	The New Yorker
Killarney Clary	"'Boys on street corners in Santa Ana...'"	Who Whispered Near Me
Robert Creeley	"Thinking"	Harvard Magazine
Christopher Davis	"Dying in Your Garden of Death to Go Back into My Garden"	The Tyrant of the Past and the Slave of the Future
Thomas M. Disch	"The Crumbling Infrastructure"	Southwest Review
Norman Dubie	"Of Politics & Art"	American Poetry Review
Aaron Fogel	"The Chessboard Is on Fire"	Boulevard
James Galvin	"To the Republic"	New Letters
Suzanne Gardinier	"This Land"	Grand Street
Amy Gerstler	"The Ice Age"	The Paris Review
Linda Gregg	"The War"	New Letters
Thom Gunn	"Duncan"	The Threepenny Review
Donald Hall	"Praise for Death"	The Gettysburg Review
Daniel Halpern	"Bell & Capitol"	Ontario Review
Robert Hass	"Berkeley Eclogue"	Human Wishes
Seamus Heaney	"Crossings"	The New Yorker
Anthony Hecht	"Eclogue of the Shepherd and the Townie"	The Sewanee Review
Emily Hiestand	"On Nothing"	The Hudson Review
Brenda Hillman	"No Greener Pastures"	Fortress
John Hollander	"An Old-Fashioned Song"	The New Republic
Virginia Hooper	"Climbing Out of the Cage"	Denver Quarterly
Richard Howard	"The Victor Vanquished"	Antaeus
Fanny Howe	"Perfection and Derangement"	o•blék
Rodney Jones	"On the Bearing of Waitresses"	Transparent Gestures
Galway Kinnell	"When One Has Lived a Long Time Alone"	The Atlantic Monthly
Edward Kleinschmidt	"Gangue"	The Gettysburg Review
Yusef Komunyakaa	"Facing It"	Dien Cai Dau
Denise Levertov	"Ikon: The Harrowing of Hell"	American Poetry Review
Philip Levine	"Scouting"	Western Humanities Review
Thomas Lux	"Time"	American Poetry Review
Nathaniel Mackey	"Slipped Quadrant"	Avec
Kevin Magee	"Road"	Hambone
Thomas McGrath	"Afternoon of a McGrath"	The Nation
Lynne McMahon	"Barbie's Ferrari"	American Poetry Review
Jane Mead	"Concerning That Prayer I Cannot Make"	The Virginia Quarterly Review
James Merrill	"Quatrains for Pegasus"	The Nation
W. S. Merwin	"The Morning Train"	The New Yorker
Jane Miller	"Adoration"	Black Warrior Review
Susan Mitchell	"Havana Birth"	Ploughshares
Paul Monette	"The Worrying"	Love Alone
Laura Moriarty	"La Malinche"	Temblor
Thylias Moss	"There Will Be Animals"	Pyramid of Bone
Melinda Mueller	"Teratology"	Fine Madness
Laura Mullen	"They"	The Threepenny Review
Alice Notley	"(2 pages from a long poem in progress)"	How(ever)
Michael Palmer	"Six Hermetic Songs"	Sulfur
Robert Pinsky	"Pilgrimage"	Antaeus
Jendi Reiter	"Service Includes Free Lifetime Updating"	Hanging Loose
Joan Retallack	"Japanese Presentation, I & II"	o•blék
Donald Revell	"The Old Causes"	Boulevard
Adrienne Rich	"Living Memory"	American Poetry Review
Michael Ryan	"Switchblade"	God Hunger
James Schuyler	"Haze"	The New Yorker
Frederick Seidel	"AIDS Days"	These Days
Charles Simic	"The Initiate"	Antaeus
Gustaf Sobin	"Transparent Itineraries: 1984"	Voyaging Portraits
Elizabeth Spires	"Primos"	American Poetry Review
David St. John	"Last Night with Rafaella"	The Gettysburg Review
Gerald Stern	"Saving My Skin from Burning"	Iowa Review
Mark Strand	"Orpheus Alone"	The New Yorker
James Tate	"Distance from Loved Ones"	Denver Quarterly
Sidney Wade	"Aurora Borealis and the Body Louse"	Grand Street
Rosanna Warren	"The Cormorant"	Boulevard
Richard Wilbur	"A Wall in the Woods: Cummington"	The New Yorker
Eleanor Wilner	"Reading the Bible Backwards"	Sarah's Choice
Charles Wright	"Saturday Morning Journal"	Antaeus

== Most represented publications in this volume ==
The following publications were represented more than once in this year's volume:

American Poetry Review	7
The New Yorker	7
Antaeus	4
Grand Street	3
Denver Quarterly	3
The Atlantic Monthly	2
The Gettysburg Review	2
o•blék	2
The Threepenny Review	2

== See also ==
- 1990 in poetry
