= The Best American Poetry 1993 =

The Best American Poetry 1993 book cover

The Best American Poetry 1993, a volume in The Best American Poetry series, was edited by David Lehman and by guest editor Louise Glück.

== Poets and poems included ==
Poet	Poem	Where poem previously appeared
A. R. Ammons	"Garbage"	American Poetry Review
John Ashbery	"Baked Alaska"	The New Yorker
Michael Atkinson	"The Same Trouble with Beauty You've Always Had"	Ontario Review
Stephen Berg	"Cold Cash"	The Kenyon Review
Sophie Cabot Black	"Interrogation"	AGNI
Stephanie Brown	"Chapter One"	American Poetry Review
Charles Bukowski	"Three Oranges"	OnTheBus
Hayden Carruth	"At His Last Gig"	The Ohio Review
Tom Clark	"Statue"	American Poetry Review
Killarney Clary	""An Unlikely One Will Guide Me...""	Ploughshares
Marc Cohen	"Sometimes in Winter"	Santa Monica Review
Billy Collins	"Tuesday, June 4th, 1991"	Poetry
Peter Cooley	"Macular Degeneration"	Iowa Review
Carolyn Creedon	"litany"	American Poetry Review
Barbara Cully	"Repressed Theme"	Free Lunch
Carl Dennis	"The Window in Spring"	Shenandoah
Tim Dlugos	"Healing the World from Battery Park"	Hanging Loose
Stephen Dobyns	"Favorite Iraqi Soldier"	The Paris Review
Denise Duhamel	"Feminism"	Hanging Loose
Stephen Dunn	"The Vanishings"	The Paris Review
Roger Fanning	"Shoelace"	Phoebe
Alice B. Fogel	"The Necessity"	Boston Review
Tess Gallagher	"One Kiss"	Fine Madness
Albert Goldbarth	"Life Is Happy,"	Boulevard
Jorie Graham	"What the Instant Contains"	Epoch (magazine)
Allen Grossman	"Great Work Farm Elegy"	Colorado Review
Thom Gunn	"The Butcher's Son"	The New Yorker
Donald Hall	"Pluvia"	The Nation
Mark Halliday	"Vegetable Wisdom"	The Virginia Quarterly Review
Daniel Halpern	"Argument"	Western Humanities Review
Paul Hoover	"Theory"	Ploughshares
David Ignatow	"Absolutely"	Boulevard
Josephine Jacobsen	"Hourglass"	The New Yorker
Mark Jarman	"Questions for Ecclesiastes"	New England Review
Rodney Jones	"Grand Projection"	New England Review
Donald Justice	"Invitation to a Ghost"	Sewanee Theological Review
Brigit Pegeen Kelly	"The White Pilgrim: Old Christian Cemetery"	The Gettysburg Review
Robert Kelly	"Mapping"	Grand Street
Jane Kenyon	"Having It Out with Melancholy"	Poetry
Pamela Kircher	"Looking at the Sea"	The Ohio Review
Kenneth Koch	"Talking to Patrizia"	Poetry
Phyllis Koestenbaum	"Harriet Feigenbaum Is a Sculptor"	Poetry New York
Stanley Kunitz	"Chariot"	The Gettysburg Review
Denise Levertov	"In California During the Gulf War"	American Poetry Review
Lisa Lewis	"The Urinating Man"	Poetry East
Thomas Lux	"Grim Town in a Steep Valley"	Field
Elizabeth Macklin	"The Nearsighted"	The New Yorker
Tom Mandel	"Open Rebuke (Concealed Love)"	Hambone
James McMichael	from "The Person She Is"	TriQuarterly
Sandra McPherson	"Waiting for Lesser Duckweed: On a Proposal of lssa's"	Iowa Review
W.S. Merwin	"The Stranger"	Poetry
Susan Mitchell	"Rapture"	Provincetown Arts
A. F. Moritz	"April Fool's Day, Mount Pleasant Cemetery"	Spoon River Quarterly
Mary Oliver	"Poppies"	The Kenyon Review
Ron Padgett	"Advice to Young Writers"	The World
Michael Palmer	"Who Is to Say"	Epoch
Lucia Maria Perillo	"Skin"	Ontario Review
Wang Ping	"Of Flesh and Spirit"	The World
Lawrence Raab	"Magic Problems"	Shenandoah
Adrienne Rich	"Not Somewhere Else, But Here"	Southwest Review
Laura Riding	"Makeshift"	Chelsea
Gjertrud Schnackenberg	"Angels Grieving over the Dead Christ"	The Yale Review
Hugh Seidman	"Icon"	Pequod
Charles Simic	"This Morning"	The New Yorker
Louis Simpsom	"Suddenly"	The Hudson Review
Gary Snyder	"Ripples on the Surface"	Grand Street
Gerald Stern	"Coleman Valley Road"	Black Warrior Review
Ruth Stone	"That Winter"	American Poetry Review
Mark Strand	from "Dark Harbor"	The New Republic
James Tate	"In My Own Backyard"	American Poetry Review
John Updike	"To a Former Mistress, Now Dead"	Poetry
Ellen Bryant Voigt	"Song and Story"	The Atlantic Monthly
Susan Wheeler	"A Filial Republic"	No Roses Review
C. K. Williams	"A Dream of Mind: The Gap"	The Threepenny Review
Dean Young	"The Business of Love Is Cruelty"	Poetry East

== See also ==
- 1993 in poetry
