= The Best American Poetry 2000 =

Volume in The Best American Poetry series

The Best American Poetry 2000 (ISBN 0-7432-0033-0), a volume in The Best American Poetry series, was edited by David Lehman and by guest editor Rita Dove.

In her introduction, Dove defended the idea that poets should be politically committed: "[W]e poets cannot afford to shit ourselves away in our convalescent homes, boning our specialized fools, while the barbarians — no matter if they are religious fanatics, materialistic profitmongers, crazy silver-tongued niggas sleeping in libraries, or merely more talented MFA drop-outs who actually care about 'art' — continue to sharpen their broadswords. Stepping into the fray of life does not mean dissipation of one's creative powers [...] The reward is a connection on a visceral level with the world [...]."

Speaking of her selection process, Dove indicated that once potential selections had been identified, either via her own reading or as submitted to her by the series editor, David Lehman, "[m]y method was simple: Read the poems without looking at the author's name, if possible, and put aside for further consideration only those pieces which made me catch my breath (then, look back at the names and decide from there). The final criterion was Emily Dickinson's famed description--if I felt the top of my head had been taken off, the poem was in. And in the lofty words of Billy Collins, 'This music is loud yet so confidential./ I cannot help feeling even more/ like the center of the universe'."

Michael Shannon Friedman, reviewing the book in The Charleston Gazette, noted that Dove had admitted the "subjectivity" of her selections, and observed that, in his own view, the year's best selections were poems by Barbara Hamby, Thomas Lux, Stanly Plumly, Susan Wood and Mary Oliver.

== Poets and poems included ==
Poet	Poem	Where poem previously appeared
Kim Addonizio	"Virgin Spring"	Barrow Street
Pamela Alexander	"Semiotics"	Boston Book Review
A. R. Ammons	"Shot Glass"	The New Yorker
Julianna Baggott	"Mary Todd on Her Deathbed"	Quarterly West
Erin Belieu	"Choose Your Garden"	TriQuarterly
Richard Blanco	"Mango, Number 61"	TriQuarterly
Janet Bowdan	"The Year"	Denver Quarterly
Grace Butcher	"Crow Is Walking"	Poetry
Lucille Clifton	"Signs"	Callaloo
Billy Collins	"Man Listening to Disc"	The Atlantic Monthly
Jim Daniels	"Between Periods"	Crab Orchard Review
Linh Dinh	"The Most Beautiful Word"	Xconnect
Gregory Djanikian	"Immigrant Picnic"	Poetry
Denise Duhamel	"Incest Taboo"	Barrow Street
Christopher Edgar	"Birthday"	The Germ
Karl Elder	"Alpha Images"	Beloit Poetry Journal
Lynn Emanuel	"Walt. I Salute You!"	Boulevard
B. H. Fairchild	"Mrs. Hill"	The Southern Review
Charles Fort	"We Did Not Fear the Father"	The Georgia Review
Frank X. Gaspar	"Seven Roses"	The Georgia Review
Elton Glaser	"And in the Afternoons I Botanized"	Parnassus (1973 magazine)
Ray Gonzalez	"For the Other World"	Crab Orchard Review
Jennifer Grotz	"The Last Living Castrato"	New England Review
Thom Gunn	"The Dump"	The Threepenny Review
Mark Halliday	"Before"	Xconnect
Barbara Hamby	"Ode to the Lost Luggage Warehouse at the Rome Airport"	Five Points
Forrest Hamer	"Goldsboro Narratives"	Callaloo
Brenda Hillman	"Air for Mercury"	Boston Review
Marsha Janson	"Considering the Demise of Everything"	Harvard Review
Mark Jarman	"Epistle"	Meridian
Patricia Spears Jones	"Ghosts"	Crab Orchard Review
Rodney Jones	"Plea for Forgiveness"	The Atlantic Monthly
Donald Justice	"Ralph: A Love Story"	The New Criterion
Olena Kalytiak Davis	"Six Apologies, Lord"	The Antioch Review
David Kirby	"At the Grave of Harold Goldstein"	Parnassus (1973 magazine)
Carolyn Kizer	"The Oration"	The Threepenny Review
Lynne Knight	"The Muse of the Actual"	The Southern Review
Yusef Komunyakaa	"The Goddess of Quotas Laments"	TriQuarterly
Thomas Lux	"Henry Clay's Mouth"	The Atlantic Monthly
Lynne McMahon	"We Take Our Children to Ireland"	The Southern Review
W. S. Merwin	"The Hours of Darkness"	Poetry
Susan Mitchell	"Lost Parrot"	The Atlantic Monthly
Jean Nordhaus	"Aunt Lily and Frederick the Great"	The Gettysburg Review
Mary Oliver	"Work"	The Southern Review
Michael Palmer	"I Do Not"	American Poetry Review
Paul Perry	"Paris"	Callaloo
Carl Phillips	"'All art...'"	Boulevard
Robert Pinsky	"Samurai Song"	The New Yorker
Donald Platt	"History & Bikinis"	Shenandoah
Stanley Plumly	"Kunitz Tending Roses"	Poetry
Lawrence Raab	"Permanence"	The Virginia Quarterly Review
Thomas Rabbitt	"The Beach at Falmouth Heights, Summer, 1952"	Black Warrior Review
Mary Jo Salter	"Au Pair"	Poetry
Rebecca Seiferle	"Welcome to Ithaca"	Partisan Review
Brenda Shaughnessy	"Postfeminism"	Chelsea
Laurie Sheck	from "Black Series"	Seneca Review
Reginald Shepherd	"Semantics at Four P.M."	American Letters & Commentary (magazine)
Richard Siken	"The Dislocated Room"	Indiana Review
Cathy Song	"Mother of Us All"	Shenandoah
Gary Soto	"Chit-Chat with the Junior League Women"	Poetry
Gabriel Spera	"In a Field Outside the Town"	Poetry
A. E. Stallings	"Asphodel"	Beloit Poetry Journal
Susan Stewart	"Wings"	American Poetry Review
Adrienne Su	"The English Canon"	New Letters
Pamela Sutton	"There Is a Lake of Ice on the Moon"	American Poetry Review
Dorothea Tanning	"No Palms"	The Yale Review
Natasha Trethewey	"Limen"	New England Review
Quincy Troupe	"Song"	Tin House
Reetika Vazirani	"Rahim Multani"	Meridian
Paul Violi	"As I Was Telling David and Alexandra Kelley"	The World
Derek Walcott	"Pissarro at Dusk"	The New Republic
Richard Wilbur	"Fabrications"	The Yale Review
Susan Wood	"Analysis of the Rose as Sentimental Despair"	Ploughshares
John Yau	"Borrowed Love Poems"	Boston Review
Dean Young	"The Infirmament"	New American Writing

== Best American poems of the twentieth century ==
For this book in the series, Lehman, the general editor "invited his 14 past and present guest editors to list their choices for 15 best poems of the century. Most did, but Adrienne Rich refused flat out, and Louise Glück wrote a thoughtful letter, also declining. It said, in part: 'There can't be, I think, the best of the great ... What remains is preference.'"

From the responses Lehman got, he drew up a composite list of 32 poets whose work was nominated by at least two guest editors. In alphabetical order:

- A. R. Ammons
- W. H. Auden
- John Ashbery
- John Berryman
- Elizabeth Bishop
- Gwendolyn Brooks
- Hart Crane
- Robert Creeley
- T. S. Eliot
- Robert Frost
- Robert Hayden
- Langston Hughes
- Randall Jarrell
- Kenneth Koch
- Robert Lowell
- James Merrill
- Marianne Moore
- Frank O'Hara
- Sylvia Plath
- Ezra Pound
- Kenneth Rexroth
- Edwin Arlington Robinson
- Theodore Roethke
- James Schuyler
- Delmore Schwartz
- William Stafford
- Gertrude Stein
- Wallace Stevens
- Robert Penn Warren
- Richard Wilbur
- William Carlos Williams
- James Wright

== See also ==
- 2000 in poetry
