= The Best of the Best American Poetry 1988–1997 =

The Best of the Best American Poetry 1988–1997, a volume in The Best American Poetry series, was edited by David Lehman and by guest editor Harold Bloom, who chose the poems.

Bloom selected poems from every entry in the series through 1997, with the exception of the 1996 volume, edited by Adrienne Rich. Bloom criticized the 1996 issue in his introductory essay, claiming that Rich had selected poems based on the "race, gender, sexual orientation, ethnic origin, and political purpose of the would-be poet", rather than on aesthetic merit. Lehman wrote in his own introductory essay that he believed a number of Rich's selections would have met Bloom's criteria, and that he disagreed with Bloom's decision to exclude any poems from Rich's editorship.

== Critical reaction ==
The Boston Review printed Bloom's preface and in the following issue included responses from, among others, Mark Doty, Ann Lauterbach, Rita Dove, J. D. McClatchy, Donald Revell, Heather McHugh, Thylias Moss, Reginald Shepherd, Carol Muske, Sven Birkerts, and Marjorie Perloff.

Of "Best of" anthologies generally, JoAnn Gutin wrote in Salon.com, "Those who pride themselves on the catholicity or adventurousness of their reading tastes may well take a dim view of the 'Best of' boom. I can envision intellectuals saying, with a certain hauteur, 'I would never allow someone to choose what I read.' These are probably the same people who ask for menu substitutions in nice restaurants...or who walk around looking like the wrath of God under the impression that they have a 'personal style.' My position is, if it's good enough for John Updike or Joyce Carol Oates or Harold Bloom, it's good enough for me."

In a 2025 retrospective of The Best American Poetry series in general, Elisa Gabbert, a poetry columnist for The New York Times, poked fun at Bloom, describing his preface as "wildly, hilariously bitter and reactionary." She also argued that Bloom undermined his own message when he called his selections "a heap of all the best I could find".

== Poets and poems included ==
Poet	Poem	Edition year in which poem previously appeared
Jonathan Aaron	"Dance Mania"	1992
A. R. Ammons	"Anxiety's Prosody "	1989
A. R. Ammons	"Garbage"	1993
A. R. Ammons	from "Strip""	1997
John Ashbery	"Baked Alaska"	1993
John Ashbery	"Myrtle"	1994
John Ashbery	"The Problem of Anxiety"	1997
Elizabeth Bishop	"It is Marvellous . . ."	1989
George Bradley	"The Fire Fetched Down"	1994
Lucie Brock-Broido	"Inevitably, She Declined"	1992
Anne Carson	"The Life of Towns"	1990
Amy Clampitt	"My Cousin Muriel"	1990
Douglas Crase	"True Solar Holiday"	1989
Carolyn Creedon	"litany"	1993
Thomas M. Disch	"The Cardinal Detoxes: A Play in One Act"	1994
Irving Feldman	"Terminal Laughs"	1995
Aaron Fogel	"The Printers Error"	1995
Alice Fulton	"Powers of Congress"	1989
Allen Ginsberg	"Salutations to Fernando Pessoa"	1995
Louise Glück	"Celestial Music"	1991
Louise Glück	"Vespers"	1992
Jorie Graham	"Manifest Destiny"	1992
Jorie Graham	"What the Instant Contains"	1993
Allen Grossman	"The Piano Player Explains Himself"	1988
Donald Hall	"Prophecy"	1988
Donald Hall	"The Porcelain Couple"	1997
Vicki Hearne	"St. Luke Painting the Virgin"	1992
Anthony Hecht	"Prospects"	1995
Edward Hirsch	"Man on a Fire Escape"	1992
John Hollander	"Kinneret"	1989
John Hollander	"An Old-Fashioned Song"	1990
John Hollander	"The See-Saw"	1991
Richard Howard	"Like Most Revelations"	1992
Donald Justice	"Nostalgia of the Lakefronts"	1988
Donald Justice	"Invitation to a Ghost"	1993
Brigit Pegeen Kelly	"The White Pilgrim: Old Christian Cemetery"	1993
Jane Kenyon	"Three Songs at the End of the Summer"	1989
Galway Kinnell	"When One Has Lived a Long Time Alone"	1990
Karl Kirchwey	"Sonogram"	1995
Kenneth Koch	"One Train May Hide Another"	1994
Yusef Komunyakaa	"Facing It"	1990
Ann Lauterbach	"Psyches Dream"	1988
Philip Levine	"Scouting"	1990
Harry Mathews	"Histoire"	1988
J. D. McClatchy	"An Essay on Friendship"	1991
James Merrill	"Family Week at Oracle Ranch"	1994
James Merrill	"The 'Ring' Cycle"	1991
James Merrill	"A Room at the Heart of Things"	1989
W.S. Merwin	"The Stranger"	1993
Susan Mitchell	"Havana Birth"	1990
A. F. Moritz	"Protracted Episode"	1991
Thylias Moss	"The Warmth of Hot Chocolate"	1989
Brighde Mullins	"At the Lakehouse"	1994
Molly Peacock	"Have You Ever Faked an Orgasm?"	1995
Bob Perelman	"Movie"	1989
Carl Phillips	"A Mathematics of Breathing"	1994
Kay Ryan	"Outsider Art"	1995
Grace Schulman	"The Present Perfect"	1995
David Shapiro	"The Seasons"	1991
Charles Simic	"Country Fair"	1991
Charles Simic	"The Something"	1997
Gary Snyder	"Ripples on the Surface"	1993
Mark Strand	"Reading in Place"	1989
Mark Strand	from "Dark Harbor"	1993
Mark Strand	"Morning, Noon, and Night"	1997
May Swenson	"Sleeping with Boa"	1994
Derek Walcott	"Omeros"	1991
Rosanna Warren	"The Cormorant"	1990
Rosanna Warren	"Diversion"	1997
Susan Wheeler	"What Memory Reveals"	1988
Richard Wilbur	"Lying"	1997
Richard Wilbur	"A Wall in the Woods: Cummington"	1990
Charles Wright	"Disjecta Membra"	1997
Jay Wright	"Madrid"	1989
Jay Wright	"The Cradle Logic of Autumn"	1995

== See also ==
- 1998 in poetry
