= The Best American Poetry 2003 =

The Best American Poetry 2003, a volume in The Best American Poetry series, was edited by David Lehman and by guest editor Yusef Komunyakaa.

Ron Smith, reviewing the book in the Richmond Times-Dispatch, wrote that Galway Kinnell's When the Towers Fell is "often moving, even if it doesn't manage the fusion of Walt Whitman and T. S. Eliot it aims for." Another poem in the volume focusing on the effects of terrorism is Susan Dickman's Skin. Smith thought the better poems in this edition were by Marilyn Nelson, Rodney Jones, Brigit Pegeen Kelly, Tony Hoagland, and Ted Kooser.

== Poets and poems included ==
Poet	Poem	Publication(s) where poem previously appeared
Jonathan Aaron	"The End of Out of the Past"	The London Review of Books
Beth Anderson	from "A Locked Room"	Poetry Project Newsletter
Nin Andrews	"Dedicated to the One I Love"	Gargoyle
Wendell Berry	"Some Further Words"	American Poetry Review
Frank Bidart	"Curse"	The Threepenny Review
Diann Blakely	"Rambling on My Mind"	Bomb
Bruce Bond	"Art Tatum"	The Paris Review
Catherine Bowman	from "1000 Lines"	TriQuarterly
Rosemary Catacalos	"Perfect Attendance: Short Subjects Made from the Staring Photos of Strangers"	The Progressive
Joshua Clover	"Aeon Flux:June"	Ploughshares
Billy Collins	"Litany"	Poetry
Michael S. Collins	"Six Sketches: When a Soul Breaks"	Callaloo
Carl Dennis	"World History"	Poetry
Susan Dickman	"Skin"	Rhino
Rita Dove	"Fox Trot Fridays"	Callaloo
Stephen Dunn	"Open Door Blues"	Brilliant Corners
Stuart Dybek	"Journal"	Tin House
Charles Fort	"The Vagrant Hours"	Mississippi Review
James Galvin	"Ponderosa"	Boston Review
Amy Gerstler	"An Offer Received in This Morning's Mail:"	American Poetry Review
Louise Glück	"Landscape"	The Threepenny Review
Michael Goldman	"Report on Human Beings"	Ontario Review
Ray Gonzalez	"Max Jacob's Shoes"	New American Writing
Linda Gregg	"Beauty"	The New Yorker
Mark Halliday	"The Opaque"	Colorado Review
Michael S. Harper	"Rhythmic Arrangements (on prosody)"	LUNA
Matthea Harvey	"Sad Little Breathing Machine"	Verse
George V. Higgins	"Villanelle"	88
Edward Hirsch	"The Desire Manuscripts"	The Paris Review
Tony Hoagland	"Summer Night"	88
Richard Howard	"Success"	The New Yorker
Rodney Jones	"Ten Sighs from a Sabbatical"	Five Points
Joy Katz	"Some Rain"	Pleiades
Brigit Pegeen Kelly	"The Dragon"	New England Review
Galway Kinnell	"When the Towers Fell"	The New Yorker
Carolyn Kizer	"After Horace"	Poetry
Jennifer L. Knox	"Love Blooms at Chimsbury After the War"	FIELD
Kenneth Koch	"Proverb"	The New York Review of Books
John Koethe	"Y2K (1933)"	Poetry
Ted Kooser	"In the Hall of Bones"	Third Coast
Philip Levine	"The Music of Time"	Rattle
J. D. McClatchy	"Jihad"	Poetry
W. S. Merwin	"To Zbigniew Herbert's Bicycle"	The New Yorker
Stanley Moss	"A History of Color"	American Poetry Review
Heather Moss	"Dear Alter Ego"	Croonenbergh's Fly
Paul Muldoon	"The Loaf"	The New York Review of Books
Peggy Munson	"Four Deaths That Happened Daily"	Spoon River Poetry Review
Marilyn Nelson	"Asparagus"	Rattapallax
Daniel Nester	"Poem for the Novelist Whom; I Forced to Write a Poem"	Spinning Jenny
Naomi Shihab Nye	"What Happened to Everybody"	LUNA
Ishle Yi Park	"Queen Min Bi"	Barrow Street
Robert Pinsky	"Anniversary"	The Washington Post Magazine
Kevin Prufer	"What the Paymaster Said"	Witness
Ed Roberson	"Sequoia sempervirens"	Callaloo
Vijay Seshadri	"The Disappearances"	The New Yorker
Myra Shapiro	"For Nazim Hikmet in the Old Prison, Now a Four Seasons Hotel"	Rattapallax
Alan Shapiro	"Sleet"	Third Coast
Bruce Smith	"Song with a Child's Pacifier in It"	Boston Review
Charlie Smith	"There's Trouble Everywhere"	Poetry
Maura Stanton	"Translating"	Mid-American Review
Ruth Stone	"Lines"	PMS
James Tate	"The Restaurant Business"	New American Writing
William Tremblay	"The Lost Boy"	LUNA
Natasha Trethewey	"After Your Death"	New England Review
David Wagoner	"On Being Asked to Discuss Poetic Theory"	88
Ronald Wallace	"In a Rut"	Poetry Northwest
Lewis Warsh	"Premonition"	The World
Susan Wheeler	"In Sky"	Boston Review
Richard Wilbur	"Man Running"	The New Yorker
C. K. Williams	"The World"	The New Yorker
Terence Winch	"My Work"	New American Writing
David Wojahn	"Scrabble with Matthews"	Poetry
Robert Wrigley	"Clemency"	The Kenyon Review
Anna Ziegler	"After the Opening, 1932"	The Threepenny Review
Ahmos Zu-Bolton II	"Reading the Bones: a Blackjack Moses nightmare"	American Poetry Review

== See also ==
- 2003 in poetry
