= The Best American Poetry 1992 =

The Best American Poetry 1992 book cover

The Best American Poetry 1992, a volume in The Best American Poetry series, was edited by David Lehman and by guest editor Charles Simic.

In the Forward, Lehman writes, "No critic will ever have the effect on our poets than certain of their grade school teachers had — the ones often credited by the poets themselves for their lifelong devotion to the art."

Lehman's forward also mentioned various public comments about the nation's lack of interest in poetry and questions about its future.

== Poets and poems included ==
Poet	Poem	Where poem previously appeared
Jonathan Aaron	"Dance Mania"	The Paris Review
Agha Shahid Ali	"I See Chile in My Rearview Mirror"	Field
John Ash	"The Ungrateful Citizens"	The Paris Review
John Ashbery	"Poem at the New Year"	The New Yorker
Robin Behn	"Midwestern Villanelle"	Iowa Review
Charles Bernstein	"How I Painted Certain of My Pictures"	Hambone
George Bilgere	"Healing"	Iowa Review
Elizabeth Bishop	"Dear, My Compass..."	The New Yorker
Robert Bly	"The Crippled Godwit"	Ploughshares
Lucie Brock-Broido	"Inevitably, She Declined"	Michigan Quarterly Review
Joseph Brodsky	"Homage to Gerolamo Marcello"	The New Yorker
Hayden Carruth	"Sex"	The Sewanee Review
Billy Collins	"Nostalgia"	The Georgia Review
Robert Creeley	"Other"	Grand Street
Kathleen de Azevedo	"Famous Women--Claudette Colbert"	Fine Madness
Carl Dennis	"Spring Letter"	Poetry
Deborah Digges	"My Amaryllis"	Ploughshares
Stephen Dunn	"Smiles"	Iowa Review
Susan Firer	"The Bright Waterfall of Angels"	Iowa Review
Alice Fulton	"A Little Heart-to-Heart with the Horizon"	Ploughshares
Tess Gallagher	"We're All Pharaohs When We Die"	The Paris Review
Amy Gerstler	"On Wanting to Grow Horns"	Witness
Jack Gilbert	"Voices Inside and Out"	Ploughshares
Louise Glück	"Vespers"	The New Yorker
Jill Gonet	"Body Will"	ZYZZYVA
Jorie Graham	"Manifest Destiny"	Michigan Quarterly Review
Allen Grossman	"Poland of Death (IV)"	Tikkun
Marilyn Hacker	"Elysian Fields"	The Paris Review
Donald Hall	"Spring Glen Grammar School"	The New Yorker
Daniel Halpern	"Infidelities"	The Paris Review
Robert Hass	"My Mother's Nipples"	Michigan Quarterly Review
Vickie Hearne	"St. Luke Painting the Virgin"	Raritan
Juan Felipe Herrera	"Iowa Blues Bar Spiritual"	New England Review
Edward Hirsch	"Man on a Fire Escape"	The New Yorker
Daniel Hoffman	"Identities"	Boulevard
John Hollander	"Days of Autumn"	Grand Street
Richard Howard	"Like Most Revelations"	Boston Phoenix
Lynda Hull	"Lost Fugue for Chet"	The Kenyon Review
Lawrence Joseph	"Some Sort of Chronicler I Am"	The Kenyon Review
Galway Kinnell	"The Man on the Hotel Room Bed"	The Ohio Review
Carolyn Kizer	"Twelve O'clock"	The Paris Review
Phyllis Koestenbaum	"Admission of Failure"	Epoch
Sharon Krinsky	"Mystery Stories"	Brooklyn Review
Maxine Kumin	"Saga: Four Variations on the Sonnet"	Ploughshares
Evelyn Lao	"Green"	Michigan Quarterly Review
Li-Young Lee	"This Hour and What Is Dead"	Ploughshares
Dionisio D. Martínez	"Across These Landscapes of Early Darkness"	Iowa Review
Mekeel McBride	"All Hallows' Eve"	North American Review
James McCorkle	"" . . .The Storm is Passing Over"; She Sang"	Verse
Jerry McGuire	"Terminal"	Callaloo
Sandra McPherson	"Choosing an Author for Assurance in the Night"	Field
Robert Morgan	"Honey"	The Atlantic Monthly
Thylias Moss	"An Anointing"	Epoch
Carol Muske	"Red Trousseau"	American Poetry Review
Mary Oliver	"Rain"	Poetry
Michael Palmer	"Eighth Sky"	Grand Street
Robert Pinsky	"Avenue"	Boston Phoenix
Lawrence Raab	"The Sudden Appearance of a Monster at a Window"	Denver Quarterly
Liam Rector	"The Night the Lightning Bugs; Lit Last in the Field; Then Went Their Way"	AGNI
Donald Revell	"Plenitude"	New Letters
Adrienne Rich	"For a Friend in Travail"	Poetry
Len Roberts	"We Sat, So Patient"	Boulevard
Lynda Schraufnagel	"Trial"	Western Humanities Review
Elizabeth Spires	"Good Friday. Driving Westward."	The New Criterion
Rachel Srubas	"I Want to Marry You"	Another Chicago Magazine
David St. John	"Lucifer in Starlight"	Denver Quarterly
Richard Tillinghast	"Anatolian Journey"	The New Yorker
Lewis Turco	"Kamelopard"	The Formalist
Chase Twichell	"Word Silence"	The Yale Review
Rosanna Warren	"Necrophiliac"	The Atlantic Monthly
Ioanna-Veronika Warwick	"Eyeglasses"	Exquisite Corpse
C. K. Williams	"The Knot"	Antaeus
Charles Wright	"Winter-Worship"	Field
Franz Wright	"Depiction of Childhood"	Field
Stephen Yenser	"Vertumnal"	The Yale Review

== Publications most frequently represented ==
In order of frequency, these are the publications most represented this year:

The New Yorker	7
Paris Review	6
Ploughshares	6
The Iowa Review	5
Field	4
Michigan Quarterly Review	4
The Atlantic Monthly	2
Boulevard	2
Denver Quarterly	2
Grand Street	2
The Kenyon Review	2
Poetry	2
The Yale Review	2

== See also ==
- 1992 in poetry
