= The Best American Poetry 2001 =

The Best American Poetry 2001, a volume in The Best American Poetry series, was edited by David Lehman and by guest editor Robert Hass.

== Background ==
In his introduction, Hass wrote, "There are roughly three traditions in American poetry at this point: a metrical tradition that can be very nervy and that is also basically classical in impulse; a strong central tradition of free verse made out of both romanticism and modernism, split between the impulses of an inward and psychological writing and an outward and realist one, at its best fusing the two; and an experimental tradition that is usually more passionate about form than content, perception than emotion, restless with the conventions of the art, skeptical about the political underpinnings of current practice, and intent on inventing a new one, or at least undermining what seems repressive in the current formed style. [...] At the moment there are poets doing good, bad, and indifferent work in all these ranges."

Speaking of the selection process for his editorship, Hass observed that he received "boxes...[of] xeroxes and notations of the indefatigable David Lehman....I had marked for rereading a couple of hundred poems [myself] and I had David's sometimes overlapping lists..." .

Maureen McLane, in a book review in The Chicago Tribune, said of Hass' description that "it's hard to imagine a more judicious account of major tendencies."

"While many charming, witty poems have made it into this anthology, there are plenty of others that would seem to evade not only the perils of being charming but indeed the strictures of being a poem, conventionally understood," McLane wrote. She found the selections by Joshua Clover Thomas Sayers Ellis, Cal Bedient, Robert Bly, Michael Burkard and Claudia Rankine confusing (but not necessarily bad poems for that reason), and praised the work by Brenda Hillman, Louise Glück, Alan Feldman, Bernard Welt, Joshua Clover, Thomas Sayers Ellis, Fanny Howe, Michael Palmer, Lydia Davis, Rachel Rose, David Kirby, Jewelle Gomez, Noelle Kocot and Grace Paley.

Hass also included newly published work by the late Elizabeth Bishop and James Schuyler. Schuyler's poem was discovered by David Lehman in May 1994 in John Ashbery's archive at Harvard's Houghton Library and appeared six years later in "The New Yorker". One of the poems Hass chose for the volume was by his wife, Brenda Hillman.

== Poets and poems included ==
Poet	Poem	Where poem previously appeared
Nin Andrews	"Notes for a Sermon on the Mount"	Another Chicago Magazine
Rae Armantrout	"The Plan"	American Poetry Review
John Ashbery	"Crossroads in the Past"	The New York Review of Books
Angela Ball	"Jazz"	The Nebraska Review
Mary Jo Bang	"Crossed-Over, Fiend-Snitched, X-ed Out"	New American Writing
Cal Bedient	"When the Gods Put on Meter"	Colorado Review
Elizabeth Bishop	"Vague Poem"	The New Yorker
Robert Bly	"The French Generals"	The Paris Review
Lee Ann Brown	"Sonnet Around Stephanie"	Verse
Michael Burkard	"Notes About My Face"	American Poetry Review
Trent Busch	"Heartland"	The Nation
Amina Calil	"Blouse of Felt"	Faucheuse
Anne Carson	"Longing, a documentary"	The Threepenny Review
Joshua Clover	"Ceriserie"	American Poetry Review
Billy Collins	"Snow Day"	The Atlantic Monthly
Robert Creeley	"En Famille"	Boston Book Review
Lydia Davis	"A Mown Lawn"	McSweeney's
R. Erica Doyle	"Ma Ramon"	Callaloo
Christopher Edgar	"The Cloud of Unknowing"	Boston Review
Thomas Sayers Ellis	"T.A.P.O.A.F.O.M."	AGNI
Amy England	"The Art of the Snake Story"	Quarter After Eight
Alan Feldman	"Contemporary American Poetry"	Poetry
James Galvin	"Little Dantesque"	Fence
Louise Glück	"Time"	The New Yorker
Jewelle Gomez	"My Chakabuku Mama: a comic tale"	Callaloo
Jorie Graham	"Gulls"	Conjunctions
Linda Gregerson	"Waterborne"	The Atlantic Monthly
Linda Gregg	"The Singers Change, The Music Goes On"	AGNI
Allen Grossman	"Enough rain for Agnes Walquist"	The Southern Review
Donald Hall	"Her Garden"	The Times Literary Supplement
Anthony Hecht	"Sarabande on Attaining the Age of Seventy-Seven"	The New Yorker
Lyn Hejinian	"Nights"	Conjunctions
Brenda Hillman	"The Formation of Soils"	The Journal
Jane Hirshfield	"In Praise of Coldness"	Tin House
John Hollander	"What the Lovers in the Old Songs Thought"	The New Republic
Richard Howard	"After 65"	The Antioch Review
Fanny Howe	"Doubt"	Seneca Review
Olena Kalytiak Davis	"Sweet Reader, Flanneled and Tulled"	The Paris Review
Shirley Kaufman	"The Emperor of China"	American Poetry Review
Galway Kinnell	"The Quick and the Dead"	The New Yorker
David Kirby	"Dear Derrida"	The Kenyon Review
Carolyn Kizer	"The Ashes"	The Texas Review
Kenneth Koch	"To World War Two"	Harper's
Noelle Kocot	"Consolations Before an Affair, Upper West Side"	Another Chicago Magazine
John Koethe	"Songs of the Valley"	Southwest Review
Yusef Komunyakaa	"Seven Deadly Sins"	Poetry
Mark Levine	"Wedding Day"	Northwest Review
Sarah Manguso	"The Rider"	American Letters & Commentary
J. D. McClatchy	"Tattoos"	The Paris Review
Colleen J. McElroy	"Mae West Chats It Up with Bessie Smith"	Crab Orchard Review
Heather McHugh	"My One"	jubilat
Harryette Mullen	"Music for Homemade Instruments"	Facture
Carol Muske Dukes	"Our Kitty"	Evansville Review
Alice Notley	"Where Leftover Misery Goes"	Chain
Sharon Olds	"His Costume"	The New Yorker
Kathleen Ossip	"The Nature of Things"	Barrow Street
Grace Paley	"Here"	The Massachusetts Review
Michael Palmer	"Untitled (February 2000)"	Conjunctions
John Peck	"A Metal Denser Than, and Liquid"	AGNI
Lucia Perillo	"The Ghost Shirt"	Pequod
Carl Phillips	"The Clearing"	Callaloo
Robert Pinsky	"Jersey Rain"	The Atlantic Monthly
Claudia Rankine	"A short narrative of breasts and womb in service of Plot entitled"	Verse
Adrienne Rich	"Architect"	The Paris Review
James Richardson	"Vectors: Forty-five Aphorisms and Ten-second Essays"	Ploughshares
Rachel Rose	"What We Heard About the Japanese" and "What the Japanese Perhaps Heard""	Verse
Mary Ruefle	"Furtherness"	American Letters & Commentary
James Schuyler	"Along Overgrown Paths"	The New Yorker
Charles Simic	"Night Picnic"	Boston Review
Susan Stewart	"Apple"	TriQuarterly
Larissa Szporluk	"Meteor"	The Journal
James Tate	"The Diagnosis"	LIT
Bernard Welt	"I stopped writing poetry..."	The Antioch Review
Dean Young	"Sources of the Delaware"	Volt
Rachel Zucker	"In Your Version of Heaven I Am Younger"	American Poetry Review

== See also ==
- 2001 in poetry
