= Denver Quarterly =

American avant-garde literary magazine

- Editor-in-chief: W. Scott Howard
- Categories: Literary magazine
- Frequency: Quarterly
- First issue: 1966
- Company: University of Denver
- Country: United States
- Website: liberalarts.du.edu/english/journals-initiatives/denver-quarterly
- ISSN: 0011-8869
- OCLC: 1566260

The Denver Quarterly (known as The University of Denver Quarterly until 1970) is a literary magazine based at the University of Denver. It was founded in 1966 by novelist John Edward Williams.

== Publisher ==
The magazine is published by the Department of English & Literary Arts at the University of Denver. It has published poems by many poets.

== The Best American Short Stories ==
Stories from the magazine have twice been included in The Best American Short Stories: Margaret Shipley's The Tea Bowl of Ninsel Nomura, in 1969, and in 1977 Baine Kerr's Rider. Victor Kolpacoff's The Journey to Rutherford received an Honorable Mention in the 1970 anthology, Walter Benesch received a similar notation for The Double in 1971, and John P. Fox got one for Torchy and My Old Man (also in 1971).

== The Best American Essays ==
Three essays have had honorable mentions in The Best American Essays: Gabriel Hudson's The Sky Hermit in 1986, Stanley Elkin's What's in a Name? Etc in 1988, and Albert Goldbarth's Wind-up Sushi: With Catalogues and Instructions for Assembly in 1990.

== The Best American Poetry ==
- In The Best American Poetry 1990 the poems First Song/Bankei/1653/ by Stephen Berg, Climbing Out of the Cage by Virginia Hooper, and Distance from Loved Ones by James Tate.
- In The Best American Poetry 1992 the poems The Sudden Appearance of a Monster at a Window by Lawrence Raab and Lucifer in Starlight by David St. John.
- In The Best American Poetry 1997 the poems from 'A Summer Evening, by Geoffrey Nutter and Helicopter Wrecked on a Hill by Christine Hume.
- In The Best American Poetry 1998 the poems Past All Understanding by Heather McHugh and A Calm November. Sunday in the Fields, by Sidney Wade.
- In The Best American Poetry 2000 the poem The Year, by Janet Bowdan.
- In The Best American Poetry 2005 the poem In the Graveyard of Fallen Monuments, by Rachel Loden.
- In The Best American Poetry 2007 the poem Dear Pearce & Pearce, Inc, by Danielle Pafunda.

== Other awards ==
Stephen Berg won a Pushcart Prize for his poem First Song/Bankei/1653/, which also was included in Best American Poetry 1990.

In 1990, Joanne Greenberg won an O. Henry Award for her short story Elizabeth Baird, originally published in the Fall 1989 issue.

== Editors ==
The first editor-in-chief was John Edward Williams (1965-1970). Others have included Jim Clark, Leland Chambers (1977-1983), Donald Revell (1988-1994), Bin Ramke (1994-2011, 2016—2019), Laird Hunt (2012–2016), and W. Scott Howard (2019—present).
