= Karl Kirchwey =

American writer

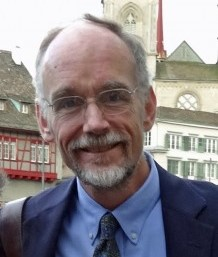
- Kirchwey in Zurich, Switzerland in 2014
- Born: February 25, 1956 (age 69)
- Education: Yale College (BA); Columbia University (MA)
- Occupations: Poet, translator, teacher, literary curator
- Notable work: The Engrafted Word; 1998 "A Wandering Island"; 1990

Karl Kirchwey (born February 25, 1956) is an American poet, essayist, translator, critic, teacher, arts administrator, and literary curator. His career has taken place both inside and outside of academia. He is Professor of English and Creative Writing at Boston University, where he teaches in the MFA programs in Creative Writing (Poetry) and Literary Translation, as well as in the Classics and English departments. His published work includes seven books of poems, two poetry anthologies, and a translation of French poet Paul Verlaine’s first book of poems.

== Early life and education ==
Kirchwey was born in Boston, Massachusetts to Ellen Douglas (née Allen) and George W. Kirchwey, an executive for a multinational company. His family moved frequently during his childhood, including periods in Massachusetts, California, Connecticut, Quebec (Canada), London (U.K.) and Lausanne (Switzerland). He attended high school at Aiglon College (Switzerland) and Phillips Academy (Massachusetts). He received a B.A. from Yale College, where he was a student of John Hollander, J.D. McClatchy and Penelope Laurans, and an M.A. in English Literature from Columbia University.

== Personal life ==
Kirchwey married Tamzen Flanders in 1988. They have two adult children.

== Career ==
Kirchwey has taught at the secondary school level at The American School in Switzerland (TASIS) and Elizabeth Irwin High School (New York City). At the college level, he has taught at Smith College, Wesleyan, Yale and Columbia universities and at Bryn Mawr College, where he served as Director of Creative Writing (2000–2010). Since 2014, he has been Professor of English and Creative Writing at Boston University, where he teaches in the MFA Program in Creative Writing and in the MFA degree program in Literary Translation. His career as an arts administrator and literary curator has included service as the Director of the Unterberg Poetry Center of the 92nd Street Y in New York (1987–2000) and the Andrew Heiskell Arts Director at the American Academy in Rome (2010–13). At the college and university level, he has taught in and directed the Creative Writing Program at Bryn Mawr College (2000–10), directed the MFA Program in Creative Writing at Boston University (2014–16; 2025-present), and served as Associate Dean of Faculty for the Humanities in the College of Arts & Sciences at Boston University (2017–22).

== Literary work ==
From the beginning, Kirchwey's work has been distinguished by its geographical and temporal range, with settings in Europe and North America, both in the worlds of ancient Greece and Rome and of the contemporary United States. In a comment on Kirchwey's third book, poet and critic John Hollander asserted that Kirchwey "has become even more profoundly the elegiac poet of places and sited moments, more than merely skillful and interpretively adroit".

Kirchwey's first magazine publications as a poet included The New Yorker, The New Republic, The Yale Review, Prairie Schooner, The Paris Review, Shenandoah, The Southwest Review, The Massachusetts Review, The Nation, and The New Criterion. These poems were gathered in his first book, A Wandering Island (1990), which received the Norma Farber First Book Award from the Poetry Society of America.

His third book, The Engrafted Word (1998), included work arising from a Rome Prize and a Guggenheim Fellowship year spent in the city of Rome with his family, and was designated a “Notable Book of the Year” by The New York Times.

His fifth book, The Happiness of This World: Poetry and Prose (2007) resulted from a trip to Saipan (Northern Marianas Islands), Cambodia, and India, and included an extended hybrid essay in poetry and prose entitled “A Yatra for Yama.” A second book of Roman poems, Stumbling Blocks, followed in 2017. This book took its title from the Holocaust memorial art project by German artist Gunter Demnig.

Throughout his career, Kirchwey has occasionally translated poetry, primarily from French and Italian. His translation of poet Paul Verlaine's first book appeared in 2011 as Poems Under Saturn, and his volume of translations entitled More Honor in Betrayal: Selected Poems 1965–1984 by Italian poet Giovanni Giudici (1924–2011) is forthcoming.

While working at the American Academy in Rome, Kirchwey prepared literary walking itineraries, and these gave rise to his first anthology, Roman Poems, gathering mostly English-language poems about the Eternal City from the Renaissance to the present. His second anthology, Poems of Healing, was begun before the COVID pandemic. His own work has been widely anthologized, including four times in The Best American Poetry (1991, 1995, 1998, 2018), and in The Best of the Best American Poetry, 1987–1998.

Kirchwey's essays and reviews have appeared in Literary Imagination, The New York Times Book Review, Parnassus: Poetry in Review, The Philadelphia Inquirer, Provincetown Arts, Slate, Stagebill (New York City Opera), and elsewhere. Several of a set of linked hybrid essays (memoir, poetry, history, family correspondence) concerning ambiguous loss and the legacy of World War II have appeared or are forthcoming in Arion, AGNI, The American Scholar, The Hudson Review, The Hopkins Review, and Raritan.

Kirchwey's long poem-in-progress is called Mutabor, and portions of it have been published in journals including Little Star, Arion, AGNI, The Antioch Review, Literary Imagination, The Yale Review, and Raritan. He has also written a verse drama entitled Airdales & Cipher, an adaptation of the Alcestis of Euripides. His eighth book of poems, Good Apothecary, is forthcoming from Northwestern University Press.

== Bibliography ==
=== Poetry ===
- Stumbling Blocks: Roman Poems, TriQuarterly/Northwestern University Press, 2017
- Mount Lebanon (poems), Marian Wood Books/G.P. Putnam's Sons, 2011
- The Happiness of This World: Poems and Prose, Marian Wood Books/G.P. Putnam's Sons, 2007
- At the Palace of Jove (poems), Marian Wood Books/ G.P. Putnam's Sons, 2002
- The Engrafted Word (poems), Henry Holt and Company, 1998 (New York Times “Notable Book of the Year”)
- Those I Guard (poems), Harcourt, Brace and Company, 1993
- A Wandering Island (poems), Princeton University Press, 1990

=== Translation ===
- Poems Under Saturn, a translation of Paul Verlaine's Poèmes saturniens (1866), Princeton University Press, 2011

=== Anthologies (edited) ===
- Poems of Healing (edited), an anthology of world poems from antiquity to the present, Everyman's Library, 2021
- Poems of Rome (edited), an anthology of poems from the Renaissance to the present, Everyman's Library, 2018

== Honors and awards ==
- Cato Prize for Poetry (awarded by the Classics Conclave), 2015
- Rosalyn R. Schwartz Teaching Award, Bryn Mawr College, 2003
- The Engrafted Word named a “Notable Book of the Year” by The New York Times, 1998
- The Paris Review Prize for Poetic Drama, 1997
- National Endowment for the Arts Literature Fellowship (Poetry), 1996
- John Simon Guggenheim Memorial Foundation Fellowship (Poetry), 1994
- Rome Prize Fellowship (American Academy in Rome), 1994
- Ingram Merrill Foundation Fellowship, 1993
- Norma Farber First Book Award (Poetry Society of America), 1991
