= Trần Vàng Sao =

Vietnamese poet (born 1942)

Tran Vang Sao (born Nguyễn Đính in 1942) is a Vietnamese poet.

He was born in Huế, where he now lives. His father was killed by the French during the First Indochina War. During the Vietnam War, he was a contributor to the underground newspaper Thanh Niên Chống Mỹ [Youths against America]. He joined the National Liberation Front in 1965, lived in areas under its control, broadcasting propaganda until 1969, when he was injured and removed to the north. In spite of his allegiance to the Communist cause during the war—his pen name, "Vàng Sao", means "Yellow Star", a reference to the national flag—he has been blacklisted since 1972.

He had been imprisoned, and his manuscripts have been confiscated. His poems have been translated into English and published in the journals American Poetry Review (Vol.28/No.1, Jan/Feb 1999) and The Literary Review (Winter 1999).
