= Jane Mead =

American poet (1958–2019)

- Born: August 13, 1958; Baltimore, Maryland
- Died: September 8, 2019 (aged 61); Napa County, California
- Education: Vassar College; Syracuse University; University of Iowa
- Occupation: Poet

Jane Mead (August 13, 1958 – September 8, 2019) was an American poet and the author of five poetry collections. Her last volume was To the Wren: Collected & New Poems 1991-2019 (Alice James Books, 2019). Her honors included fellowships from the Lannan and Guggenheim foundations and a Whiting Award. Her poems appeared in literary journals and magazines including Ploughshares, Electronic Poetry Review, The American Poetry Review, The New York Times, the Virginia Quarterly Review, and The Antioch Review and in anthologies including The Best American Poetry 1990.

Born in Baltimore, Mead lived in Cambridge, Massachusetts, until she was twelve. Her father taught ichthyology at Harvard University. After Cambridge, she moved around a great deal with her mother and stepfather, who was a journalist, living in New Mexico, London, and Cambridge, England. She graduated from Vassar College and from Syracuse University and the University of Iowa. She taught and was Poet-in-Residence at Wake Forest University.

After her father died in 2003, Mead managed the family ranch in Napa County, Northern California. She taught at New England College and co-owned Prairie Lights in Iowa City, Iowa.

Mead died September 8, 2019, in Napa, from cancer.

== Honors and awards ==
- 2017 World of Made and Unmade shortlisted for 2017 Griffin Poetry Prize
- 2004 Ploughshares Cohen Award
- 2002 Guggenheim Fellowship
- 1992 Whiting Award
- Lannan Foundation Completion Grant

== Bibliography ==
=== Poetry ===
Collections

- To the Wren: Collected & New Poems 1991-2019. Alice James Books. 2019. ISBN 978-1-948579-01-8.
- World of Made and Unmade. Alice James Books. 2016. ISBN 978-1-938584-32-9.
- Money Money Money I Water Water Water. Alice James Books. 2014. ISBN 978-1-938584-04-6.
- The Usable Field. Alice James Books. 2008. ISBN 978-1-882295-69-2.
- House of Poured-Out Waters. University of Illinois Press. 2001. ISBN 978-0-252-06944-4.
- The Lord and the General Din of the World. Sarabande Books. 1996. ISBN 978-0-9641151-1-8.

Anthologies (edited)

- Jane Mead, ed. (1994). Many and More: A Celebration of Love in Later Life. Timken Publishers. ISBN 978-0-943221-21-2.

Anthologised in

- Melissa Tuckey, ed. (2018). Ghost Fishing : An Eco-Justice Poetry Anthology. University of Georgia Press. ISBN 978-0820353159.

List of poems

Title	Year	First published	Reprinted/collected
I wonder if I will miss the moss	2021	Mead, Jane (September 20, 2021). "I wonder if I will miss the moss". The New Yorker. 97 (29): 42.	
