= The Gettysburg Review =

American literary magazine

- Autumn 1991 issue cover
- Discipline: Literary journal
- Language: English
- Edited by: Mark Drew

Publication details
- History: 1988–2023
- Publisher: Gettysburg College (United States)
- Frequency: Quarterly

Standard abbreviations
- ISO 4: Gettysbg. Rev.

Indexing
- ISSN: 0898-4557

Links
- Journal homepage

The Gettysburg Review was a quarterly literary magazine featuring short stories, poetry, essays and reviews. Work that appeared in the magazine has been reprinted in "best-of" anthologies and received awards.

The magazine was "recognized as one of the country's premier journals," according to a description at the Web site of the New York Public Library. The 2007 U.S. News guide to the best colleges described the review as "recognized as one of the country's best literary journals." According to a Web page of the English Department of the University of Wisconsin Colleges, the Gettysburg Review is considered a "major literary journal in the U.S."

== History ==
Founded in 1988, the magazine was published by Gettysburg College in Gettysburg, Pennsylvania. It came out in quarterly issues in January, April, July, and October. The magazine published its final issue in December 2023.

The magazine did not print material which had been published elsewhere. Along with fresh and new short stories, it was open to publishing original poetry, whether short or long, and excerpts from novels. The magazine occasionally serialized longer fictional works over more than one issue. "Essays can be on virtually any subject, so long as it is treated in a literary fashion — gracefully and in depth," according to the magazine's website.

The Gettysburg Review was one of the most frequent sources of material for The Best American Essays, The Best American Poetry, and The Best American Short Stories series. Other anthologies that have reprinted work originally published in the magazine: The Pushcart Prize: Best of the Small Presses, The Best Creative Nonfiction, The Best American Mystery Stories, Best New American Voices, Best New Poets, New Stories from the South, and Prize Stories: The O. Henry Awards. Other work has been reprinted in publications such as Harpers and the UTNE Reader.

Prominent writers who have appeared in the magazine's pages include E. L. Doctorow, Rita Dove, Joyce Carol Oates, Jeffrey Eugenides, Linda Pastan, James Tate, and Donald Hall. Writers published in the final issue of the journal include Angie Estes, Christopher Howell, Samyak Shertok, Leslie Pietrzyk, Lenya Krow, Albert Goldbarth, Alpay Ulku, Alice Friman, Margaret Gibson, Jesse Lee Kercheval, and others. The issue also features paintings by Michael Alvarez.

The periodical won awards including the Best New Journal award, four Best Journal Design awards from the Council of Editors of Learned Journals, and a PEN/Nora Magid Award for Excellence in Editing.

In a 1994 review of the magazine, Ron Tanner wrote that the stories in the 1993 issues were widely varied in style, but "are clearly in the mainstream of contemporary American fiction — you will not find 'experimental' work in The Gettysburg Review."

He also found the stories have a common "concern for character, and an examination of the emotional and psychological distance one might travel when faced with a problem. [...] each compels the character to make a decision, to make an effort, to make a move. Consequently, things happen in these stories. Which is to say that we end in a place very different from the story's beginning. In no resolution of a Gettysburg story, however, do we find ourselves living Happily Ever After. Life is more complicated than that, these writers assert."

The quarterly received about 6,000 submissions per year and did not solicit work except for occasional reviews. "[W]e work hard not to have a regular stable of writers or favored persons of any kind," said founding editor Peter Stitt. "We are most proud of publishing writers who have never before appeared in a nationally-circulated journal. But we do not actively search through the slush pile for anything but good writing."

When founding editor Peter Stitt retired in 2015, Mark Drew, the magazine's assistant editor since 1998, took over as editor in chief, a position he held until the magazine's closing. Other staff members who served at the Gettysburg Review were assistant editors Frank Graziano and Jeff Mock, and managing editors Emily Ruark Clark, Cara Diaconoff, Mindy Wilson, Kim Dana Kupperman, Ellen Hathaway, Jess Bryant, and Lauren Hohle.

The magazine was supported financially by Gettysburg College, for the most part, although it also received grants from the Pennsylvania Council on the Arts and the NEA, along with revenue from subscriptions.

== Final issue ==
On October 3, 2023, Gettysburg College president Bob Iuliano announced that The Gettysburg Review would publish its final issue in December and then cease publication permanently. The editors of The Gettysburg Review stated that they were never involved in any discussions regarding the termination of the journal.

== Appearances in The Best American Essays ==
- The Best American Essays 2024, James Whorton, "An Upset Place"
- The Best American Essays 2020, Mark Sullivan, "Ode al Vento Occidentale"
- The Best American Essays 2018, Marilyn Abildskov, "The Trick: Notes toward a Theory of Plot"
- The Best American Essays 2014, John Culver, "The Final Day in Rome"
- The Best American Essays 2013, Richard Schmitt, "Sometimes a Romantic Notion"
- The Best American Essays 2010, Ron Rindo, "Gyromancy"
- The Best American Essays 2009, Ryan Van Meter, "First"
- The Best American Essays 2001, Burt O. States, "On Being Breathless"
- The Best American Essays 1998, Sven Birkerts, "States of Reading"
- The Best American Essays 1993, Scott Russell Sanders, "Wayland"
- The Best American Essays 1993, Floyd Skloot, "Trivia Tea: Baseball as Balm"
- The Best American Essays 1989, Mary Hood, "Why Stop?"

== Appearances in The Best American Mystery Stories ==
- The Best American Mystery Stories 2010, Lynda Leidiger, "Tell Me"
- The Best American Mystery Stories 2008, Joyce Carol Oates, "Doll: A Romance of the Mississippi"
- The Best American Mystery Stories 2008, Kyle Minor, "A Day Meant to Do Less"
- The Best American Mystery Stories 2006, Emily Raboteau, "Smile"
- The Best American Mystery Stories 2004, Christopher Coake, "All Through the House"

== Appearances in The Best American Poetry ==
- The Best American Poetry 2024, Michael Waters, "Ashkenazi Birthmark"
- The Best American Poetry 2020, Steve Kleinman, "Bear"
- The Best American Poetry 2020, Shara Lessley, "On Faith"
- The Best American Poetry 2016, Michelle Boisseau, "Ugglig"
- The Best American Poetry 2012, Bruce Snider, "The Drag Queen Dies in New Castle"
- The Best American Poetry 2012, Dean Young, "Restoration Ode"
- The Best American Poetry 2009, Barbara Goldberg, "The Fullness Thereof"
- The Best American Poetry 2006, Bob Hicok, "My career as a director"
- The Best American Poetry 2006, Mark Kraushaar, "Tonight"
- The Best American Poetry 2006, Robert Wrigley, "Religion"
- The Best American Poetry 2000, Jean Nordhaus, "Aunt Lily and Frederick the Great"
- The Best American Poetry 1999, Marcia Southwick, "A Star Is Born in the Eagle Nebula"
- The Best American Poetry 1998, Rebecca McClanahan, "Making Love"
- The Best American Poetry 1998, Eric Ormsby, "Flamingos"
- The Best American Poetry 1997, Herman J. Fong, "Asylum"
- The Best American Poetry 1997, Harry Humes, "The Butterfly Effect"
- The Best American Poetry 1997, Dean Young, "Frottage"
- The Best American Poetry 1995, Elton Glaser, "Undead White European Male"
- The Best American Poetry 1994, Dick Allen "A Short History of the Vietnam War Years"
- The Best American Poetry 1993, Brigit Pegeen Kelly, "The White Pilgrim: Old Christian Cemetery"
- The Best American Poetry 1993, Staley Kunitz, "Chariot"
- The Best American Poetry 1990, Donald Hall, "Praise for Death"
- The Best American Poetry 1990, Edward Kleinschmidt, "Gangue"
- The Best American Poetry 1990, David St. John, "Last Night with Rafaella"
- The Best American Poetry 1989, Beth Bentley, "Northern Idylls"
- The Best American Poetry 1989, Rita Dove, "The Late Notebooks of Albrecht Durer"
- The Best American Poetry 1989, Debora Greger, "In Violet"
- The Best American Poetry 1989, Philip Levine, "Dog Poem"

== Appearances in The Best American Short Stories ==
- The Best American Short Stories 2023, Benjamin Ehrlich, "The Master Mourner"
- The Best American Short Stories 2009, Victoria Lancelotta, "The Anniversary Trip"
- The Best American Short Stories 1999, James Spencer, "The Robbers of Karnataka"

== Masthead ==
The magazine's masthead, as of December 2023:

- Editor: Mark Drew
- Managing Editor: Lauren Hohle
- Editorial Assistants: Christopher Kempf, Corey Van Landingham, and Robert Yune
- Founding Editor: Peter Stitt

Advisory and Contributing Editors:

- Lee K. Abbott
- Rita Dove
- Donald Hall
- Shara McCallum
- Rebecca McClanahan
- Leslie Pietrzyk
- Philip Schultz
- Richard Wilbur
- Paul Zimmer

== See also ==
- List of literary magazines
