= The Best American Poetry 2008 =

The Best American Poetry 2008, a volume in The Best American Poetry series, was edited by poet Charles Wright, guest editor, who made the final selections, and David Lehman, the general editor for the series.

This book is the 21st volume in the most popular annual poetry anthology in the United States.

== See also ==
- 2008 in poetry
