= John Ash (writer) =

Expatriate British poet and writer (1948–2019)

- Born: 29 June 1948; Manchester, England
- Died: 3 December 2019 (aged 71)
- Occupations: poet, writer, travel writer
- Writing career
- Period: 1978–2019

John Ash (29 June 1948 – 3 December 2019) was an expatriate British poet and writer.

His lifelong interest in Byzantium (especially its architecture) was a major theme which ran through his poetry, fiction and travel writing, along with family, friends and the three major cities he has lived in. As well as his books (largely published by Carcanet), his work has appeared in The New Yorker, The New York Times, The Village Voice, The Washington Post and Paris Review.

== Life ==
John Ash was born in Manchester, England in 1948, the son of schoolteachers. With a brief break to attend the University of Birmingham (B.A. 1969) and to take a post-graduation year in Cyprus, he remained in the city of his birth until 1985. In the notes to his first book, a sequence titled Casino, Ash remarked that it had grown "out of several years of research for another project – a prose work which was to have been called "The Mauve Book: In Praise of Decadence". He also noted that titles of some sections and the over-all structure had a musical analogy. Musical references continued in the books he published while still in England.

Moving to New York City in 1985, Ash became associated with the New York School of poets and formed a strong and lasting friendship with its leading proponent, John Ashbery. After stints teaching at the University of Iowa and the University of California, Berkeley, he moved to Istanbul in 1996, where he lived thenceforth, first teaching at Boğaziçi University, before moving to Kadir Has University.

During this time several of his books, including Selected Works and To the City, have appeared in Turkish translations, published by Yapi Kredi Publications, who are affiliated with the bank of the same name. Deluxe editions of The Anatolikon, published in a side-by-side English and Turkish edition by Yapi Kredi, featured illustrations by Peter Hristoff, a noted Turkish artist of Bulgarian Christian origin living in New York.

In a review of To The City, Poetry Magazine said that John Ash "could be the best English poet of his generation". In 2007 he was profiled in The Economist in an article by Hugh Pope, himself an author and formerly the Wall Street Journal correspondent in Istanbul. Pope suggested that Ash was the leading light in a new "Istanbul School" of English-speaking poets taking their inspiration from the city.

Following Byzantine Journey, and other travel writing, Ash led tours of the relevant sites and in 2006 wrote the script for the documentary "Istanbul for Aficionados". He also appeared in a BBC guide to Istanbul, broadcast in 2005 on BBC Four's "Mediterranean Tales" strand.

== Bibliography ==
=== Poetry ===
- In the Wake of the Day (Manchester 2010, ISBN 978-1-84777-044-8).
- The Parthian Stations (Manchester 2007, ISBN 978-1-85754-872-3).
- To the City (Jersey City 2004, ISBN 1-58498-037-0).
- The Anatolikon and To the City (Manchester 2002, ISBN 978-1-85754-560-9).
- The Anatolikon (Jersey City 2000, ISBN 978-1-58498-010-0).
- Selected Poems (Manchester 1996, ISBN 978-1-85754-155-7).
- The Burnt Pages (Manchester 1991, ISBN 978-0-85635-920-0).
- Disbelief (Manchester 1987, ISBN 978-0-85635-695-7), Poetry Book Society Choice.
- The Branching Stairs (Manchester 1984, ISBN 978-0-85635-501-1).
- The Goodbyes (Manchester 1982, ISBN 0-85635-423-6).
- The Bed & Other Poems (London 1981, ISBN 0-903375-58-3), with an introduction by Lee Harwood.
- Casino: A poem in three parts (London 1978, ISBN 978-0-903375-38-2).

=== Non-Fiction ===
- A Byzantine Journey (1995, ISBN 0-679-40934-3).

=== Travel ===
- Turkey, The Other Guide: Western and Southern Anatolia (2001, ISBN 975-08-0277-2).

=== Articles ===
- Field of Ruins in the Sand, The New York Times, 1999, on Sergiopolis
- The Lost Heads of Balbura, The New York Times
- Celebration Istanbul, New York Times Magazine, 2001
- Death by Drowning, The New York Times, 2002, on Yusufeli
- Istanbul's Glitter Domes, The New York Times
- Bulgaria's Venerable Second City, The New York Times, 2004, on Plovdiv
- Review: On the Edge, by Kenneth Koch, The New York Times
- Review: Constantinople: City of the World's Desire, by Philip Mansel, The Washington Post

=== Anthologies ===
His work has also appeared in a number of anthologies, including:

- The Best American Poetry series:
  - The Best American Poetry 1988 (1988)
  - The Best American Poetry 1990 (1990)
  - The Best American Poetry 1991 (1991)
  - The Best American Poetry 1992 (1992)
- The Harvill Book of Twentieth-Century Poetry in English (1999)
- New British Poetry (2004)

== Awards ==
- Whiting Award (1986)
