= The Kenyon Review =

American literary magazine

- Discipline: literary journal
- Language: English
- Edited by: Nicole Terez Dutton

Publication details
- History: 1939-present
- Publisher: Kenyon College (United States)
- Frequency: Quarterly

Standard abbreviations
- ISO 4: Kenyon Rev.

Indexing
- ISSN: 0163-075X
- JSTOR: 0163075X

Links
- Journal homepage

The Kenyon Review is a 501(c)(3) nonprofit literary arts organization housed on the Kenyon College campus in Gambier, Ohio. Founded in 1939, The Review publishes a quarterly journal of fiction, poetry, essays, and reviews.

In addition to its publications, The Kenyon Review supports writers and readers through Youth and Adult Writing Workshops in both residential and online formats, fellowships, contests, and a reading series. Its programs foster an inclusive literary community across genres, aesthetics, and every stage of development.

== History ==
John Crowe Ransom (right) with Robie Macauley as he prepares to become editor of The Kenyon Review in 1959.

The Kenyon Review was founded in 1939 at Kenyon College through the efforts of poet Roberta Teale Swartz and college president Gordon Keith Chalmers, who recruited poet and critic John Crowe Ransom as the magazine’s founding editor. Ransom served as editor until 1959, during which time the journal became a major venue for literary criticism and creative writing. During his 21-year tenure as editor, John Crowe Ransom made the magazine "perhaps the best known and most influential literary magazine in the English-speaking world during the 1940s and '50s".

In 1959, Robie Macauley succeeded Ransom as editor and expanded the journal’s publication of contemporary fiction and poetry alongside literary criticism, essays, and reviews.

The magazine ceased publication in 1969 due to financial challenges and was revived in 1979 under the leadership of Kenyon College President Phillip Hardin Jordan Jr. with Kenyon Professors of English Fred Turner, Ron Sharp, and William Klein as its editors. In 1989, The Kenyon Review had a circulation of 4,500.

In 1990, Marilyn Hacker, became the first full-time editor, followed in 1994 by David H. Lynn, who led the publication for over two decades and oversaw a period of financial stabilization and institutional expansion.

In 2020, poet Nicole Terez Dutton became editor of The Kenyon Review, continuing its legacy as a literary arts organization that integrates publishing, programming, and editorial mentorship.

== Publication ==
The magazine has published early and significant work by writers including Robert Penn Warren, Flannery O’Connor, Robert Lowell, Ford Madox Ford, Delmore Schwartz, and many others and continues to feature both emerging and established voices.

The Kenyon Review maintains a digital archive containing more than 9,000 works published since the journal’s founding in 1939. This esteemed and broad backlist includes work by writers such as T. S. Eliot, Nadine Gordimer, Randall Jarrell, Doris Lessing, Robert Lowell, V. S. Naipaul, Joyce Carol Oates, Charles Wright, V. S. Pritchett, Thomas Pynchon, Peter Taylor, Diane Seuss, Walter Mosley, Carl Phillips, Jenny Croft, Solmaz Sharif, Melissa Febos, ZZ Packer, Kevin Young, Rita Dove, Jenny Xie, Chigozie Obioma, Phillip B. Williams, Craig Santos Perez, Mecca Jamilah Sullivan, Stephanie Burt, T.C. Boyle, Mary Ruefle, Ilya Kaminsky, Honorée Fanonne Jeffers, Meghan O’Rourke, Reginald Dwayne Betts, Roger Reeves, Dina Nayeri, Victoria Chang, Arthur Sze, and Kimiko Hahn, among many others. The Kenyon Review published the first reviews in English of Tristes Tropiques and A Clockwork Orange.

The magazine’s short stories have won more O. Henry Awards than any other nonprofit journal. Recent winners include work by Evgenia Nekrasova and Kimberly Blaeser, both first published in The Kenyon Review. Many poems that first appeared in the quarterly have been reprinted in The Best American Poetry series, and the magazine is one of the most frequent sources for the series, where poems originally in The Kenyon Review have appeared in the editions for 1992, 1993, 1994, 1996, 1997, 1998, 2001, 2002, 2003, and 2006.

== Programs ==
=== Writing Workshops ===
Since 1995, The Kenyon Review has offered generative writing workshops in fiction, nonfiction, and poetry, serving thousands of emerging and established writers through residential and online programs.

The Kenyon Review Writers Workshops facilitates online and residential workshops. Residential workshops take place on Kenyon College campus. Recent faculty have included Dinty Moore, Grace Talusan, Rajiv Mohabir, ZZ Packer, Cleyvis Natera, Gabrielle Calvocolressi and Mitchell S. Jackson.

Scholarship support is available to those demonstrating financial need, including the Julia Alvarez Scholarship for a woman writer of color and the Nancy Zafris Scholarship for a fiction writer of exceptional talent, named in honor of the longtime workshop faculty member, and novelist Nancy Zafris.

Admission to the workshops is highly competitive and based primarily on the strength of the writing sample.

The Kenyon Review Young Writers Workshops welcome talented high school juniors and seniors from around the world to engage in multi-genre generative workshops. Offered in both residential and online formats, the highly competitive program brings together a diverse international cohort.

=== Associates Program ===
The Kenyon Review Associates Program provides Kenyon College students with valuable experience in literary editing, publishing, and programming. KR Associates work with editorial staff on manuscript evaluation and contribute to projects across editorial, digital, and public facing initiatives.

Participants attend seminars led by editorial staff, visiting writers, and publishing professionals, gaining exposure to editorial practices, outreach programming, and event planning.

The program functions as part of the organization’s editorial and educational programming, supporting early engagement with literary publishing and contributing to the cultural and artistic life of the Kenyon College community.

=== Kenyon Review Fellowships ===
The Kenyon Review Fellowships, established in 2012, are competitive two-year post-graduate residential fellowships that take place at Kenyon College.

Fellows receive health benefits, teach one course per semester in the Kenyon College English Department, and contribute to editorial and creative projects for The Kenyon Review. Participants also undertake a substantial writing project under faculty mentorship while working alongside renowned faculty in a dynamic community of thinkers.

Past fellows include Flannery O’Connor, W. S. Merwin, James Wright, and Robert Penn Warren in their formative years. More recent fellows include Natalie Shapero, Misha Rai, Jaquira Diaz, and Molly McCully Brown.

=== Developmental Editing Fellowship for Emerging Writers ===
This fellowship is designed to offer 1:1 mentorship over the course of four months to talented writers who demonstrate exceptional talent and promise working without community or institutional support.

Participants meet regularly to receive feedback on book-length projects in fiction, nonfiction, or poetry. Writers who have not yet published a full-length book in poetry, fiction, or nonfiction are eligible.

=== Reading Series ===
The Kenyon Review hosts an ongoing Reading Series that brings leading voices in contemporary literature to Kenyon College. Visiting authors participate in public readings, classroom visits, workshops, and conversations with students, contributing to the cultural life of the Kenyon College community.

Featured authors include recipients of major literary honors such as the Pulitzer Prize, Guggenheim Fellowships, and National Endowment for the Arts fellowships. Past readers include Iain Haley Pollock, Viet Thanh Nguyen, ZZ Packer, Richie Hofmann, and Jon Pineda, Kaveh Akbar, Felicia Zamora, Diana Khoi Nguyen, Evie Shockley, Rajiv Mohabir, Jaswinder Bolina, and Charles Bernstein.

=== Contests ===
The Kenyon Review administers several annual literary contests in fiction, nonfiction, and poetry, for adults and for high school students. These contests are designed to identify and support emerging voices and are open to writers who have not yet published a book in their respective genres.

The Fiction Contest established in 2008, is awarded annually to a writer who has not previously published a work of fiction. Cara Blue Adams won the inaugural contest, judged by novelist Alice Hoffman, while Nick Ripatrazone and Megan Mayhew Bergman were named runners-up., The Poetry Contest, Fiction Contest, and Nonfiction Contest are held annually, with submissions accepted electronically and judged by guest authors. Winning entries are published in The Kenyon Review, and winners receive a full scholarship to attend the Kenyon Review Writers Workshops. Past judges have included Diane Seuss, Roxane Gay, Leila Chatti, Kiese Laymon and Leslie Jamison.

The Patricia Grodd Poetry Prize for Young Writers, established in 2007, recognizes poetry by sophomores and juniors nationwide. The winning poem and runners-up are published in the journal, and the winner receives a full scholarship to attend the Kenyon Review Young Writers workshop.

== Kenyon Review Award for Literary Achievement ==
The Kenyon Review Award for Literary Achievement, established in 2002, is presented annually to extraordinary writers in recognition of their contributions to literature and the cultural impact of their work.

The first award was presented to novelist E .L. Doctorow (Kenyon College '52). Novelist and short-story writer Joyce Carol Oates received the award in 2003, while poet Seamus Heaney won it in 2004. The 2005 honorees were Umberto Eco, the novelist, and Roger Angell, the New Yorker fiction editor and baseball writer. In 2006 Ian McEwan received the award; Margaret Atwood followed in 2007, and Pulitzer Prize winning Independence Day author Richard Ford in 2008. In 2009 Louise Erdrich was honored, and in 2010 poet W.S. Merwin received the award. Historian, essayist and critic Simon Schama was the winner in 2011. Author and human rights advocate Elie Wiesel received the honor in 2012. In 2013 the poet Carl Phillips received the award, followed by novelist Ann Patchett in 2014. Roger Rosenblatt, author and playwright, won in 2015. The Kenyon Review honored author Hilary Mantel in 2016, and in 2017 acknowledged author Colm Toibin. In 2018, the award recognized American poet and essayist Rita Dove, a National Humanities and National Medal of Arts recipient, Pulitzer Prize winner and past U.S. poet laureate. In 2019, novelist, short story writer and USC Distinguished Professor of English T. C. Boyle received the award. While no award event took place in 2020, in 2021 the Board of Trustees honored its long serving editor, now editor emeritus, David Lynn as the nineteenth recipient of the Kenyon Review Award for Literary Achievement. Walter Mosley was given the award in 2023. Zadie Smith received it in 2024, and Viet Thanh Nguyen received it in 2025.

The award is presented at an annual gala in New York City, which serves as a fundraising event to fund scholarships for the Adult and Young Writers Workshops.

== Board of Trustees ==
The Kenyon Review is supported by a Board of Trustees composed of leaders in publishing, education, philanthropy, and the arts. Current trustees include Carly de Castro, Linda Kass, Andrew Tint, Bill Lowry, Jennifer Ash Rudick, Ben Goldberger, Laura Gross, Christopher Eaton, Patricia Dunn, Mark Hollingsworth, Larae Schraeder, Nikki Selden, Elizabeth Shreve, David Hale Smith, and Christopher Toft. Ex Officio members include Aileen Hefferren, Chair of the Kenyon College Board of Trustees; Julie Kornfeld, President of Kenyon College; and Nicole Terez Dutton, Editor of The Kenyon Review.

Trustees Emeriti include Marci Barr Abbot, John Adams, David F. Banks, James H. Brandi, Mary Elizabeth Bunzel, Jackie Dryfoos, Randy Fertel, Peter Flaherty, Jean Graham, Alva G. Greenberg, Robert E. Hallinan, Paul B. Healy, Pamela Hoehn-Saric, Grace Keefe Huebscher, Daniel Kramer, James C. Niederman, Betty B. Robbins, Abby Wender, Peter White, Matthew Winkler, and Don Zacharia.

== See also ==
- List of literary magazines
- Kenyon College
