= Stephen Berg =

American poet, editor, translator, and educator

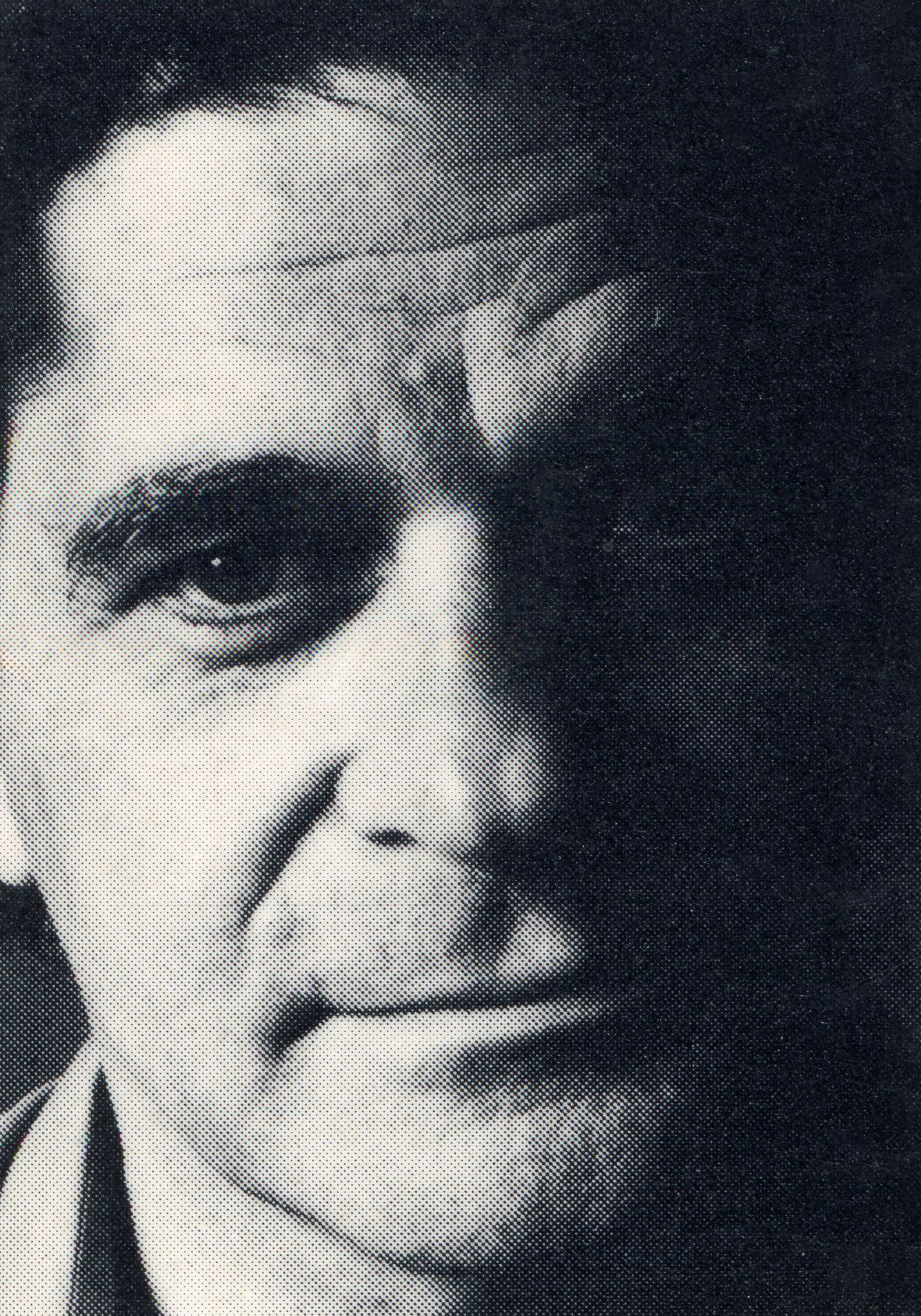
- Stephen Berg
- Born: August 2, 1934; Philadelphia, Pennsylvania, U.S.
- Died: June 12, 2014 (aged 79); Philadelphia, Pennsylvania, U.S.
- Citizenship: American
- Education: University of Iowa (BA)
- Occupations: Poet, editor, translator

Stephen Walter Berg (August 2, 1934 – June 12, 2014) was an American poet, editor, translator, and educator. He wrote over thirty books of poetry, prose, translations, and versions, and edited eight poetry anthologies. In 1972, he founded The American Poetry Review, a bimonthly poetry magazine based in Philadelphia, Pennsylvania, where he served as editor until his death.

== Early life and education ==
Stephen Walter Berg was born on August 2, 1934, in Philadelphia and raised in both Philadelphia and East Orange, New Jersey. His parents, Sidney Berg (1909–1973), a printing firm executive and graduate of the Wharton School at the University of Pennsylvania, and Hilda Wachansky (1909–1990), a custom jeweler, were of Hungarian and Russian Jewish descent. Berg attended public schools in West Philadelphia and East Orange and began writing poetry in his early teens.

He studied at the University of Pennsylvania, Boston University, where he worked with Robert Lowell, the Indiana University School of Letters, and the University of Iowa, where he earned a bachelor's degree in 1959. Berg met Millie Lane (born 1936) of Clemson, South Carolina at the University of Iowa; they were married in 1959 and had two daughters. Lane is a retired professor of early childhood education and children's literature at the Community College of Philadelphia.

== Career ==
After graduating from the University of Iowa, Berg received a Rockefeller Foundation Fellowship in Poetry and Translation at the Centro Mexicano de Escritores in Mexico City, where he lived with his wife from 1959 to 1961.

In 1967, Berg began teaching poetry and creative writing at the University of the Arts in Philadelphia, where he served as a professor of humanities for over forty years. He also taught at Temple University, Princeton University, Loyola University Maryland, and Haverford College. Berg founded The American Poetry Review in Philadelphia in 1972 and continued as editor until his death in 2014. He published thirty-eight books of poetry and anthologies; and his work was published in several magazines and anthologies including: The New Yorker, Poetry, The Paris Review, Hudson Review, The Denver Quarterly, A Celebration for Stanley Kunitz on His 80th Birthday, Poetry London, Antaeus, Arion: A Journal of Humanities and the Classics, Beneath a Single Moon: Buddhism in Contemporary American Poetry, The New Breadloaf Anthology of Contemporary American Poetry, Poets of the New Century: An Anthology, and others.

Berg and Lane lived in center city Philadelphia for over fifty years and were integral to a community of poets, painters, architects, designers, educators, gallerists, and craftspeople. Berg was an art collector and a devotee of the Japanese potter Toshiko Takaezu.

In 1991, Berg collaborated with painter Thomas Chimes on Sleeping Woman, a public art project commissioned by the Association for Public Art. The work is a 1,125-foot-long line of poetry (the poem Sleeping Woman) painted on a retaining wall along the Schuylkill River on Kelly Drive in Philadelphia, between the Frederic Remington Cowboy sculpture and the Carl Milles Playing Angels sculptures. He founded Zig Zag Press Publishing in 2013, through which he released Steam Rising from a Full Bowl of Rice.

== Death ==
Stephen Berg died on June 12, 2014, in Philadelphia from complications related to chronic lymphocytic leukemia. He was 79 years old. He was survived by his wife, Millie Lane Berg, and three daughters.

== Awards and honors ==
Berg received fellowships and awards from the Guggenheim Foundation, the National Endowment for the Arts, the Ford Foundation, the Dietrich Foundation, and the Pew Charitable Trusts. From 1959 to 1961, he held a Rockefeller Foundation Fellowship in Poetry and Translation. He also received a PEN translation grant and the Frank O’Hara Prize.

== Critical reception ==
In a posthumous essay on Berg’s poetry for The American Poetry Review, Edward Hirsch wrote, "Berg was a fragmented post-confessional, a spiritual seeker, a poetic magpie, an antic skeptic, an agnostic Jew who kept looking for justice, for wisdom, for God, who disappointed him… He read and wrote as if his life depended on it." C.K. Williams described Berg’s New and Selected Poems as "passionate and audacious, eloquent and zany... maintaining a startling forthrightness of vision and a remarkable elegance of tone.". Hayden Carruth wrote, “From Joyce to Morrison, the great accomplishment of the twentieth century was to establish what a Writer is. Not many are left, but Berg is squarely among them.” Gerald Stern said of his poems, "These are beautiful poems, great passion, vision. Above all, humanity."

== Selected publications ==
=== Poetry and prose collections ===
- Poems (1954)
- Bearing Weapons (1963)
- The Queen’s Triangle, a romance, William Kulik, illustrator (1970)
- The Daughters (1971)
- Grief (1975)
- With Akhmatova at the Black Gates (1981)
- In It (1986)
- Homage to the Afterlife (1991)
- New & Selected Poems (1992)
- Oblivion (1995)
- Shaving (1998)
- Halo (2000)
- Porno Diva Numero Uno: An Anonymous Confession (2000)
- Footnotes to an Unfinished Poem (2001)
- X = (2002)
- The Elegy on Hats (2005)
- The Poetry Does Not Matter (2010)
- 58 Poems (2013)
- Here (2014)

=== Translations and versions ===
- Sunstone by Octavio Paz (1958)
- Nothing in the Word: Versions of Aztec Poetry (1972)
- Oedipus the King (1988), with Diskin Clay; performed at the Stratford Festival, Ontario, Canada, 2015
- Sea Ice: Versions of Eskimo Songs (1988)
- Ikkyu: Crow with No Mouth: 15th Century Zen Master (1989)
- Clouded Sky, poems by Miklos Radnoti (2003), with Steven Polgar and S.J. Marks
- The Steel Cricket: Versions 1958–1997 (1997)
- Rimbaud: Versions and Inventions (2005)
- Cuckoo’s Blood: Versions of Zen Masters (2008)
- Steam Rising from a Full Bowl of Rice: Zen Master Dogen Versions (2013)
- Crazy Cloud Ikkyu: Versions and Inventions (2014)

=== Edited anthologies ===
- Naked Poetry: Recent American Poetry in Open Forms (1969), with Robert Mezey
- The New Naked Poetry (1976), with Robert Mezey
- Between People (1970), with S.J. Marks and Michael Pilz
- About Women (1971), with S.J. Marks
- In Praise of What Persists (1983)
- Singular Voices: American Poetry Today (1985)
- The Body Electric: The Best Poetry from The American Poetry Review (2000), with David Bonanno and Arthur Vogelsang
- My Business is Circumference: Poets on Influence and Mastery (2001)
