= The Best American Essays =

Yearly anthology of the year's best essays

The Best American Essays is a yearly anthology of magazine articles published in the United States. It was started in 1986 and is now part of The Best American Series published by HarperCollins. Articles are chosen using the same procedure with other titles in the Best American series; the series editor chooses about 100 article candidates, from which the guest editor picks 25 or so for publication; the remaining runner-up articles listed in the appendix. The series was edited by Robert Atwan from its inception in 1986 through 2023. Kim Dana Kupperman is the new series editor starting in 2024. Joyce Carol Oates assisted in the editing process until 2000 with the publication of The Best American Essays of the Century.

== Guest editors ==
- 1986: Elizabeth Hardwick
- 1987: Gay Talese
- 1988: Annie Dillard
- 1989: Geoffrey Wolff
- 1990: Justin Kaplan
- 1991: Joyce Carol Oates
- 1992: Susan Sontag
- 1993: Joseph Epstein
- 1994: Tracy Kidder
- 1995: Jamaica Kincaid
- 1996: Geoffrey C. Ward
- 1997: Ian Frazier
- 1998: Cynthia Ozick
- 1999: Edward Hoagland
- 2000: Alan Lightman
- 2001: Kathleen Norris
- 2002: Stephen Jay Gould
- 2003: Anne Fadiman
- 2004: Louis Menand
- 2005: Susan Orlean
- 2006: Lauren Slater
- 2007: David Foster Wallace
- 2008: Adam Gopnik
- 2009: Mary Oliver
- 2010: Christopher Hitchens
- 2011: Edwidge Danticat
- 2012: David Brooks
- 2013: Cheryl Strayed
- 2014: John Jeremiah Sullivan
- 2015: Ariel Levy
- 2016: Jonathan Franzen
- 2017: Leslie Jamison
- 2018: Hilton Als
- 2019: Rebecca Solnit
- 2020: André Aciman
- 2021: Kathryn Schulz
- 2022: Alexander Chee
- 2023: Vivian Gornick
- 2024: Wesley Morris
- 2025: Jia Tolentino
- 2026: M. Gessen

== Contributing publications ==
- The Alaska Quarterly Review
- The Baffler
- The Boston Review
- BuzzFeed
- Electric Literature
- The Florida Review
- Granta
- Harper's Magazine
- The Kenyon Review
- Lapham's Quarterly
- n+1
- The New York Times Magazine
- North American Review
- Oxford American
- The Threepenny Review
- Tin House
- Transition Magazine
- Virginia Quarterly Review
