= James Tate (writer) =

American poet

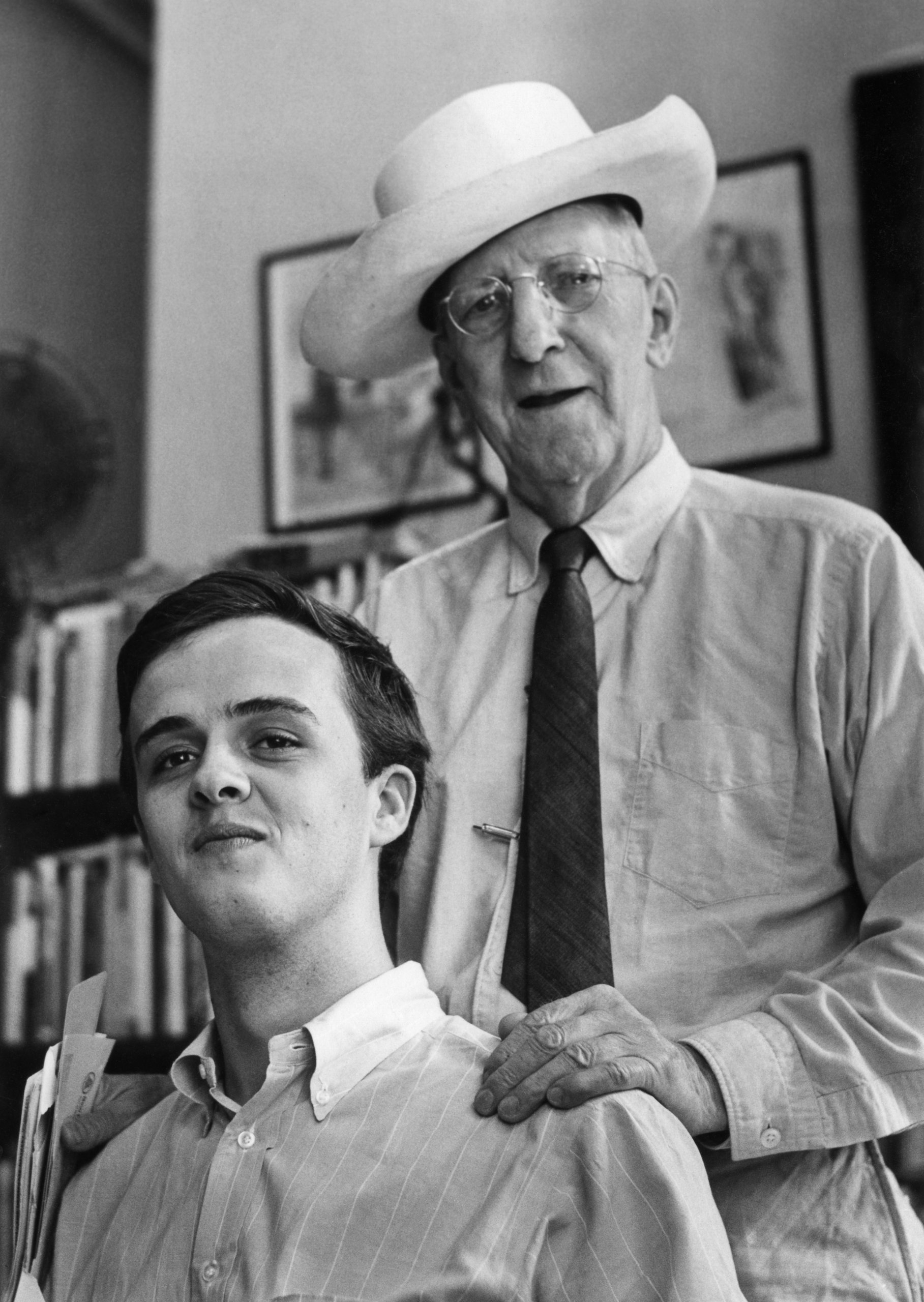
- Tate (left) at the Grolier Poetry Book Shop in 1965 with the owner, Gordon Cairnie
- Born: James Vincent Tate; December 8, 1943; Kansas City, Missouri, US
- Died: July 8, 2015 (aged 71); Amherst, Massachusetts, US
- Education: Pittsburg State University (BA); University of Iowa (MFA)
- Spouse: Dara Wier
- Writing career
- Notable work: Worshipful Company of Fletchers
- Notable awards: Pulitzer Prize; 1992; National Book Award; 1994
- Website: jamestate.net

James Vincent Tate (December 8, 1943 – July 8, 2015) was an American poet. His work earned him the Pulitzer Prize and the National Book Award. He was a professor of English at the University of Massachusetts Amherst and a member of the American Academy of Arts and Letters.

== Biography ==
Tate was born in Kansas City, Missouri, where he lived with his mother and his grandparents in his grandparents' house. His father, a pilot in World War II, had died in combat on April 11, 1944, before Tate was a year old. Tate and his mother moved out after seven years when she remarried. The eventual poet said he belonged to a gang in high school and had little interest in literature. He planned on being a gas station attendant as his uncle had been, but finding that his friends to his surprise were going to college, he applied to Kansas State College of Pittsburg (now Pittsburg State University) in 1961.

Tate wrote his first poem a few months into college with no external motivation; he observed that poetry "became a private place that I was hugely drawn to, where I could let my daydreams—and my pain—come in completely disguised. I knew from the moment I started writing that I never wanted to be writing about my life." In college he read Wallace Stevens and William Carlos Williams and was "in heaven". He received his B.A. in 1965, going on to earn his M.F.A. from the University of Iowa's famed Writer's Workshop. During this period he was finally exposed to fellow poets and he became interested in surrealism, reading Max Jacob, Robert Desnos, and André Breton; for Benjamin Péret he expressed particular affection. Of poets writing in Spanish, César Vallejo "destroyed" him but he was not so taken by the lyricism or romanticism of Pablo Neruda or Federico García Lorca.

He was married to Dara Wier. Tate died on July 8, 2015, at the age of 71.

== Career ==
Tate taught creative writing at the University of California, Berkeley, Columbia University, and at the University of Massachusetts Amherst, where he worked from 1971 until his death in 2015. He was a member of the poetry faculty at the MFA Program for Poets & Writers, along with Dara Wier and Peter Gizzi.

Dudley Fitts selected Tate's first book of poems, The Lost Pilot (1967), for the Yale Series of Younger Poets while Tate was still a student at the Writers' Workshop; Fitts praised Tate's writing for its "natural grace." Tate's first volume of poetry, Cages, was published by Shepherd's Press, Iowa City, 1966.

Tate won the 1992 Pulitzer Prize and the Poetry Society of America's William Carlos Williams Award in 1991 for his Selected Poems. In 1994, he won the National Book Award for his poetry collection Worshipful Company of Fletchers.

Tate's writing style is often described as surrealistic, comic and absurdist. His work has captivated other poets as diverse as John Ashbery and Dana Gioia. Regarding his own work, Tate said, "My characters usually are—or, I’d say most often, I don’t want to generalize too much—but most often they’re in trouble, and they’re trying to find some kind of life." This view is supported by the poet Tony Hoagland's observation that "his work of late has been in prose poems, in which his picaresque speaker or characters are spinning through life, inquisitive and clueless as Candide, trying to identify and get with the fiction of whatever world they are in."

In addition to many books of poetry, he published two books of prose, Dreams of a Robot Dancing Bee (2001) and The Route as Briefed (1999).

Some of Tate's additional awards included a National Institute of Arts and Letters Award, the Wallace Stevens Award, and fellowships from the Guggenheim Foundation and the National Endowment for the Arts. He was also a Chancellor of the Academy of American Poets.

== Published works ==
Full-length poetry collections

- The Lost Pilot (Yale University Press, 1967)
- The Oblivion Ha-Ha (Little, Brown & Co., 1970)
- Hints to Pilgrims (Halty Ferguson, 1971)
- Absences: New Poems (Little, Brown & Co., 1972)
- Viper Jazz (Wesleyan University Press, 1976)
- Riven Doggeries (Ecco Press, 1979)
- Constant Defender (Ecco Press, 1983)
- Reckoner (Wesleyan University Press, 1986)
- Distance from Loved Ones (Wesleyan University Press, 1990)
- Selected Poems (Wesleyan University Press, 1991) — winner of the Pulitzer Prize and the William Carlos Williams Award
- Worshipful Company of Fletchers: Poems (Ecco Press, 1994) — winner of the National Book Award
- Shroud of the Gnome (Ecco Press, 1997)
- Memoir of the Hawk (Ecco Press, 2002)
- Return to the City of White Donkeys (Ecco Press, 2004)
- The Ghost Soldiers (Ecco Press, 2008)
- The Eternal Ones of the Dream: Selected Poems 1990–2010 (Ecco Press, 2012)
- Dome of the Hidden Pavilion (Ecco Press, 2015)
- The Government Lake: Last Poems (Ecco Press, 2019)
- Hell I Love Everybody: The Essential James Tate (Ecco Press, 2023)

Chapbooks

- Cages (Shepherds Press, 1966)
- Notes of Woe (Stone Wall Press, 1968)
- The Torches (Unicorn Press, 1968)
- Row with your Hair (Kayak Press, 1969)
- Shepherds of the Mist (Black Sparrow Press, 1969)
- Wrong Songs (H. Ferguson, 1970)
- Amnesia People (Little Balkans Press, 1970)
- Apology for Eating Geoffrey Movius’ Hyacinth (Unicorn Press, 1972)
- Land of Little Sticks (Metacom Press, 1981)
- Just Shades (Parallel Editions, 1985, illustrated by John Alcorn)
- Bewitched: 26 poems (Embers Handpress, Wales, illustration by Laurie Smith.)
- Police Story (Rain Taxi, 1999)
- Lost River (Sarabande Books, 2003)
- The Zoo Club (Rain Taxi, 2011)

Prose

- Hottentot Ossuary (Temple Bar Bookshop, 1974)
- The Route as Briefed (University of Michigan Press, 1999)
- Dreams of a Robot Dancing Bee: 44 Stories (Verse Press, 2002)

Collaborations

- Are You Ready, Mary Baker Eddy??? (Cloud Marauder Press, 1970, poems co-written with Bill Knott)
- Lucky Darryl (Release Press, 1977, a novel co-written with Bill Knott)

In anthologies

Tate's work has been included in The Best American Poetry series numerous times, including in 1988, 1990, 1991, 1993, 1994, 1997, 1998, 2001, 2003, 2004, 2005, 2006, 2008, and 2010; his work was also in The Norton Anthology of Modern and Contemporary Poetry.

== Honors and awards ==
In 2004, Tate was elected to the American Academy of Arts and Letters.

Other recognition has included:

- 1995 Wallace Stevens Award
- Pulitzer Prize for Poetry
- 1991 William Carlos Williams Award
- National Institute of Arts and Letters Award
- Guggenheim Fellowship
- National Endowment for the Arts Literature Fellowship in Poetry
- National Book Award for Poetry
- Yale Series of Younger Poets
