= The Iowa Review =

American literary magazine

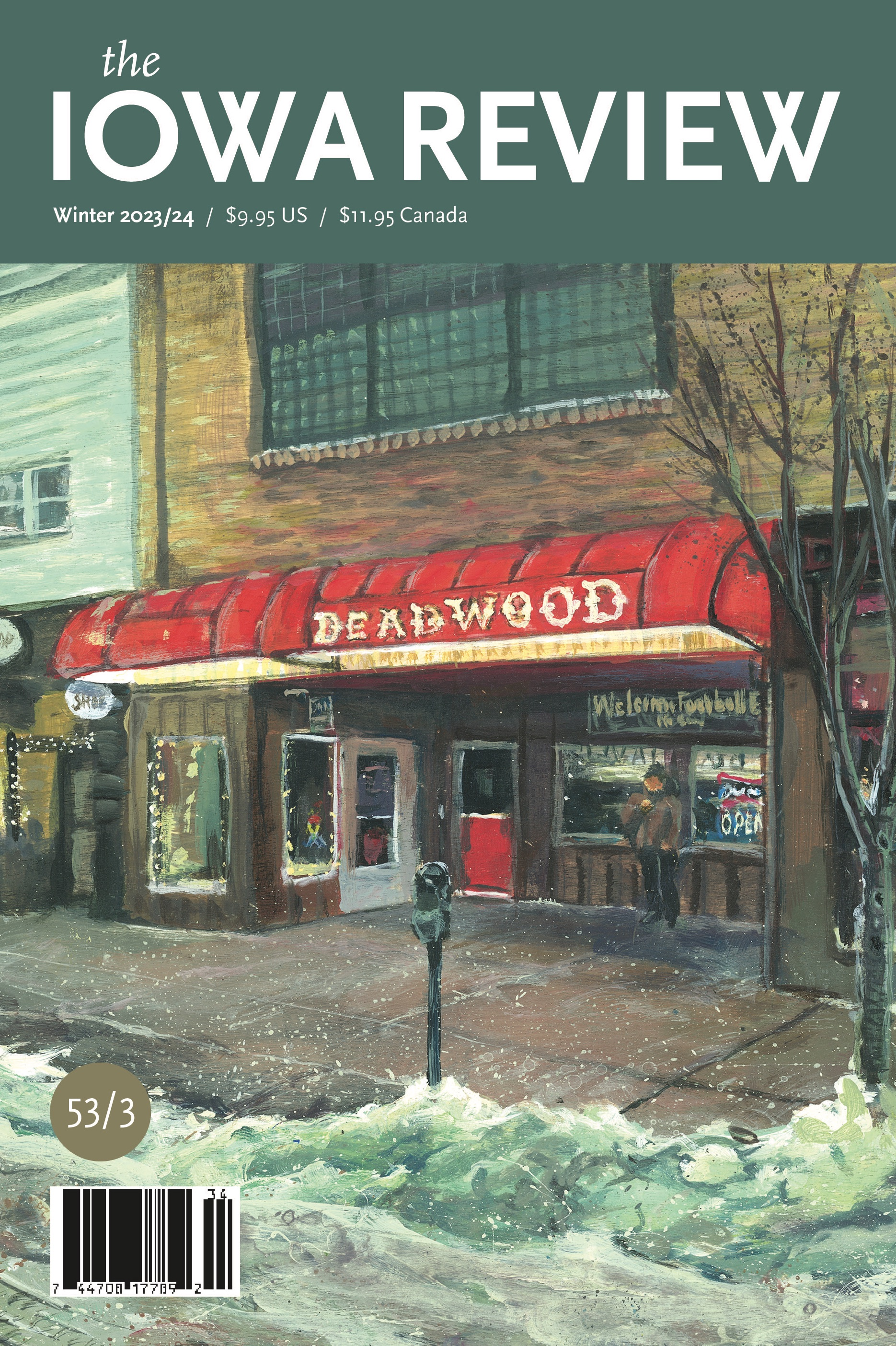
- Cover of The Iowa Review 53/3, featuring Deadwood by Carlos Maldonado
- Discipline: Literary journal
- Language: English
- Edited by: Lynne Nugent

Publication details
- History: 1970-present
- Publisher: University of Iowa (United States)
- Frequency: Triannual

Standard abbreviations
- ISO 4: Iowa Rev.

Indexing
- ISSN: 0021-065X
- JSTOR: 0021065X
- OCLC no.: 1234380

Links
- Journal homepage

The Iowa Review is an American literary magazine published by the University of Iowa that features fiction, poetry, nonfiction, and literary criticism. Founded in 1970, the magazine has showcased work by both emerging and established writers, and has tri-annual issues, editorial contests, and connections to the university's writing programs.

== History and profile ==
Founded in 1970, Iowa Review is issued three times a year, during the months of April, August, and December. Originally, it was released on a quarterly basis. This frequency of publication lasted until its fourteenth year. It is published at The University of Iowa in Iowa City. According to former editor David Hamilton, The Iowa Review has a circulation of about 3,000, of which 1,000-1,500 are distributed to major bookstore chains.

The reading period for unsolicited submissions occurs between August and October in fiction and poetry and August and November in nonfiction, whereas contest submissions for the Iowa Review Awards are read in January.

In addition to space dedicated in the December issue to the Iowa Review Awards winners, the magazine has recently featured work from The University of Iowa's biannual NonfictioNow conference and from writers in The University of Iowa's International Writing Program.

Several of these pieces are selected each year for awards and anthologies: recent selections include Susan Perabo's short story "Shelter" (39.1) for The Pushcart Prize XXXV: Best of the Small Presses, 2011 edition, Eula Biss's essay "Time and Distance Overcome" (38.1) and Carolyne Wright's poem "This dream the world is having about itself..." (38.2) for The Pushcart Prize XXXIV: Best of the Small Presses, 2010 edition; Patricia Hampl's essay "The Dark Art of Description" (38.1), selected by Mary Oliver for The Best American Essays 2009; and Stephen Dunn's "Where He Found Himself" (36.2), in Best American Poetry 2007.

== Iowa Review Awards ==
Each year, beginning with 2003 (33.3), the magazine presents the Iowa Review Award to contest winners in fiction, poetry, and literary nonfiction. Outside judges name the winners, who each receive $1,500 and are published, along with some finalists, in the magazine's December issue. Recent winners include Rochelle Goldstein Bay (Nonfiction, 2023), Eliza Gilbert (Poetry, 2023), and Gracie Newman (Fiction, 2023).

== See also ==
- List of literary magazines
