= Susan Mitchell =

American poet, essayist and translator (born 1944)

Susan Mitchell (born 1944) is an American poet, essayist and translator who wrote the poetry collections Rapture and Erotikon. She is a recipient of the Lannan Literary Award for Poetry.

== Life ==
Mitchell grew up in New York City, New York and now lives in Boca Raton, Florida. She has a B.A. in English literature from Wellesley College, an M.A. from Georgetown University, and was a PhD student at Columbia University. She has taught at Middlebury College and Northeastern Illinois University, and currently holds the Mary Blossom Lee Endowed Chair in Creative Writing at Florida Atlantic University.

She has published poems in literary journals and magazines including The New Yorker, The Atlantic Monthly, The American Poetry Review, The New Republic, Ploughshares, and The Paris Review. Her poems have also been included in five volumes of The Best American Poetry and two Pushcart Prize volumes.

== Awards ==
She has been recognized for her work by notable organizations such as the National Endowment for the Arts, the Guggenheim Foundation, and the Lannan Foundation. Her collection, Rapture, won the Kingsley Tufts Poetry Award and was a National Book Award finalist.

== Published works ==
- Erotikon (HarperCollins, 2001)
- Rapture (HarperPerennial, 1992)
- The Water Inside the Water (Wesleyan University Press, 1983)

== Honors and awards ==
- 1993 Kingsley Tufts Poetry Award
- 1992 Lannan Literary Award for Poetry
- 1982 NEA Literature Fellowship in Poetry
- 1992 Guggenheim Fellowship
