= The Threepenny Review =

American literary magazine

- Editor: Wendy Lesser
- Categories: Literary
- Frequency: 4 per year
- Total circulation: 10000
- Founded: 1980
- Country: United States
- Based in: Berkeley, California
- Language: English
- Website: www.threepennyreview.com
- ISSN: 0275-1410

The Threepenny Review is an American literary magazine founded in 1980. It is published in Berkeley, California, by founding editor Wendy Lesser. Maintaining a quarterly schedule (March, June, September, December), it offers fiction, memoirs, poetry, essays and criticism to a readership of 10,000. Without the support of patrons or a university, the publication has an annual budget of $200,000.

== History ==
San Francisco's Fraenkel Gallery was the source for this 1939 Frank Navara photo, Coffee Pot, Ohio, featured on the cover of The Threepenny Review 83 (Fall 2000).

The magazine was launched in 1980 after Lesser (then 27 years old with no editing experience) was a guest editor of Ron Nowicki's San Francisco Review of Books. She found the experience so rewarding that she decided to create her own publication, and the first issue of The Threepenny Review appeared three months later. She chose the title for its "obvious Brechtian overtones". "The Threepenny Opera" is the title of one of Brecht's most famous works.

It sometimes features an essay symposium, as described by critic Deborah Mead in reviewing issue 104 (Winter 2006):

What sets The Threepenny Review apart from other little magazines is its cultural essays. A frequent feature of this journal is the symposium, a series of essays on a single topic. The essayists in this issue focus on plot, many writing to defend plot from its current disfavor, although Geoff Dyer chimes in to denigrate plot some more. Other essays tackle unexpected topics—music and pain, Dylan’s worst song, the placebo effect—with insight and lucidity.

== Contributors ==
Authors published in the magazine include Jacob M. Appel, André Aciman, John Berger, Wendell Berry, Frank Bidart, Eavan Boland, Roberto Bolaño, Jane Bowles, Robert Olen Butler, Anne Carson, T. J. Clark, Henri Cole, Lucille Lang Day, W. S. Di Piero, Mark Doty, Margaret Drabble, Geoff Dyer, Deborah Eisenberg, Paula Fox, Dagoberto Gilb, Sean Gill, Louise Glück, Charlie Haas, Donald Hall, Seamus Heaney, Tony Hoagland, Louis B. Jones, A. L. Kennedy, August Kleinzahler, Gideon Lewis-Kraus, Philip Levine, Phillip Lopate, David Mamet, Greil Marcus, Paul Muldoon, Sigrid Nunez, Kenzaburō Ōe, Cynthia Ozick, Dale Peck, Adam Phillips, Robert Pinsky, Jim Powell (poet), Atsuro Riley, Kay Ryan, Oliver Sacks, Lucy Sante, Mark Sarvas, Elizabeth Tallent, Amy Tan, James Tate, Tony Tulathimutte, Gore Vidal, Lawrence Weschler, Rachel Wetzsteon, Frederick Wiseman, Dean Young, and Adam Zagajewski.

The Threepenny Review has published more literary work by Javier Marías than any other American magazine. Cover art, often selected from works at the San Francisco Museum of Modern Art, has run the gamut from Edward Hopper to W. Eugene Smith.

== Awards ==
Pieces from the magazine have been selected for inclusion in the Best American Poetry, Best American Travel Writing, Best American Essays, and The O. Henry Prize Stories anthologies.

On June 16, 2006, Lesser created The Lesser Blog, an online spin-off for her own writing. A selection of various contributions to The Threepenny Review can also be read at the magazine's website.

== See also ==
- List of literary magazines
