= Amy Gerstler =

American poet

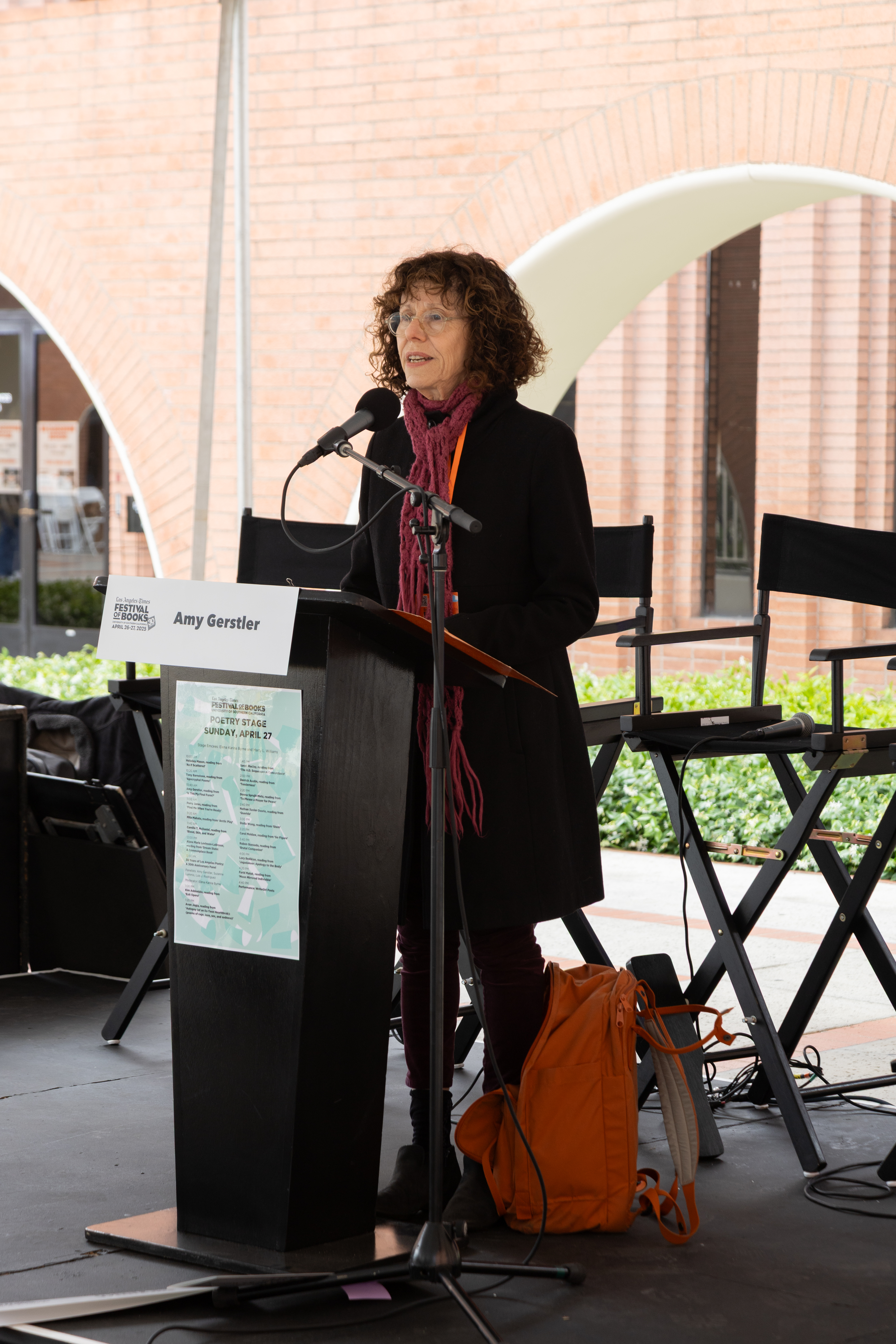
Gerstler reading in 2025

Amy Gerstler (born 1956) is an American poet living in Los Angeles, California. She has won a Guggenheim Fellowship as well as the National Book Critics Circle Award.

== Biography ==
Amy Gerstler was born in 1956. She is a graduate of Pitzer College and holds an M.F.A. from Bennington College. Gerstler is now a professor in the MFA writing program at the University of California, Irvine. Previously, she taught in the Bennington Writing Seminars program, at Art Center College of Design in Pasadena, California and the University of Southern California's Master of Professional Writing Program.

She was editor of the 2010 edition of the anthology Best American Poetry. She is also the author of art reviews, book reviews, fiction, and occasional journalistic essays. She has collaborated with visual artists, including Alexis Smith, and her writing has been published in numerous exhibition catalogs.

Her books of poetry include Medicine (finalist for the Phi Beta Kappa Poetry Award) and Bitter Angel (1990) (winner of the 1990 National Book Critics Circle Award).

Described by the Los Angeles Times as "one of the best poets in the nation," her 2009 book, Dearest Creature, was named one of the notable books of the year by the New York Times.

Scattered at Sea, her 2015 collection, was longlisted for the National Book Award.

She is married to artist and author Benjamin Weissman.

== Works ==
- Index of Women New York: Penguin Books, 2021. ISBN 9780143136217
- Scattered at Sea, New York : Penguin Books, 2015. ISBN 9780143126898 014312689X, OCLC 892458622
- Dearest Creature, New York : Penguin Books, 2009. ISBN 9780143116356, OCLC 729917726
- Ghost Girl New York : Penguin Books, 2004. ISBN 9780142000649, OCLC 636833399
- Medicine New York : Penguin, 2000. ISBN 9780140589245, OCLC 42753014
- Crown of Weeds New York : Penguin Books, 1997. ISBN 9780140587784, OCLC 35151217
- Nerve Storm New York : Penguin Books, 1993. ISBN 9781101173978, OCLC 883325258
- Bitter Angel Pittsburgh, Pa. Carnegie Mellon University Press 1997. ISBN 9780887482311, OCLC 245999325
- The True Bride Santa Monica : Lapis Press, 1986. ISBN 9780932499035, OCLC 15095599
- White marriage; & Recovery, Los Angeles, Calif. : Illuminati, 1984. ISBN 9780898071054, OCLC 10868537
