= The Best American Poetry =

Series of annual anthologies

The Best American Poetry series consists of annual poetry anthologies, each containing seventy-five poems. The 2025 edition announced that it would be the final volume in the series.

== Background ==
The series, begun by poet and editor David Lehman in 1988, has a different guest editor every year. Lehman, still the general editor of the series, each year contributes a foreword focusing on the state of contemporary poetry, and each year the edition's guest editor also contributes an introduction. The book titles in the series always follow the format of the first, changing only the year: for instance, The Best American Poetry 1988.

According to the Academy of American Poets website, "Best American Poetry remains one of the most popular and best-selling poetry books published each year and the series continues to provide a bird's-eye view of the breadth of American poetry."

A compendium for the first decade of the series has also been published, The Best of the Best American Poetry 1988–1997, guest-edited by literary critic Harold Bloom, who selected what he regarded as the seventy-five best poems from the previous ten anthologies. This was followed in 2013 by The Best of the Best American Poetry: 25th Anniversary Edition (2013), in which guest editor Robert Pinsky selected 100 poems from the series' history.

A collection of Lehman's forewords was published together as a look at contemporary poetry called The State of the Art: A Chronicle of American Poetry, 1988–2014.

== Guest editors ==
The guest editors of the series, by year:

- 2025: Terence Winch
- 2024: Mary Jo Salter
- 2023: Elaine Equi
- 2022: Matthew Zapruder
- 2021: Tracy K. Smith *
- 2020: Paisley Rekdal
- 2019: Major Jackson
- 2018: Dana Gioia
- 2017: Natasha Trethewey *
- 2016: Edward Hirsch
- 2015: Sherman Alexie
- 2014: Terrance Hayes
- The Best of the Best American Poetry 25th Anniversary: Robert Pinsky *
- 2013: Denise Duhamel
- 2012: Mark Doty
- 2011: Kevin Young
- 2010: Amy Gerstler
- 2009: David Wagoner
- 2008: Charles Wright *
- 2007: Heather McHugh
- 2006: Billy Collins *
- 2005: Paul Muldoon
- 2004: Lyn Hejinian
- 2003: Yusef Komunyakaa
- 2002: Robert Creeley
- 2001: Robert Hass *
- 2000: Rita Dove *
- 1999: Robert Bly
- 1998: John Hollander
- The Best of the Best American Poetry 1988–1997: Harold Bloom
- 1997: James Tate
- 1996: Adrienne Rich
- 1995: Richard Howard
- 1994: A. R. Ammons
- 1993: Louise Glück *
- 1992: Charles Simic *
- 1991: Mark Strand *
- 1990: Jorie Graham
- 1989: Donald Hall *
- 1988: John Ashbery

* editors who have also been U.S. poets laureate

== Rules and process ==
In his 1988 foreword to the first edition of the series, Lehman laid out the following rules:

- Lehman would select a poet each year to serve as guest editor;
- Each year's guest editor would make the final selection of poems;
- Each year's anthology would have poems from the previous calendar year (the 1988 anthology, for instance, would include only poems published in 1987);
- There would be fifty to seventy-five poems in each annual anthology (in fact, there have always been 75 poems);
- The guest editor could select as many as three poems by an individual poet;
- Poets would be asked to submit brief biographical information and, at their option, given the opportunity to write a bit about the poem chosen ("its form or its occasion or the method of composition or any other feature worth remarking on");
- The poems could come from magazines, including large-circulation periodicals and small presses, and in rare instances from books by individual poets;
- For poems that had first appeared more than a year in the past but which had been reprinted in a magazine during the previous calendar year, Lehman decided to have no rule ("To such questions, the anthologist's ever-ready response is: you just play it by ear");
- Foreign poets residing in the United States, "especially in cases where the poet has come to seem a vital presence in a particular American community", would be eligible to appear, and so John Ash, Seamus Heaney, and Derek Walcott all made it into the 1988 edition.

Lehman also wrote that he had set some tasks for himself as series editor:

- Maintain continuity from year to year;
- Enforce "such rules as there are";
- Assist the guest editor, in particular by helping find poetry for the guest editor to look over;
- Pick the guest editor.

John Ashbery selected a poem by Lehman for inclusion in the inaugural volume of The Best American Poetry. In his introduction to the 1989 volume, Donald Hall noted: "The series editor declined to be included." The Lehman's own poems have appeared in subsequent volumes. Guest editors have occasionally included their own poems, although some have, despite Lehman’s encouragement, declined to do so.

In Lehman's foreword to the 1992 book, he noted that translations are ineligible.

== Critical reception of the series ==
According to the Academy of American Poets website, "[t]he Best American Poetry series has become one of the mainstays of the poetry publication world". The Academy website called the introductions to the collection by the guest editors, as well as Lehman's "state-of-poetry" forewords, "indespensible". As a whole, the anthologies "seem to capture the zeitgeist of the current attitudes in American poetry."

However, the Academy article also noted that the series and its editors are "often criticized for their selections and assessments (common complaints include the exclusion of experimental poets, lack of diversity, and allegiance to poetry's "old guard") [...]"

In a 2025 retrospective, Elisa Gabbert, a poetry columnist for The New York Times, wrote that "the ratio of poems I find appealing to not is about the same as it would be in a good journal". She also wrote that she previously regarded the poems as "models for being a poet" but later saw them as "models for being, full stop."
