= A. R. Ammons =

American poet (1926–2001)

- Ammons in 1998
- Born: February 18, 1926 near Whiteville, North Carolina
- Died: February 25, 2001 (aged 75); Ithaca, New York
- Education: Wake Forest University; University of California, Berkeley
- Occupations: Poet; columnist; essayist

Archibald Randolph Ammons (February 18, 1926 – February 25, 2001) was an American poet and professor of English at Cornell University. Ammons published nearly thirty collections of poems in his lifetime. Revered for his impact on American romantic poetry, Ammons received several major awards for his work, including two National Book Awards for Poetry, one in 1973 for Collected Poems and another in 1993 for Garbage.

== Poetic themes ==
Literary critics have associated Ammons with earlier poets of the American romantic tradition, such as Ralph Waldo Emerson and Walt Whitman. In line with these romantic roots, Ammons's poetry explores the individual soul through its connection to quotidian life and the natural world. Nevertheless, Ammons exhibits several qualities that distinguish him from his peers and predecessors. With a deep knowledge of natural phenomena, Ammons is noted for wielding a wide lexicon of scientific terms. He is also regarded for his witty—and sometimes coarse—humor, which balances out the gravity of his transcendentalist themes.

== Life ==
Ammons grew up on a tobacco farm near Whiteville, North Carolina, in the southeastern part of the state. He served as a sonar operator in the U.S. Navy during World War II, stationed on board the USS Gunason, a destroyer escort. After the war, Ammons attended Wake Forest University, majoring in biology. Graduating in 1949, he served as a principal and teacher at Hattaras Elementary School later that year and also married Phyllis Plumbo. He received an M.A. in English from the University of California, Berkeley.

In 1964, Ammons joined the faculty of Cornell University, eventually becoming Goldwin Smith Professor of English and Poet in Residence. He retired from Cornell in 1998. His students who went on to achieve acclaim as poets include Alice Fulton, Ann Loomis Silsbee, and Jerald Bullis.

Ammons had been a longtime resident of the South Jersey communities of Northfield, Ocean City and Millville, when he wrote Corsons Inlet in 1962.

== Ammons at Cornell University ==
When Ammons arrived at Cornell University in 1964 to teach creative writing, he had not yet finished his master's degree at the University of California, Berkeley. While somewhat self-conscious about his lack of academic pedigree compared to his colleagues, Ammons established himself quickly by completing and publishing six well-received volumes and earning tenure in 1969. Ammons met literary critic Harold Bloom, who visited Cornell in 1968 as a fellow of the Society for the Humanities. Bloom is often credited with elevating Ammons's reputation in his early career, and the two maintained a lifelong relationship, frequently corresponding on both personal and literary subjects. Ammons also developed a close relationship with poet Robert Morgan, who joined the Cornell English Department 1971 and remained there alongside Ammons for nearly three decades. Both from North Carolina, Ammons and Morgan bonded over their similar upbringings; and though they embraced distinct poetic styles, the two poets praised each other's work throughout their careers.

In step with his thematic focus on nature, Ammons drew inspiration for his work from the surrounding landscape of Ithaca, New York. His poems "Cascadilla Falls" and "Triphammer Bridge" pay tribute to outdoor landmarks in the area.

== Awards ==
During the five decades of his poetic career, Ammons was the recipient of many awards and citations. Among his major honors are the 1973 and 1993 U.S. National Book Awards (for Collected Poems, 1951–1971 and for Garbage); the Wallace Stevens Award from the Academy of American Poets (1998); and a MacArthur Fellowship in 1981, the year the award was established.

Ammons's other awards include a 1981 National Book Critics Circle Award for A Coast of Trees; a 1993 Library of Congress Rebekah Johnson Bobbitt National Prize for Poetry for Garbage; the 1975 Bollingen Prize for Sphere; the Poetry Society of America's Robert Frost Medal; the Ruth Lilly Prize; and fellowships from the Guggenheim Foundation and the American Academy of Arts and Letters. He was elected a Fellow of the American Academy of Arts and Sciences in 1978.

== Poetic style ==
Ammons commonly writes in two- or three-line stanzas, in which lines are unrhymed and strongly enjambed. Some of Ammons's poems are as short as one to two lines. Others, like Ammons's book-length poems Sphere, Tape for the Turn of the Year, and Garbage, are hundreds of lines long.

Ammons is noted for his idiosyncratic, minimalist approach to punctuation. The colon is Ammons "signature" punctuation mark, which he employs in many contexts to divide clauses while delaying a definitive end. Ammons avoids ending poems with periods. Some of his poems end in ellipses, or in no punctuation at all.

== Bibliography ==
=== Poetry ===
- Ommateum, with Doxology. Philadelphia: Dorrance, 1955. Reprinted, with Preface by Roger Gilbert, Cornell University, by W.W. Norton & Company, Inc., New York & London, 2006. ISBN 978-0-393-33054-0 (paperback)
- Expressions of Sea Level. Columbus: Ohio State UP, 1964.
- Corsons Inlet. Ithaca, NY: Cornell UP, 1965. Reprinted by Norton, 1967. ISBN 0-393-04463-7
- Tape for the Turn of the Year. Ithaca, NY: Cornell UP, 1965. Reprinted by Norton, 1972. ISBN 0-393-00659-X
- Northfield Poems. Ithaca, NY: Cornell UP, 1966.
- Selected Poems. Ithaca, NY: Cornell UP, 1968.
- Uplands. New York: Norton, 1970. ISBN 0-393-04322-3
- Briefings: Poems Small and Easy. New York: Norton, 1971. ISBN 0-393-04326-6
- Collected Poems, 1951-1971. New York: Norton, 1972. ISBN 0-393-04241-3 – winner of the National Book Award
- Sphere: The Form of a Motion. New York: Norton, 1974. ISBN 0-393-04388-6 —winner of the Bollingen Prize for Poetry
- Diversifications. New York: Norton, 1975. ISBN 0-393-04414-9
- The Selected Poems: 1951–1977. New York: Norton, 1977. ISBN 0-393-04465-3
- Highgate Road. Ithaca, NY: Cornell UP, 1977.
- The Snow Poems . New York: Norton, 1977. ISBN 0-393-04467-X
- Selected Longer Poems. New York: Norton, 1980. ISBN 0-393-01297-2
- A Coast of Trees. New York: Norton, 1981. ISBN 0-393-01447-9 – winner of the National Book Critics Circle Award
- Worldly Hopes. New York: Norton, 1982. ISBN 0-393-01518-1
- Lake Effect Country. New York: Norton, 1983. ISBN 0-393-01702-8
- The Selected Poems: Expanded Edition. New York: Norton, 1986. ISBN 0-393-02411-3
- Sumerian Vistas. New York: Norton, 1987. ISBN 0-393-02468-7
- The Really Short Poems. New York: Norton, 1991. ISBN 0-393-02870-4
- Garbage. New York: Norton, 1993. ISBN 0-393-03542-5 – winner of the National Book Award
- The North Carolina Poems. Alex Albright, ed. Rocky Mount, NC: NC Wesleyan College P, 1994. ISBN 0-933598-51-3
- Brink Road.New York: Norton, 1996. ISBN 0-393-03958-7
- Glare. New York: Norton, 1997. ISBN 0-393-04096-8
- Bosh and Flapdoodle: Poems. New York: Norton, 2005. ISBN 0-393-05952-9
- Selected Poems. David Lehman, ed. New York: Library of America, 2006. ISBN 1-931082-93-6
- The North Carolina Poems. New, expanded edition. Frankfort, KY: Broadstone Books, 2010. ISBN 978-0-9802117-2-6
- The Mule Poems. Fountain, NC: R. A. Fountain, 2010. ISBN 0-9842102-0-2 (chapbook)
- The Complete Poems of A. R. Ammons, Volume 1 1955–1977; Volume 2 1978–2005: Edited by Robert M. West; Introduction by Helen Vendler. W.W. Norton & Company, Inc., New York, 2017 ISBN 9780393070132 hardcover vol. 1; ISBN 9780393254891 hardcover vol. 2

=== Prose ===
- Burr, Zofia, ed. (1996). Set in Motion: Essays, Interviews, and Dialogues. Ann Arbor: University of Michigan Press. ISBN 9780472022380. OCLC 593246463.
- An Image for Longing: Selected Letters and Journals of A.R. Ammons, 1951–1974. Ed. Kevin McGuirk. Victoria, BC: ELS Editions, 2014. ISBN 978-1550584561

=== Critical studies and reviews of Ammons's work ===
- Bloom, Harold (1971), The Ringers in the Tower: Studies in Romantic Tradition, Chicago: University of Chicago Press, ISBN 9780226060491
- Diacritics 3 (1973). An entire "essays on Ammons" issue.
- "A.R. Ammons", Poetry Foundation, 2011, archived from the original on April 23, 2016
- Wilson, Emily Herring (January 20, 2011), "The A.R. Ammons I Knew", Wake Forest Magazine
- Chiasson, Dan (December 4, 2017). "One man's trash : how A.R. Ammons turned the everyday into art". The Critics. Books. The New Yorker. Vol. 93, no. 39. pp. 69–72.
- Bevis, Matthew (March 7, 2019). "Gravity's Smoothest Dream". London Review of Books. 41 (5): 31–35. Review of A.R. Ammons, The Complete Poems.
