= David Lehman =

American poet (born 1948)

- Born: June 11, 1948 (age 78); New York City, New York
- Education: Columbia University (BA, PhD); University of Cambridge
- Occupations: Poet, critic, writer
- Spouse: Stacey Harwood
- Writing career
- Notable work: The Best American Poetry
- Notable awards: Guggenheim Fellowship (1989)

David Lehman (born June 11, 1948) is an American poet, non-fiction writer, literary critic, and the founder and series editor for The Best American Poetry. He was a writer and freelance journalist for fifteen years, writing for such publications as Newsweek, The Wall Street Journal, and The New York Times. In 2006, Lehman served as Editor for the new Oxford Book of American Poetry. He taught and was the Poetry Coordinator at The New School in New York City until May 2018.

== Career ==
Born in New York City on June 11, 1948, David Lehman grew up the son of European Holocaust refugees in Manhattan's northernmost neighborhood of Inwood. He attended Stuyvesant High School and Columbia University, and Cambridge University in England on a Kellett Fellowship. On his return to New York, he received a Ph.D. in English from Columbia, where he was Lionel Trilling's research assistant. Lehman's poem "The Presidential Years" appeared in The Paris Review No. 43 (Summer 1968) while he was a Columbia undergraduate. The poem was awarded Columbia's Van Rensselaer Poetry Prize in 1967. In 1970 he was named a Woodrow Wilson Fellow and was elected to Phi Beta Kappa.

Lehman taught at Brooklyn College, where he shared an office with John Ashbery, for a year. For four years starting in 1976, he was an assistant professor of English at Hamilton College, teaching courses in literature and creative writing and chairing the college's lecture committee, bringing prominent speakers to campus. In 1980 he received a post-doctoral fellowship from the Society for the Humanities at Cornell University. He then left academe and became a freelance writer. He wrote numerous book reviews and articles for Newsweek and contributed to such other publications as the New York Times Magazine, the Washington Post Book World, the Los Angeles Times, the Boston Globe, Newsday, the Chicago Tribune, and the Philadelphia Inquirer. He became a contributing editor of Columbia College Today in 1982 and of Partisan Review in 1986. In 1987 he joined the board of the National Book Critics Circle and was named vice president in charge of programs and events. In 1988 he founded The Best American Poetry' annual anthology series. The Perfect Murder (1989) and Signs of the Times: Deconstruction and the Fall of Paul de Man'' (1991) were his first nonfiction books.

Lehman's books of poetry include The Morning Line (2021),Playlist (2019), Poems in the Manner Of (2017), New and Selected Poems (2013), Yeshiva Boys (2009), When a Woman Loves a Man (2005), The Evening Sun (2002), The Daily Mirror (2000), and Valentine Place (1996), all published by Scribner. Princeton University Press published Operation Memory (1990), and An Alternative to Speech (1986). He collaborated with James Cummins on a book of sestinas, Jim and Dave Defeat the Masked Man (Soft Skull Press, 2005), and with Judith Hall on a book of poems and collages, Poetry Forum (Bayeux Arts, 2007). Since 2009, new poems have been published in 32 Poems, The Atlantic, The Awl, Barrow Street, The Common, Green Mountains Review, Hanging Loose, Hot Street, New Ohio Review, The New Yorker, Poetry, Poetry London, Sentence, Smartish Pace, Slate, and The Yale Review.

Lehman's poems appear in Chinese in the bilingual anthology, Contemporary American Poetry, published through a partnership between the NEA and the Chinese government, and in the Mongolian-English Anthology of American Poetry. Lehman's work has been translated into 16 languages overall, including Spanish, French, German, Danish, Russian, Polish, Korean and Japanese. In 2013, his translation of Goethe’s "Wandrers Nachtlied" into English appeared under the title "Goethe’s Nightsong" in The New Republic, and his translation of Guillaume Apollinaire’s "Zone" was published with an introductory essay in Virginia Quarterly Review. The translation and commentary won the journal's Emily Clark Balch Prize for 2014. Additionally, his poem, "French Movie" appears in the third season of Motionpoems.

Lehman is the series editor of The Best American Poetry. The prestigious annual series has 40 volumes published (including special tenth and twenty-fifth anniversary editions); the 2019 volume was edited by Major Jackson; the 2020 book by Paisley Rekdal; the 2021 book, Tracy K. Smith; the 2022 book Matthew Zapruder; the 2023 book, Elaine Equi; the 2024 book Mary Jo Salter, the 2025 book, Terence Winch. Further, Lehman has edited The Oxford Book of American Poetry (Oxford University Press, 2006). The Best American Erotic Poems: From 1800 to the Present (Scribner, 2008), and Great American Prose Poems: From Poe to the Present (Scribner, 2003).

He is the author of twelve nonfiction books, including, most recently, The Mysterious Romance of Murder (2022), One Hundred Autobiographies: A Memoir (2019), Sinatra's Century: One Hundred Notes on the Man and His World'' (2015), and The State of the Art: A Chronicle of American Poetry, 1988-2014 (2015). A Fine Romance: Jewish Songwriters, American Songs (Nextbook, 2009) received the 2010 ASCAP Deems Taylor Award from the American Society of Composers, Authors and Publishers. Sponsored by the American Library Association, Lehman curated, wrote, and designed a traveling library exhibit based on A Fine Romance that toured 55 libraries in 27 states between May 2011 and April 2012 with appearances at three libraries in New York state and Maryland.

In an interview published in Smithsonian Magazine, Lehman discusses the artistry of the great lyricists: “The best song lyrics seem to me so artful, so brilliant, so warm and humorous, with both passion and wit, that my admiration is matched only by my envy ... these lyricists needed to work within boundaries, to get complicated emotions across and fit the lyrics to the music, and to the mood thereof. That takes genius.”

Lehman's other books of criticism include The Last Avant-Garde: The Making of the New York School of Poets (Doubleday, 1998), which was named a "Book to Remember 1999" by the New York Public Library; The Big Question (1995); The Line Forms Here (1992) and Signs of the Times: Deconstruction and the Fall of Paul de Man (1991). His study of detective novels, The Perfect Murder (1989), was nominated for an Edgar Award from the Mystery Writers of America. A new edition of The Perfect Murder appeared in 2000. In October 2015, he published Sinatra's Century: One Hundred Notes on the Man and His World, which Geoffrey O'Brien in "The New York Review of Books" praised as an "engaging, playful, deeply personal, and elegantly concise tribute."

Lehman made his living primarily as a journalist and free-lance writer for fifteen years. His by-line appeared frequently in Newsweek in the 1980s and he has continued writing for general-interest magazines and newspapers, among them The New York Times, The Wall Street Journal, American Heritage, the Washington Post, People, The Academy of American Poets, National Public Radio, Salon, Slate, Smithsonian, and Art in America. He has been a contributing editor at The American Scholar, since 2009. From May 2014 until September 2019, he acted as quiz master for the weekly column Next Line, Please, a public poetry-writing contest. The first project was a crowd-sourced sonnet, "Monday," which was completed in August 2014. There followed a haiku, a tanka, an anagram based on Ralph Waldo Emerson's middle name, a couplet (which grew into a "sonnet ghazal"), and a "shortest story" competition. Lehman devises the puzzles — or prompts — and judges the results. Lehman now writes a column on movies for The American Scholar, and since fall 2024 he has reprised the "Next Line, Please" poetry challenges.

The Library of Congress commissioned an essay from Lehman, “Peace and War in American Poetry,” and posted it online in April 2013. In 2013, Lehman wrote the introduction to The Collected Poems of Joseph Ceravolo. He had previously written introductory essays to books by A. R. Ammons, Kenneth Koch, Philip Larkin, Alfred Leslie, Fairfield Porter, Karl Shapiro, and Mark Van Doren.

In 1994 Lehman succeeded Donald Hall as the general editor of the University of Michigan Press’s Poets on Poetry series, a position he held for twelve years. In 1997 he teamed with Star Black in creating and directing the famed KGB Bar Monday-night poetry series in New York City’s East Village. Lehman and Black co-edited The KGB Bar Book of Poems (HarperCollins, 2000). They directed the reading series until 2003.

Lehman taught in the graduate writing program of the New School in New York City since the program's inception in 1996 and served as poetry coordinator from 2003 to 2018. In an interview with Thomas M. Disch in the Cortland Review, Lehman addresses his great variety of poetic styles: "I write in a lot of different styles and forms on the theory that the poems all sound like me in the end, so why not make them as different from one another as possible, at least in outward appearance? If you write a new poem every day, you will probably have by the end of the year, if you’re me, an acrostic, an abecedarium, a sonnet or two, a couple of prose poems, poems that have arbitrary restrictions, such as the one I did that has only two words per line."

Lehman has been awarded fellowships from the John Simon Guggenheim Memorial Foundation, the Ingram Merrill Foundation, and the NEA, and received an award in literature from the American Academy of Arts and Letters and a Lila Wallace-Reader's Digest Writer's Award. The Lila Wallace grant enabled Lehman to organize and host a series of poetry readings and school visitations in collaboration with the Community School of Music and Art in Ithaca, New York. The visiting poets were Mark Strand and Donald Hall (1992), Charles Simic, Jorie Graham, and A. R. Ammons (1993), and Louise Gluck, Kenneth Koch, and John Ashbery (1994). In 2025, the editors of The New Criterion awarded Lehman the twenty-fifth New Criterion Poetry Prize, given "each year to a book-length manuscript of poems that pay close attention to form." The judges were Editor & Publisher Roger Kimball, Poetry Editor Adam Kirsch, and the poet Peter Filkins.

Lehman's fiction has appeared in The New Yorker and Tablet.

Lehman has lectured widely in the United States and abroad. He divides his time between Ithaca, New York, and New York City. He is married to Stacey Harwood.

== Bibliography ==
=== Poetry ===
Collections

- Lehman, David (1986). An alternative to speech. Princeton, N.J.: Princeton University Press.
- The Perfect Murder: A Study in Detection (The Free Press, 1989; revised ed. Michigan 2000)
- Operation Memory (Princeton, 1990)
- Signs of the Times: Deconstruction and the Fall of Paul de Man (Poseidon / Simon & Schuster, 1991)
- The Line Forms Here (Michigan, 1992)
- The Big Question (Michigan, 1995)
- Valentine Place (Scribner, 1996)
- The Last Avant-Garde: The Making of the New York School of Poets (Doubleday, 1998; Vintage paperback 1979)
- The Daily Mirror: A Journal in Poetry (2000)
- The Evening Sun (Scribner, 2002)
- When a Woman Loves a Man (Scribner, 2005)
- Yeshiva Boys (Scribner, 2009)
- A Fine Romance: Jewish Songwriters, American Songs (Shocken / Random House, 2009)
- New and Selected Poems (Scribner, 2013)
- Poems in the Manner of (Scribner, 2017)
- Playlist (Pittsburgh, 2019)
- The Morning Line (Pittsburgh, 2021)
- Ithaca (Criterion, 2026)

Anthologies and edited collections of other poets

- Next Line, Please(Cornell, 2018)
- The Best of the Best American Poetry: 25th Anniversary Edition with Robert Pinsky (Scribner, 2013)
- The Best American Erotic Poems (Scribner, 2008)
- The Oxford Book of American Poetry (2006)
- Ammons, A. R. (2006). David Lehman (ed.). Selected poems. New York: Library of America.
- Great American Prose Poems: From Poe to the Present (2003)
- The KGB Bar Book of Poems with Star Black (HarperCollins, 2000)
- The Best of the Best American Poetry, 1988-1997 with Harold Bloom (Scribner, 1998)
- Ecstatic Occasions, Expedient Forms: 85 Leading Contemporary Poets Select and Comment on Their Poems (1987, expanded 1996, ISBN 0472066331)

Series editor for The Best American Poetry with annual guest editors

- John Ashbery (1988)
- Donald Hall (1989)
- Jorie Graham (1990)
- Mark Strand (1991)
- Charles Simic (1992)
- Louise Glück (1993)
- A. R. Ammons (1994)
- Richard Howard (1995)
- Adrienne Rich (1996)
- James Tate (1997)
- John Hollander (1998)
- Robert Bly (1999)
- Rita Dove (2000)
- Robert Hass (2001)
- Robert Creeley (2002)
- Yusef Komunyakaa (2003)
- Lyn Hejinian (2004)
- Paul Muldoon (2005)
- Billy Collins (2006)
- Heather McHugh (2007)
- Charles Wright (2008)
- David Wagoner (2009)
- Amy Gerstler (2010)
- Kevin Young (2011)
- Mark Doty (2012)
- Denise Duhamel (2013)
- Terrance Hayes (2014)
- Sherman Alexie (2015)
- Edward Hirsch (2016)
- Natasha Tretheway (2017)
- Dana Gioia (2018)
- Major Jackson (2019)
- Paisley Rekdal (2020)
- Tracy K. Smith (2021)
- Matthew Zapruder (2022)
- Elaine Equi (2023)
- Mary Jo Salter (2024)
- Terence Winch (2025)

Other

- The State of the Art: A Chronicle of American Poetry, 1988-2014 (Pittsburgh, 2015)
- Jim and Dave Defeat the Masked Man with James Cummins and Archie Rand (Soft Skull Press, 2005)
- Poetry Forum: A Play Poem: A Pl'em with Judith Hall (Bayeux Arts, 2007)

List of poems

Title	Year	First published	Reprinted/collected
It could happen to you	2017	Lehman, David (December 4, 2017). "It could happen to you". The New Yorker. 93 (39): 54.	
Conventional wisdom	2023	Lehman, David (February 2023). "Conventional wisdom". Commonweal. 150 (2): 39.	
Poetics	2023	Lehman, David (February 2023). "Poetics". Commonweal. 150 (2): 39.	

=== Memoirs ===
- Lehman, David (2019). One hundred autobiographies : a memoir. Ithaca: Cornell University Press.

=== Critical studies, reviews and biographies ===
- Beyond Amazement: New Essays on John Ashbery (1980)
- James Merrill: Essays in Criticism with Charles Berger (Cornell University Press, 1983) ISBN 978-0801414046
- The Perfect Murder: A Study in Detection (2000)
- A Fine Romance: Jewish Songwriters, American Songs (Schocken, New York, 2009)
- Sinatra's Century: One Hundred Notes on the Man and His World (2015)
- The State of the Art: A Chronicle of American Poetry, 1988-2014 (2015)
- The Mysterious Romance of Murder : Crime, Detection, and the Spirit of Noir (2022)
