= The Yale Review =

- Discipline: Literary magazine
- Language: English
- Edited by: Meghan O'Rourke

Publication details
- Former names: The Christian Spectator, The New Englander
- History: 1819–1989, 1991–present
- Publisher: Johns Hopkins University Press for Yale University (United States)
- Frequency: Quarterly

Standard abbreviations
- ISO 4: Yale Rev.

Indexing
- ISSN: 0044-0124 (print); 1467-9736 (web)

Links
- Journal homepage; The Yale Review at Johns Hopkins University Press

The Yale Review is the oldest literary journal in the United States. It is published by Johns Hopkins University Press.

It was founded in 1819 as The Christian Spectator to support Evangelicalism. Over time, it began to publish more on history and economics and was renamed The New Englander in 1843. In 1885, it was renamed The New Englander and Yale Review until 1892, when it took the name The Yale Review. At the same time, editor Henry Walcott Farnam gave the periodical a focus on American and international politics, economics, and history.

The modern history of the journal starts in 1911 under the editorship of Wilbur Cross. Cross remained the editor for thirty years, throughout the magazine's heyday. Contributors during this period, according to the Review's website, included Thomas Mann, Henry Adams, Virginia Woolf, George Santayana, Robert Frost, José Ortega y Gasset, Eugene O'Neill, Leon Trotsky, H. G. Wells, Thomas Wolfe, John Maynard Keynes, H. L. Mencken, A. E. Housman, Ford Madox Ford, and Wallace Stevens.

As of 2026, the editor is Meghan O'Rourke, a nonfiction writer, poet, and critic.

== See also ==
- List of literary magazines
