= The American Poetry Review =

American monthly poetry magazine

- September/October 2003 cover
- Editor: Elizabeth Scanlon
- Former editors: David Bonanno, Stephen Berg, Arthur Vogelsang
- Frequency: Bimonthly
- Founder: Stephen Berg and Stephen Parker
- Founded: 1972; 54 years ago
- Company: World Poetry Inc.
- Country: United States
- Based in: The University of the Arts; Philadelphia, Pennsylvania, U.S.
- Language: English
- Website: www.aprweb.org
- ISSN: 0360-3709

The American Poetry Review (APR) is an American poetry magazine printed every other month on tabloid-sized newsprint. It was founded in 1972 by Stephen Berg and Stephen Parker in Philadelphia, Pennsylvania. The magazine's editor is Elizabeth Scanlon.

== History ==
The American Poetry Review was founded by Berg and Parker in 1972 in Philadelphia. The magazine lacked capital but had "significant support in the national poetry community" according to the magazine's website. In 1973 David Bonanno, a recent graduate of Wesleyan University, joined APR and served as editor of the publication until his death in 2017. The poet Arthur Vogelsang also joined as editor that year, remaining until 2006. By 1976 the publication was being produced and distributed more efficiently, making it "the most widely circulated poetry magazine ever". In 1977 the publication began paying out small salaries to editors and staff and small payments to authors.

In 2001 W.W. Norton & Co. published the anthology The Body Electric: America's Best Poetry from The American Poetry Review. Among the 180 poets included from the pages of APR are Ai, John Ashbery, John Berryman, Charles Bukowski, Lucille Clifton, Carolyn Forche, Allen Ginsberg, Robert Hass, Seamus Heaney, Kenneth Koch, Yusef Komunyakaa, and Derek Walcott.

Founding editor Berg died in 2014. Elizabeth Scanlon is the current editor in chief.

== See also ==
- List of literary magazines
