= 2005 in poetry =

Nationality words link to articles with information on the nation's poetry or literature (for instance, Irish or France).

== Events ==
- October 7 — Celebrations marking the 50th anniversary of the first reading of Allen Ginsberg's poem "Howl" were staged in San Francisco, New York City, and in Leeds in the UK. The British event, Howl for Now, was accompanied by a book of essays of the same name, edited by Simon Warner, reflecting on the piece's enduring power and influence.
- Maurice Riordan, Irish poet living in London, named poetry editor of Poetry London

== Works published in English ==
Listed by nation where the work was first published (and again by the poet's native land, if different); substantially revised works listed separately:

=== Australia ===
- David Brooks, Walking to Point Clear. Blackheath: Brandl & Schlesinger
- Pam Brown, Ken Bolton, and Laurie Duggan, Let's Get Lost, Sydney: Vagabond
- Laurie Duggan, Compared to What: Selected Poems 1971–2003, Exeter: Shearsman
- Alan Gould, The Past Completes Me: Selected Poems 1973–2003
- John Kinsella, The New Arcadia, winner of the 2006 Arts Queensland Judith Wright Calanthe Award; W.W. Norton; Australian living in and published in the United States
- Jennifer Maiden, Friendly Fire Giramondo, ISBN 1-920882-12-X
- Chris Mansell, Mortifications & Lies (Kardoorair, Armidale) ISBN 0-908244-60-6
- Les Murray:
  - Hell and After, Four early English-language poets of Australia, Carcanet
  - Editor, Best Australian Poems 2004, Melbourne, Black Inc.
- Philip Salom, The Well Mouth, Fremantle Arts Centre, ISBN 978-1-921064-24-1
- Jaya Savige, Latecomers
- Chris Wallace-Crabbe, The Universe Looks Down, Brandl & Schlesinger, ISBN 1-876040-74-2

=== Canada ===
- Shannon Bramer, The Refrigerator Memory (Coach House Books) ISBN 978-1-55245-154-0
- Stephen Cain, American Standard/Canada Dry (Coach House Books) ISBN 978-1-55245-152-6
- Margaret Christakos:
  - Sooner (Coach House Books) ISBN 978-1-55245-159-5
  - Retreat Diary (Toronto: Book Thug)
- Brian Joseph Davis, Portable Altamont (Coach House Books) ISBN 978-1-55245-161-8
- George Elliott Clarke, Illuminated Verses. Toronto: Canadian Scholars' Press, ISBN 1-55130-280-2
- Anne Compton, Processional
- Sylvia Legris, Nerve Squall, winner of 2006 Pat Lowther Award, winner of the 2006 Canadian Griffin Poetry Prize, shortlisted for Saskatchewan Book Award (Coach House Books) ISBN 978-1-55245-160-1
- Michael Palmer, Company of Moths, shortlisted for the Griffin Poetry Prize (2006)
- John Pass, Stumbling in the Bloom (ISBN 0-88982-201-8), Governor General's Award 2006.
- James Reaney, Souwesto Home. Stan Dragland, ed. (Brick Books)
- Sherwin Tija, The World is a Heartbreaker (Coach House Books), ISBN 978-1-55245-153-3

=== India, in English ===
- Meena Alexander, editor, Indian Love Poems (poetry in English), Everyman's Library/Knopf, anthology, by an Indian writing living in and published in the United States
- Dilip Chitre, Post Climactic Love Poem (poetry in English), a single, long poem; London and New Delhi: Aark Arts;
- Jayanta Mahapatra, Random Descent( Poetry in English ), Third Eye Communications,
- Jerry Pinto and Arundhathi Subramaniam, Confronting Love, contemporary Indian love poetry in English; Penguin India, ISBN 0-14-303264-X
- K. Siva Reddy, Mohana! Oh Mohana! and Other Poems, translated from the original Telugu by M. Sridhar and Alladi Uma, New Delhi: Sahitya Akademi, ISBN 81-260-2162-4.
- Melanie Silgardo and Eunice de Souza, editors, The Puffin Book of Poetry for Children, New Delhi: Puffin Books, ISBN 0-14-333596-0
- Eunice de Souza, editor, Early Indian Poetry in English: An Anthology: 1829–1947, New Delhi: Oxford University Press, ISBN 0-19-565616-4.
- Arundhathi Subramaniam, Where I Live, Mumbai: Allied, ISBN 81-7764-738-5; Indian, English-language
- Arundhathi Subramaniam, co-editor, Confronting Love, Delhi: Penguin India, ISBN 0-14-303264-X; an anthology of contemporary love poetry

=== Ireland ===
- Sara Berkeley, Strawberry Thief, Oldcastle: The Gallery Press, ISBN 978-1-85235-389-6
- Ciaran Carson (translator), The Midnight Court (Cúirt An Mhéan Oíche), an 18th-century poem by Brian Merriman, Oldcastle: The Gallery Press, ISBN 978-1-85235-386-5
- Eiléan Ní Chuilleanáin:
  - Verbale by Michele Ranchetti, translated by Eiléan Ní Chuilleanáin and others, Dublin: Instituto Italiano di Cultura
  - After the Raising of Lazarus: Poems Translated from the Romanian by Eiléan Ní Chuilleanáin, poems by Ileana Mălăncioiu, Cork: Southword Editions
- Seán Dunne, Collected, Oldcastle: The Gallery Press, ISBN 978-1-85235-395-7
- Thomas McCarthy, Merchant Prince, Anvil Press, London, Irish work published in the United Kingdom
- Immanuel Mifsud, translated by Maurice Riordan, Confidential Reports, Maltese poet published in Ireland, Southword Editions
- Justin Quinn, American Errancy: Empire, Sublimity and Modern Poetry, University College of Dublin Press (scholarship)
- Gabriel Rosenstock, I Met A Man ... Doghouse Books, ISBN 0-9546487-9-X

=== New Zealand ===
- Raewyn Alexander:
  - It's a Secret: Selected Poems (Auckland: Brightsparkbooks)
  - Writing Poetry: Fireworks, Clay & Architecture (Auckland: Brightsparkbooks)
- Stu Bagby, As it was in the beginning (Steele Roberts Publications Ltd)
- Wystan Curnow, Modern Colours (Jack Books)
- Stephanie de Montalk, Cover Stories (Victoria University Press)
- Anne Kennedy, Time of the Giants (Auckland University Press)
- Michele Leggott, Milk & Honey, Auckland: Auckland University Press
- Bill Manhire, Lifted, New Zealand
- Cilla McQueen, Fire-penny, Otago University Press
- Karlo Mila, Dream Fish Floating (Huia Publishers)
- James Norcliffe, Along Blueskin Road (Canterbury University Press)
- Gregory O'Brien, Afternoon of An Evening Train (Victoria University Press)
- Vivienne Plumb, Scarab: A Poetic Documentary (Seraph Press)
- Anna Smaill, The Violinist in Spring (Victoria University Press)
- Robert Sullivan, Voice Carried My Family (Auckland University Press)
- Ian Wedde, Three Regrets and a Hymn to Beauty (Auckland University Press)
- Kate Camp, Beauty Sleep, (Victoria University Press)

==== Poets in Best New Zealand Poems ====
Poems from these 25 poets, selected by Emma Neale were included in Best New Zealand Poems 2004, published online this year:

- Tusiata Avia
- Hinemoana Baker
- Diane Brown
- James Brown
- Geoff Cochrane
- Linda Connell
- Wystan Curnow
- Anne French
- Paula Green
- David Howard
- Andrew Johnston
- Tim Jones
- Anne Kennedy
- Tze Ming Mok
- Peter Olds
- Vincent O'Sullivan
- Vivienne Plumb
- Richard Reeve
- Elizabeth Smither
- Kendrick Smithyman
- C. K. Stead
- Brian Turner
- Sue Wootton
- Sonja Yelich
- Ashleigh Young

=== United Kingdom ===
- Maurice Bowra (died 1971), New Bats in Old Belfries
- Carol Ann Duffy:
  - Another Night Before Christmas (illustrated by Marc Boutavant), John Murray (children's poetry).
  - Rapture, Picador
- John Heath-Stubbs, Pigs Might Fly
- Jackie Kay, Life Mask
- Tim Kendall, Strange Land
- Nick Laird, To a Fault, Northern Ireland-born poet
- José Letria, The Moon Has Written You a Poem, children's poetry translated and adapted by Irish expatriate poet Maurice Riordan from the original Portuguese and published in the UK, WingedChariot Press, Tunbridge Wells, Kent
- Derek Mahon, Harbour Lights. Gallery Press
- Thomas McCarthy, Merchant Prince, London; Anvil Press, Irish work published in the United Kingdom
- Brian Merriman: The Midnight Court (translation by Ciarán Carson of Cúirt an Mhéan Oíche), Gallery Press; Wake Forest University Press, 2006, posthumous
- Pete Morgan, August Light ISBN 1-904614-23-X
- Alice Oswald, Woods etc., Faber and Faber, ISBN 0-571-21852-0

==== Anthologies in the United Kingdom ====
- Alice Oswald, The Thunder Mutters: 101 Poems for the Planet (editor), Faber and Faber, ISBN 0-571-21854-7
- Nii Ayikwei Parkes and Kadija Sesay, Dance the Guns to Silence: 100 Poems for Ken Saro-Wiwa (flipped eye), anthology with a foreword by Saro-Wiwa's son, Ken Wiwa, including poems by Mutabaruka, Sharan Strange, Chris Abani, Jayne Cortez, Kwame Dawes, Amiri Baraka, Kamau Braithwaite; and poems in Catalan, Scots, Creole, Castilian paying tribute to Khana, Saro-Wiwa's mother tongue.

==== Criticism, scholarship and biography in the United Kingdom ====
- Elaine Feinstein, Anna of all the Russias: A life of Anna Akhmatova, London: Weidenfeld & Nicolson, 2005 (ISBN 0-297-64309-6); N.Y.: Alfred A. Knopf, 2006 (ISBN 1-4000-4089-2)

=== United States ===
- Elizabeth Alexander, American Sublime
- Meena Alexander, editor, Indian Love Poems, Everyman's Library/Knopf, anthology, by an Indian writing living in and published in the United States
- John Ashbery, Where Shall I Wander
- Bei Dao, Midnight's Gate translation by Matthew Fryslie, edited by Christopher Mattison (New Directions), ISBN 0-8112-1584-9
- Ted Berrigan, Collected Poems (University of California Press), edited by his widow Alice Notley and sons Anselm and Edmund Berrigan, posthumous
- Frank Bidart, Star Dust, one of The New York Times "100 Notable Books of the Year"
- Oscar Brown Jr., What It Is: Poems and Opinions of Oscar Brown Jr. (Oyster Knife Publishing)
- Charles Bukowski, The Flash of Lightning Behind the Mountain: New Poems (Ecco)
- Ana Castillo, Watercolor Women/Opaque Men in Verse (Curbstone Press)
- Adrian Castro, Wise Fish: Tales in 6/8 Time (Coffee House Press)
- Dan Chiasson, Natural History: Poems, one of The New York Times "100 Notable books of the year"
- Henri Cole, Vingt-Deux Poèmes(Yvon Lambert, Paris)
- Billy Collins, The Trouble With Poetry and Other Poems (ISBN 0-375-50382-X)
- Mark Doty, School of the Arts, HarperCollins
- Forrest Gander, Eye Against Eye (New Directions)
- Jorie Graham, Overlord: Poems, one of The New York Times "100 Notable books of the year"
- Suheir Hammad, ZaatarDiva
- Allison Hedge Coke, Off-Season City Pipe Coffee House Press
- Michael Hofmann, translator, Ashes for Breakfast: Selected Poems by Durs Grünbein, German, Macmillan/Farrar, Straus and Giroux
- John Hollander, editor, Poems Bewitched and Haunted
- Paul Hoover, Poems in Spanish (Omnidawn Publishing)
- June Jordan, Directed by Desire: The Collected Poems of June Jordan (Copper Canyon Press), posthumous
- Ted Kooser, Delights and Shadows (Copper Canyon Press)
- Stanley Kunitz, The Collected Poems (W. W. Norton)
- Laurie Lamon, The Fork Without Hunger, CavanKerry Press
- James McMichael, Capacity, a book-length poem and finalist for the 2006 National Book Award for Poetry
- W. S. Merwin:
  - Migration: New and Selected Poems, awarded the National Book Award for Poetry this year; Port Townsend, Washington: Copper Canyon Press
  - Present Company, Port Townsend, Washington: Copper Canyon Press
  - Translator: Sir Gawain and the Green Knight, a New Verse Translation, New York: Knopf
- W. K. Lawrence, State of Love and Trust
- David Lehman, editor, Great American Prose Poems: From Poe to the Present (Scribner), an anthology
- William Logan, The Whispering Gallery
- Richard Loranger, Poems for Teeth (We Press)
- Claire Lux and John Most, Atelier (AQP Collective)
- W. S. Merwin, Migration: New and Selected Poems, one of The New York Times "100 Notable books of the year"
- Ange Mlinko, Starred Wire (Coffee House Press, 2005), winner of the 2004 National Poetry Series
- Rusty Morrison, Whethering, University Press of Colorado, January, ISBN 978-1-885635-07-5
- Sharon Olds, Strike Sparks: Selected Poems, 1980–2002 (Knopf)
- Jason Shinder, editor, The Poem That Changed America: "Howl" Fifty Years Later, essays on the impact of Allen Ginsberg's "Howl" on American literature and culture; Farrar, Straus and Giroux
- Patti Smith, Auguries of Innocence
- Tony Tost, World Jelly
- Brian Turner, Here, Bullet (Alice James Books), war poetry
- Richard Wilbur, Collected Poems, 1943–2004 (Harvest Books), one of The New York Times "100 Notable books of the year"
- Marvin X, Land of My Daughters: Poems 1995–2005 (Black Bird Press)
- Jesse Lee Kercheval, Chartreuse (Hollyridge Press)

==== Poets whose works appeared in The Best American Poetry 2005 ====
The 75 poets included in The Best American Poetry 2005, edited by David Lehman, co-edited this year by Paul Muldoon:

- A. R. Ammons
- John Ashbery
- Maureen Bloomfield
- Catherine Bowman
- Stephanie Brown
- Charles Bukowski
- Elena Karina Byrne
- Victoria Chang
- Shanna Compton
- James Cummins
- Jamey Dunham
- Stephen Dunn
- Karl Elder
- Lynn Emanuel
- Elaine Equi
- Clayton Eshleman
- Andrew Feld
- Beth Ann Fennelly
- Edward Field
- Richard Garcia
- Amy Gerstler
- Leonard Gontarek
- Jessica Goodheart
- George Green
- Arielle Greenberg
- Marilyn Hacker
- Matthea Harvey
- Stacey Harwood
- Terrance Hayes
- Samuel Hazo
- Anthony Hecht
- Jennifer Michael Hecht
- Lyn Hejinian
- Ruth Herschberger
- Jane Hirshfield
- Tony Hoagland
- Vicki Hudspith
- Donald Justice
- Mary Karr
- Garret Keizer
- Brigit Pegeen Kelly
- Galway Kinnell
- Rachel Loden
- Sarah Manguso
- Heather McHugh
- D. Nurske
- Steve Orlen
- Eugene Ostashevsky
- Linda Pastan
- Adrienne Rich
- James Richardson
- Mary Ruefle
- Kay Ryan
- Jerome Sala
- Mary Jo Salter
- Christine Scanlon
- Jason Schneiderman
- Julie Sheehan
- Charles Simic
- Louis Simpson
- W. D. Snodgrass
- Gary Snyder
- Maura Stanton
- Dorothea Tanning
- James Tate
- Chase Twichell
- David Wagoner
- Rosanna Warren
- Marlys West
- Susan Wheeler
- Richard Wilbur
- Cecilia Woloch
- Charles Wright
- Mattew Yeager
- Kevin Young

==== Criticism, scholarship and biography in the United States ====
- Anthony Holden, The Wit in the Dungeon: The Remarkable Life of Leigh Hunt — Poet, Revolutionary, and the Last of the Romantics

== Works published in other languages ==
=== Brazil ===
- Ricardo Domeneck, Carta aos anfíbios, Rio de Janeiro: Bem-Te-Vi
- Miguel Sanches Neto, Venho de um país obscuro e outros poemas
- Marco Vasques, Sístole, Rio de Janeiro: Bem-Te-Vi

=== Chile ===
- Sergio Badilla Castillo, Transrealistic Poems and Some Gospels. 2005. Aura Latina. Santiago/Stockholm.

=== India ===
Listed in alphabetical order by first name:

- Anamika, Khurduri Hatheliyan, Delhi: Radhakrishna Prakashan; Hindi-language
- Basudev Sunani, Karadi Haata, Nuapada: Eeshan-Ankit Prakashani; Oraya-language
- Debashis Chanda, editor, Visual Rhapsody, an anthology including poems by Mithu Sen, New Delhi: Niyogi Offset; Bengali-language
- K. Satchidanandan, Ghazalukal, Geetangal ("Ghazals and Geets"); Malayalam-language
- K. Siva Reddy, Atanu-Charitra, Hyderabad: Jhari Poetry Circle; Telugu-language
- Mallika Sengupta, Shreshtha Kabita, Dey's Publishers; Bengali-language
- Namdeo Dhasal, Mee Marale Sooryachya Rathache Ghode Saat, Marathi-language
- S. Joseph, Identity Card, Kottayam: DC Books, ISBN 81-264-1125-2; Malayalam-language
- Tarannum Riyaz, Purani Kitabon ki Khushboo, New Delhi: Modern Publishing House; Urdu-language
- Udaya Narayana Singh, Madhyampurush Ekvachan, New Delhi: Vani Prakashan; Maithili-language

=== Bangladesh ===
- Rahman Henry, Tomake Basona Kori, A Book of Poetry in Bengali, BALAKA, Chittagong, Bangladesh.
- Rahman Henry, Khunjhara Nodi ("The River that Bleeds"), A Book of Poetry in Bengali, BALAKA, Chittagong, Bangladesh.

=== Poland ===
- Tomasz Różycki, translator, Rzut kośćmi nigdy nie zniesie przypadku, translated from the original French of Stéphane Mallarmé, Kraków: Korporacja Ha!Art
- Eugeniusz Tkaczyszyn-Dycki, Dzieje rodzin polskich
- Adam Zagajewski, Anteny, Kraków: a5
- Wisława Szymborska, Dwukropek ("Colon")

=== Other languages ===
- Nicole Brossard, editor, Anthologie: De la poésie des femmes au Québec des origines à nos jours, Rémue-Ménage, France
- Dmitry Bykov, Boris Pasternak, published by Molodaya Gvardiya, received the "National Bestseller Prize", biography, Russia
- Abdellatif Laabi, Écris la vie, La Différence, coll. Clepsydre, Paris, Prix Alain Bosquet 2006, Moroccan author writing in French and published in France
- Pavel Nastin, Yazyk Zhestov ("Sign Language"); Russia
- Rami Saari, Ha-shogun Ha-xamishi ("The Fifth Shogun"), Israel

== Awards and honors ==
=== International ===
- Nobel prize: Harold Pinter
- Golden Wreath of Poetry: William S. Merwin (United States)

=== Australia ===
- C. J. Dennis Prize for Poetry: M. T. C. Cronin, <More or Less Than> 1–100
- Kenneth Slessor Prize for Poetry: Samuel Wagan Watson, Smoke Encrypted Whispers

=== Canada ===
- Archibald Lampman Award: Stephen Brockwell, Fruitfly Geographic
- Atlantic Poetry Prize: David Helwig, The Year One
- Gerald Lampert Award: Ray Hsu, Anthropy
- Governor General's Literary Awards: Anne Compton, Processional (English); Jean-Marc Desgent, Vingtièmes siècles (French)
- Griffin Poetry Prize: Canadian: Roo Borson, Short Journey Upriver Toward Oishida
- Griffin Poetry Prize: International, in the English Language: Charles Simic, Selected Poems: 1963–2003
- Pat Lowther Award: Roo Borson, Short Journey Upriver Toward Oishida
- Prix Alain-Grandbois: Robert Melançon, Le Paradis des apparences
- Dorothy Livesay Poetry Prize: Jan Zwicky, Robinson's Crossing
- Prix Émile-Nelligan: Renée Gagnon, Des fois que je tombe

=== New Zealand ===
- Prime Minister's Awards for Literary Achievement:
- Montana New Zealand Book Awards First-book award for poetry
  - Poetry: Sonja Yelich, Clung, Auckland University Press
  - NZSA Jessie Mackay Best First Book Award for Poetry: Sonja Yelich, Clung. Auckland University Press

=== United Kingdom ===
- Cholmondeley Award: Jane Duran, Christopher Logue, M. R. Peacocke, Neil Rollinson
- Eric Gregory Award: Melanie Challenger, Carolyn Jess, Luke Kennard, Jaim Smith
- Forward Poetry Prize:
  - Best Collection: David Harsent, Legion (Faber & Faber)
  - Best First Collection: Helen Farish, Intimates (Jonathan Cape)
- T. S. Eliot Prize (United Kingdom and Ireland): Carol Ann Duffy, Rapture
- Whitbread Award for poetry (United Kingdom): Christopher Logue, Cold Calls
  - Shortlisted: David Harsent, Legion, Richard Price, Lucky Day, Jane Yeh, Marabou

=== United States ===
- Aiken Taylor Award for Modern American Poetry – B. H. Fairchild
- Agnes Lynch Starrett Poetry Prize awarded to Rick Hilles for Brother Salvage: Poems
- AML Award for poetry to Lance Larsen for In All Their Animal Brilliance
- Arthur Rense Prize awarded to Daniel Hoffman by the American Academy of Arts and Letters
- Bollingen Prize for Poetry, Jay Wright
- Brittingham Prize in Poetry, Susanna Childress Winner, Jagged with Love
- California Poet Laureate: Al Young, appointed
- Crab Orchard Series in Poetry Open Competition Awards: David Hernandez, Always Danger
- Discovery/The Nation Award: Eduardo C. Corral
- Frost Medal: Marie Ponsot
- National Book Award for Poetry: W. S. Merwin: Migration: New and Selected Poems
- North Carolina Poet Laureate: Kathryn Stripling Byer appointed.
- Pulitzer Prize for Poetry: Ted Kooser, Delights & Shadows (ISBN 1-55659-201-9)
- Rhysling Award:
  - Tim Pratt, Soul Searching (Long Form)
  - Greg Beatty, No Ruined Lunar City (Short Form)
- Robert Fitzgerald Prosody Award: Marina Tarlinskaya
- Ruth Lilly Poetry Prize: C. K. Williams
- Wallace Stevens Award: Gerald Stern
- Whiting Awards: Thomas Sayers Ellis, Ilya Kaminsky, John Keene, Dana Levin, Spencer Reece, Tracy K. Smith
- Fellowship of the Academy of American Poets: Claudia Rankine

== Deaths ==
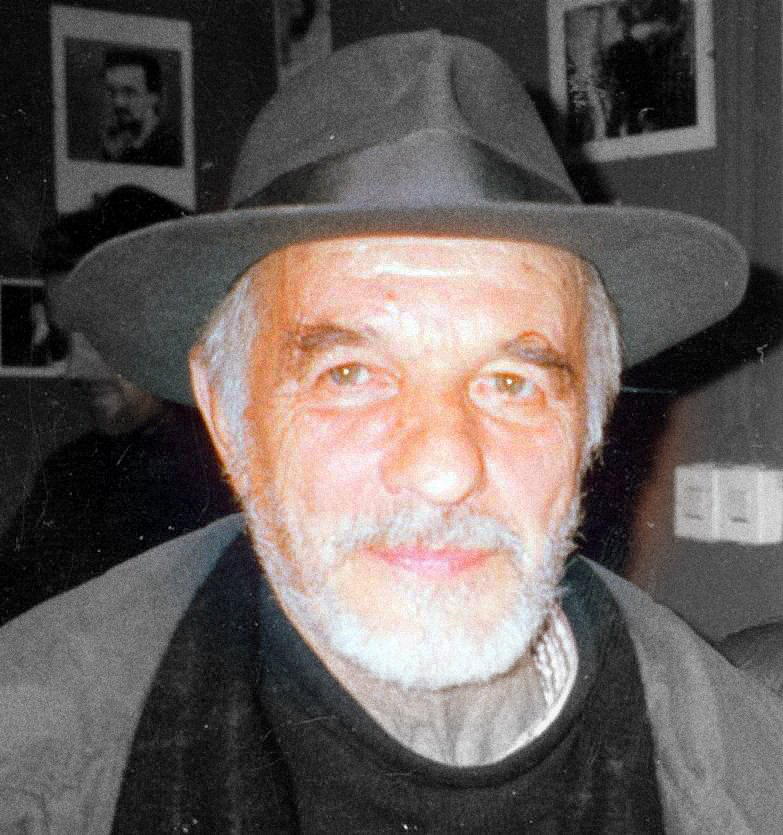
Dane Zajc, Slovenian poet

Birth years link to the corresponding "[year] in poetry" article:

- January 21 - Theun de Vries, born 1907, Dutch writer and poet
- January 31 - Makarand Dave, born 1922, Indian Gujarati-language poet, writer and editor
- February 14 - Sonya Dorman, born 1924, American writer and poet
- February 25 - Phoebe Hesketh, born 1909, British nature poet
- March 6 - Sadako Kurihara 栗原貞子, born 1913, Japanese poet who survived the Hiroshima nuclear holocaust and became known for her poems about her city
- March 7 - Philip Lamantia, born 1927, American beat poet, writer and lecturer
- March 29 - Miltos Sachtouris, born 1919, Greek poet
- March 30 - Robert Creeley, born 1926, American poet associated with the Black Mountain poets
- April 14 - Julia Darling, born 1956, English poet, novelist and playwright, of breast cancer
- June 9 - Hovis Presley, born 1960, English poet and stand-up comedian
- June 13 - Eugénio de Andrade, born 1923, Portuguese lyric poet
- June 23 - Manolis Anagnostakis, born 1925, Greek poet and critic
- June 28 - Philip Hobsbaum, born 1932, Scottish poet and critic
- July 4 - Lorenzo Thomas, born 1944, American poet, critic, essayist; Umbra Workshop founding member
- July 7 - Gustaf Sobin, born 1935, American
- July 30 - Charles Naylor , born 1944, American partner of novelist Thomas Disch
- August 6 - Vizma Belsevica, born 1931, leading post-war Latvian poet
- August 21 - Dahlia Ravikovitch, born 1936, Israeli poet, translator and recipient of the Israel Prize for Poetry in 1998
- August 31 - Amrita Pritam, born 1919, leading Punjabi poet in India who also wrote in Hindi
- September 16 - Stanley Burnshaw, born 1906, American poet and novelist
- October 20 - Dane Zajc, born 1929, Slovenian poet
- November 1 - Michael Thwaites, born 1915, Australian

== See also ==
- Poetry
- List of poetry awards
