= The Best American Poetry 2005 =

The Best American Poetry 2005, a volume in The Best American Poetry series, was edited by David Lehman and by guest editor Paul Muldoon.

The volume is "one of the series' best books in years", according to Maureen N. McLane, reviewing the book in The Chicago Tribune. "None of these poets is hermetic, but many are willing to challenge you as well as to entertain you. Poetry appears here as an art for grownups — not self-serious adults, but actually mature people who treasure serious play and complex comedy as much as filigreed melancholy." The selections clearly have not been chosen simply because the writer is well-known or in order to represent a certain style or group, she wrote. McLane mentioned particularly good selections by Cecilia Woloch, Catherine Bowman, Elaine Equi, Beth Ann Fennelly, Matthea Harvey, Donald Justice, Marilyn Hacker, and A. R. Ammons, as well as Stacey Harwood, whose poem parodies the extensive contributors notes section in the back of the book. Harwood is married to series editor, David Lehman.

== Poets and poems included ==
Poet	Poem	Publication(s) where poem previously appeared
A.R. Ammons	"In View of the Fact"	Epoch
John Ashbery	"In Dearest, Deepest Winter"	Crazyhorse
Maureen Bloomfield	"The Catholic Encyclopedia"	The Cincinnati Review
Catherine Bowman	"I Want to Be Your Shoebox"	Open City
Stephanie Brown	"Roommates: Noblesse Oblige, Sprezzatura, and Gin Lane"	POOL
Charles Bukowski	"The Beats"	New York Quarterly
Elena Karina Byrne	"Irregular Masks"	The Los Angeles Review
Victoria Chang	"Seven Changs"	Michigan Quarterly Review
Shanna Compton	"To Jaques Pepin"	Gastronomica
James Cummins	"The Poets March on Washington"	Jacket
Jamey Dunham	"Urban Myth"	Sentence
Stephen Dunn	"Five Roses in the Morning"	Iowa Review
Karl Elder	"Everything I Needed to Know"	Beloit Poetry Journal, Poetry Daily
Lynn Emanuel	"The Revolution"	Slate
Elaine Equi	"Pre-Raphaelite Pinups"	The New Yorker
Clayton Eshleman	"The Magical Sadness of Omar Caceres"	FENCE
Andrew Feld	"19--: An Elegy"	Michigan Quarterly Review
Beth Ann Fennelly	"I Need to Be More French. Or Japanese."	Ploughshares
Edward Field	"In Praise of My Prostate"	Hanging Loose
Richard Garcia	"Adam and Eve's Dog"	Notre Dame Review
Amy Gerstler	"Watch"	Sycamore Review
Leonard Gontarek	"Blue on Her Hands"	American Poetry Review
Jessica Goodheart	"Advice for a Stegosaurus"	The Antioch Review
George Green	"The Searchers"	Court Green
Arielle Greenberg	"The Turn of the Screw"	American Letters & Commentary
Marilyn Hacker	"For Kateb Yacine (Algerian playwright, novelist, poet, and activist, 1929-89)"	New England Review, PN Review
Matthea Harvey	"I May After Leaving You; Walk Quickly or Even Run"	88
Stacey Harwood	"Contributors' Notes"	LIT
Terrance Hayes	"Variations on Two Black Cinema Treasures"	CROWD
Samuel Hazo	"Seesaws"	The Atlantic Monthly
Anthony Hecht	"Motes A mote it is to trouble the mind's eye."	The New Yorker
Jennifer Michael Hecht	"The Propagation of the Species"	In Posse Review
Lyn Hejinian	"from The Fatalist"	Bomb
Ruth Herschberger	"Remorse After a Panic Attack in a Wisconsin Field, 1975"	New Letters
Jane Hirshfield	"Burlap Sack"	Runes
Tony Hoagland	"In a Quiet Town by the Sea"	The Cincinnati Review
Vicki Hudspith	"Ants"	Mudfish
Donald Justice	"A Chapter in the Life of Mr. Kehoe, Fisherman"	The New Criterion
Mary Karr	"A Blessing from My Sixteen Years' Son"	The New Yorker
Garret Keizer	"Hell and Love"	Image
Brigit Pegeen Kelly	"The Wolf"	32 poems
Galway Kinnell	"Shelley"	The New Yorker
Rachel Loden	"In the Graveyard of Fallen Monuments"	Denver Quarterly, Poetry Daily
Sarah Manguso	"Hell"	Conduit
Heather McHugh	"Ill-Made Almighty"	32 poems, Verse Daily
D. Nurkse	"Space Marriage"	Fence
Steve Orlen	"Song: I Love You. Who are You?"	Gulf Coast
Eugene Ostashevsky	"Dear Owl"	jubilat
Linda Pastan	"Death Is Intended"	Shenandoah
Adrienne Rich	"Dislocations: Seven Scenarios"	Boston Review
James Richardson	"All the Ghosts"	The Paris Review
Mary Ruefle	"How I Became Impossible"	Court Green
Kay Ryan	"Home to Roost"	Poetry
Jerome Sala	"Media Effects"	Insurance Magazine
Mary Jo Salter	"Costanza Bonarelli"	The American Scholar
Christine Scanlon	"The Grilled Cheese Sandwich An Elusive; Essential to Social Success"	Barrow Street, Good Foot
Jason Schneiderman	"Moscow"	Shankpainter
Julie Sheehan	"Hate Poem"	Pleiades
Charles Simic	"Sunlight"	New England Review
Louis Simpson	"An Impasse"	The Hudson Review
W.D. Snodgrass	"For Hughes Cuenod — in his 100th year."	The New Criterion, Early Music America
Gary Snyder	"Waiting for a Ride"	The New Yorker
Maura Stanton	"Twenty Questions"	POOL
Dorothea Tanning	"End of the Day on Second"	The Antioch Review
James Tate	"The Swing"	New American Writing
Chase Twichell	"Marijuana"	The Yale Review
David Wagoner	"For a Man Who Wrote CUNT on a Motel Bathroom Mirror"	Hanging Loose
Rosanna Warren	"From the Notebooks of Anne Verveine, VII"	The New Yorker, Pleine Marge
Marlys West	"Ballad of the Subcontractor"	Notre Dame Review
Susan Wheeler	"from The Maud Project"	Salt
Richard Wilbur	"Some Words Inside of Words (for children and others)"	The Atlantic Monthly
Cecilia Woloch	"Bareback Pantoum"	New Letters
Charles Wright	"A Short History of My Life"	The New Yorker
Matthew Yeager	"A Big Ball of Foil in a Small New York Apartment"	New York Quarterly
Kevin Young	"Black Cat Blues"	The Virginia Quarterly Review

== See also ==
- 2005 in poetry
