= Writer Magazine/Emily Dickinson Award =

The Writer Magazine/Emily Dickinson Award is given once a year to a member of the Poetry Society of America "to honor the memory and poetry of Emily Dickinson, for a poem inspired by Dickinson though not necessarily in her style." The winner receives a $250 prize.

== Winners ==
- 2025: Sasha Roque Pimentel, Judge: Jenny George
- 2024: Trace Howard DePass, Judge: Tawanda Mulalu
- 2023: David Gorin, Judge: Hadara Bar-Nadav
- 2022: Gale Marie Thompson, Judge: Jenny Xie
- 2021: Meredith Stricker, Judge: Deborah Paredez
- 2020: David Keplinger, Judge: Jos Charles
- 2019: Sarah Gridley, Judge: Paula Bohince
- 2018: Nickole Brown, Judge: Lynn Melnick
- 2017: Bill Carty, Judge: Monica Youn
- 2016: Kathleen Winter, Judge: Carmen Giménez Smith
- 2015: Bridget Lowe, Judge: Dana Levin
- 2014: Tom Thompson, Judge: Dan Beachy-Quick
- 2013: Greg Wrenn, Judge: Brian Teare
- 2012: Jennifer Maier, Judge: Phillis Levin
- 2011: Eva Heisler, Judge: H. L. Hix
- 2010: Marlene Rosen Fine, Judge: Marie Ponsot
- 2009: Richard Robbins, Judge: Graham Foust
- 2008: Joanie Mackowski, Judge: Donald Revell
- 2007: James Richardson, Judge: Matthea Harvey
- 2006: Nicole Cooley, Judge: Gerald Stern
- 2005: Lee Upton, Judge: Mark Doty
- 2004: Jason Schneiderman, Judge: Jane Mead
- 2001: Jan Heller Levi, Judge: Lynn Emanuel
- 2000: Jean Merrill Balderston
- 1996: Eve Sutton
- 1995: Lola Haskins

== See also ==
- Poetry Society of America
- List of American literary awards
- List of poetry awards
- List of years in poetry
