= Woloch =

Woloch is a surname. Notable people with the surname include:

- Cecilia Woloch (born 1956), American poet, writer, and teacher
- Isser Woloch (born 1937), American historian
- Nancy Woloch (born 1940), American historian
