= Desire lines (disambiguation) =

A desire line is a synonym to "desire path", a path created by erosion caused by human or animal foot traffic.

Desire line or Desire Lines may also refer to:

== Literature ==
- Desire Lines (1992), a drama by Michael Gurr
- Desire Lines (1997), a book by Jack Gantos
- Desire Lines (1999) by Christina Baker Kline
- Desire Lines (2004), by David R. Ross
- Desire Lines (2004), a collection of poems by Lola Haskins
- Desire Lines (2013), a short story collection by Mary Soderstrom
- "The Desire Lines", a science fiction story by Karl Schroeder from METAtropolis

== Music ==
- Desire Lines, a Camera Obscura album
- "Desire Lines", a Deerhunter song from Halcyon Digest
- "Desire Lines", a track from Split (Lush album)
- "Desire Lines", a track from Ghosts (Cowboy Junkies album)
- "Desire Lines", a track from The Violence (album)
