= At North Farm =

Poem

"At North Farm" is a poem by American poet and writer John Ashbery.

== History and writing ==
The poem first appeared in The New Yorker in 1984. It was the opening poem of Ashbery's 1984 collection A Wave. It was written soon after Ashbery almost died due to an infection.

The poem is in part a reference to the epic poem Kalevala, which Ashbery revisited in his later poem "Finnish Rhapsody".

== Content ==
=== Composition ===
The poem loosely adheres to the form of a sonnet, with the traditional fourteen lines and the octet/sestet of a Petrarchan sonnet. Adhering to the format was not intentional on Ashbery's part.

=== Themes ===
In her review of A Wave, Helen Vendler wrote that the poem deals with the pains of aging using clichés.

=== Allusions and influences ===
The poem is evocative of W. H. Auden's work. Auden had an influence on Ashbery's early poetry, an influence that diminished over the course of his career.

Stephen Greenblatt, writing in Publications of the Modern Language Association of America, referred to the poem as "haunted by" Franz Kafka's brief parable "An Imperial Message".

== Reception ==
Although shorter and simpler than many of his most famous works, it is considered to be a well-known poem of Ashbery's.

== In popular culture ==
"At North Farm" is featured in the 2017 film Marjorie Prime, and John Ashbery is thanked by the director, Michael Almereyda, in the film's credits.
