= Herbert Jepson =

American artist and designer (1908–1993)

Herbert Jepson (June 6, 1908 – July 2, 1993) was an American artist and designer. He founded the Jepson Art Institute in Los Angeles in 1945; among his students were Larry Bell and Joe Goode. He was the father of poet Elena Karina Byrne.
