= Planisphere (poetry collection) =

Book by John Ashbery

- Author: John Ashbery
- Language: English
- Publisher: HarperCollins
- Publication date: 2009
- Publication place: United States
- Pages: 160
- ISBN: 9780061915215

Planisphere is a 2009 poetry collection by the American writer John Ashbery. It consists of 99 alphabetically sequenced poems.

== Reception ==
The book was reviewed in Publishers Weekly, where the critic wrote that Ashbery's "wit is still sharp, the poems still rife with clever juxtapositions and colliding voices", and that "as in his last several books, there's nothing entirely new, but ... the poems are almost always satisfying and strange".

== See also ==
- 2009 in poetry
- American literature
