= Some Trees =

1956 poetry collection by John Ashbery

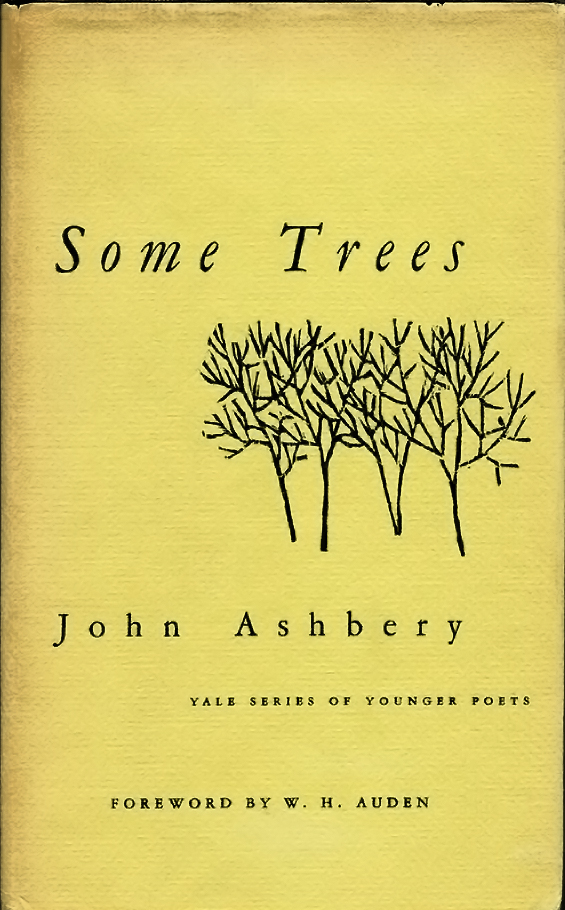
- First edition
- Author: John Ashbery
- Language: English
- Series: Yale Series of Younger Poets
- Release number: Volume 52
- Publisher: Yale University Press
- Publication date: March 28, 1956
- Publication place: United States
- Pages: 87
- OCLC: 771087663

Some Trees is the debut poetry collection by the American writer John Ashbery, published on March 28, 1956 by Yale University Press. Some Trees was the winner of the Yale Series of Younger Poets.

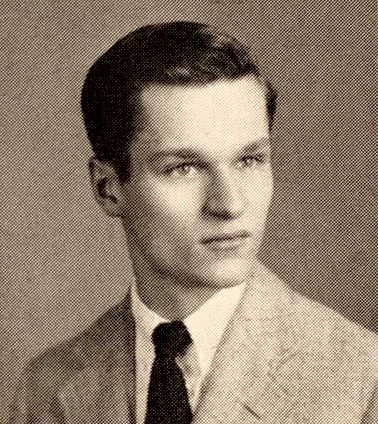
Ashberry, 1945

Many of the poems collected in Some Trees were written while Ashbery was attending Harvard University. "Ashbery was still an undergraduate when he wrote what is perhaps his most popular poem, 'Some Trees,' about a nascent love affair and the efforts of two people to define themselves within it. ... Typically perverse, Ashbery dismisses the poem today. 'A conventional modern poem of that period, my farewell to poetry as we know it—it had a paraphrasable meaning. I don't see my poetry as others see it ... It's a problem of mine.'

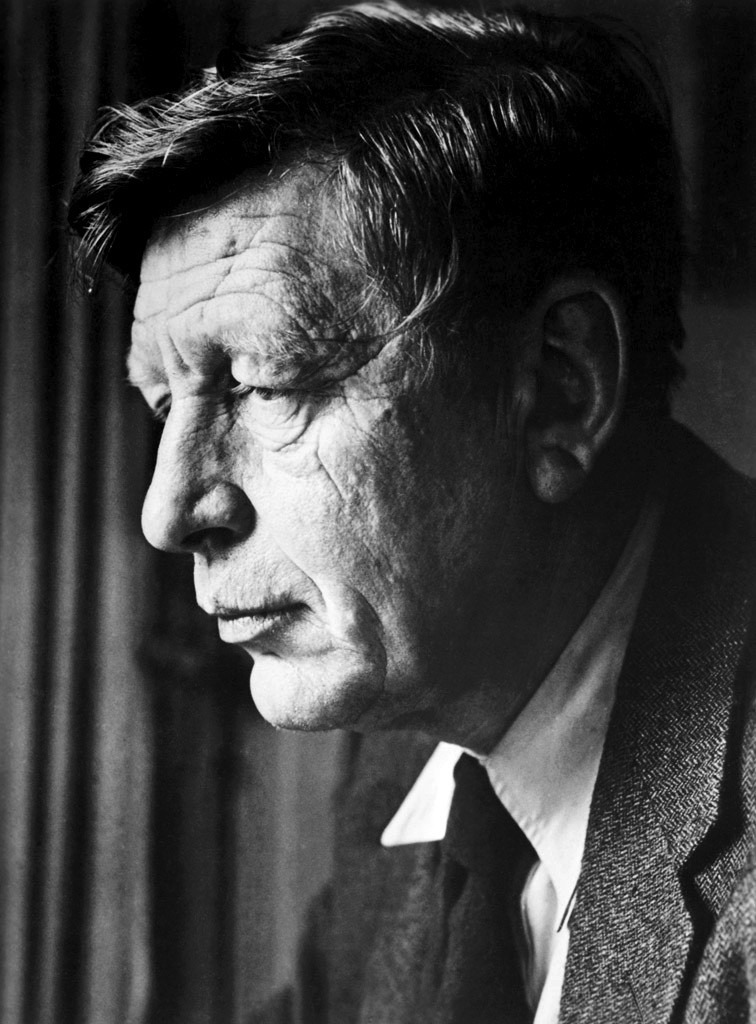
In 1955, Younger Poets judge W. H. Auden (pictured in 1956) was dissatisfied with every submission and almost declared no winner. At the last minute, he was given submissions by Ashbery and Frank O'Hara—both of whom had already been eliminated—and ultimately named Ashbery the winner, despite serious reservations.

== Poems ==
Some Trees contains the following poems:

- "Two Scenes"
- "Popular Songs"
- "Eclogue"
- "The Instruction Manual"
- "The Grapevine"
- "A Boy"
- "Glazunoviana"
- "The Hero"
- "Poem"
- "Album Leaf"
- "The Picture of Little J. A. in a Prospect of Flowers"
- "Pantoum"
- "Grand Abacus"
- "The Mythological Poet"
- "Sonnet"
- "Chaos"
- "The Orioles"
- "The Young Son"
- "The Thinnest Shadow"
- "Canzone"
- "Errors"
- "Illustration"
- "Some Trees"
- "Hotel Dauphin"
- "The Painter"
- "And You Know"
- "He"
- "Meditations of a Parrot"
- "Sonnet"
- "A Long Novel"
- "The Way They Took"
- "The Pied Piper"
- "Answering a Question in the Mountains"
- "A Pastoral"
- "Le livre est sur la table"

== Publication ==
Some Trees was published on March 28, 1956, with a list price of $2.50 (equivalent to about $23 in 2025, adjusted for inflation). Yale University Press printed 817 copies of the first edition. Even given its limited quantity, the book sold poorly; in the words of Dinitia Smith, it "dropped into a bottomless pit." Four years after its publication, only 456 copies had been sold. It took ten years to sell the entire original run.

Corinth Books in New York issued a reprint in December 1970—absent Auden's foreword—with 1,000 hardcover and 2,000 paperback copies. Joe Brainard painted a new cover for this edition. It was reprinted again, in 1978, by Ecco Press. The book has been included in its entirety in Ashbery's compilations The Mooring of Starting Out: The First Five Books of Poetry (1998) and Collected Poems 1956–1987 (2008).

"Although [Frank] O'Hara had lost the competition, he wrote a rave review of Ashbery's book for Poetry, the only good review Ashbery got. Otherwise, Some Trees dropped into a bottomless pit. Eight hundred copies were printed, and it took ten years to sell them all."

In France, "Ashbery waited for news about Some Trees. None came. He would never have a career as a poet, he decided. From now on, he would write only for himself."

== Critical reception ==
Harold Bloom's first exposure to Ashbery: "Mr. Bloom discovered Mr. Ashbery by accident when he was 26, in his second year of teaching at Yale, when he stumbled upon Some Trees in the university bookstore and read it straight through standing up in the aisle."
