= Richard Robbins (poet) =

American poet

Richard Robbins (born in Los Angeles) is an American poet. He grew up in Southern California and Montana. He graduated from San Diego State University, and University of Montana, with an M.F.A. in 1979, where he studied with Richard Hugo and Madeline DeFrees. Before his recent retirement, he taught for 37 years at Minnesota State University, Mankato,

== Awards ==
- Frontier Award
- The Loft Award of Distinction in Poetry
- Minnesota State Arts Board Fellowship
- National Endowment for the Arts Fellowship
- Writer Magazine/Emily Dickinson Award, from the Poetry Society of America.
- Hawthornden Fellowship.

== Works ==
- The Oratory of All Souls, Lynx House Press, 2023, ISBN 978-0-89924-190-6
- Body Turn to Rain: New and Selected Poems, Lynx House Press, 2017, ISBN 978-0899241517
- Other Americas, Blueroad Press, 2010. ISBN 978-0-9796509-3-2
- Radioactive City, Bellday Books, 2009. ISBN 978-0-9793376-2-8
- The Untested Hand. Backwaters Press. 2008. ISBN 978-0-9793934-7-1.
- Famous Persons We Have Known. Eastern Washington University Press. 2000. ISBN 978-0-910055-65-9.
- The Invisible Wedding. University of Missouri Press. 1984. ISBN 0-8262-0438-4.
- Toward New Weather [chapbook], Frontier Award Committee, 1978

=== Editors ===
- Lex Runciman; Richard Robbins, eds. (1978). Where we are: the Montana poets anthology. CutBank/SmokeRoot Press.
