= Nicole Cooley =

American poet

- Education: Brown University; Iowa Writers' Workshop; Emory University (PhD)
- Occupation: Poet
- Writing career
- Notable awards: Walt Whitman Award (1995); Writer Magazine/Emily Dickinson Award (2006)

Nicole Ruth Cooley is an American poet. She has authored six collections of poems, including Resurrection, Breach, Milk Dress, and Of Marriage. Her work has appeared in Poetry, Field, Ploughshares, Poetry Northwest, The Paris Review, PEN America, The Missouri Review, and The Nation. She co-edited, with Pamela Stone, the "Mother" issue of Women's Studies Quarterly.

She grew up in New Orleans, Louisiana and attended the New Orleans Center for Creative Arts. She graduated from Brown University and the Iowa Writers' Workshop, and obtained her Ph.D. from Emory University. Nicole Cooley has taught at Bucknell University. She is currently a professor at Queens College, City University of New York, where she directs the M.F.A. program in Creative Writing and Literary Translation.

== Awards ==
- 1994 "Discovery"/The Nation Award for poetry
- 1995 Walt Whitman Award, chosen by Cynthia Macdonald
- 1996 National Endowment for the Arts literature fellowship (fiction)
- 2006 Writer Magazine/Emily Dickinson Award

== Published works ==
- "Weaning"; "Recto, Verso"; "Overlaying". Womb Poetry. EQUINOX ISSUE 2007.
- "Incunabula". Blackbird Review. 6 (1). Spring 2007.
- "The Speaking Book". Blackbird Review. 6 (1). Spring 2007.
- "Topographies". The Best American Poetry. March 6, 2009.
- "The Flood Notebooks". PEN America. 10: Fear Itself. Archived from the original on 2009-06-03.

=== Poetry ===
- Milk Dress. Alice James Books. 2010. ISBN 978-1-882295-83-8.
- Resurrection. Louisiana State University Press. 1996. ISBN 978-0-8071-2059-0.
- The Afflicted Girls. Louisiana State University Press. 2004. ISBN 978-0-8071-2946-3.
- Breach, Louisiana State University Press, 2009

=== Novel ===
- Judy Garland, Ginger Love. ReganBooks. 1998. ISBN 978-0-06-039251-2.

=== Non-fiction ===
- The Avant-garde at the End of the Century Gertrude Stein, Postmodernism and Contemporary Women Writers. Emory University. 1996.
- Jennifer Margulis, ed. (2003). Toddler. Seal Press. ISBN 978-1-58005-093-7.
- Andrea J. Buchanan, Amy E. Hudock, ed. (2005). "Thirteen Ways of Looking at being a Mother and a Poet". The Best of Literary Mama. Seal Press. ISBN 978-1-58005-158-3.
- Catherine Wagner, Rebecca Wolff, ed. (2007). Not For Mothers Only. Fence Books. ISBN 978-0-9771064-8-6.
- Elrena Evans; Caroline Grant, eds. (2008). Mama PhD; Women Write about Motherhood and Academic Life. Rutgers University Press. ISBN 978-0-8135-4318-5.
- "Thoughts on Poetry and Disaster". Best American Poetry. March 1, 2009.
