= Jan Heller Levi =

American poet

Jan Heller Levi (born 1954, New York City) is a poet who teaches at CUNY Hunter College’s MFA Program in Creative Writing.

== Life ==
She grew up in Baltimore, Maryland. Levi is the recipient of the Walt Whitman Award of the Academy of American Poets for her first book, Once I Gazed at You in Wonder. She has also received two awards form the Poetry Society of America, the George Bogin Memorial Award, and the Writer Magazine/Emily Dickinson Award.

Prior to teaching at Hunter College, Levi also taught at Sarah Lawrence College and the Unterberg Poetry Center of the 92nd Street Y in New York City. She is married to the Swiss novelist and playwright, Christoph Keller, and the couple divide their time between New York City and St. Gallen, Switzerland.

In a review of Once I Gazed at You in Wonder, poet Alice Fulton writes,

Jan Heller Levi's work countervails the implications of this curmudgeonly koan with passional, self-critical intelligence. Ardent yet free of gush, the spontaneity and conversational ease of her poems assure that the quality of wonder, like that of mercy, is not strained. In addition to unguardedness and heart, there is backtalk—bite and edge, lip and lash.

== Bibliography ==
- A Muriel Rukeyser Reader, Edited by Jan Heller Levi (W. W. Norton & Company, Inc., 1995)
- Directed by Desire: The Collected Poems of June Jordan, Edited by Jan Heller Levi (Copper Canyon Press, 2005)
- Collected Poems of Muriel Rukeyser, Consulting Editor: Jan Heller Levi (University of Pittsburgh Press, 2006)
- Once I Gazed at You in Wonder: Poems (Louisiana State University Press, 1999)
- Skyspeak: Poems (Louisiana State University Press, 2005)

== Sources ==
- Rehak, Melanie (November 5, 1999). "Late bloomers". Salon. Archived from the original on July 22, 2012.
- http://www.poets.org/poet.php/prmPID/63
