= Where Shall I Wander =

Book by John Ashbery

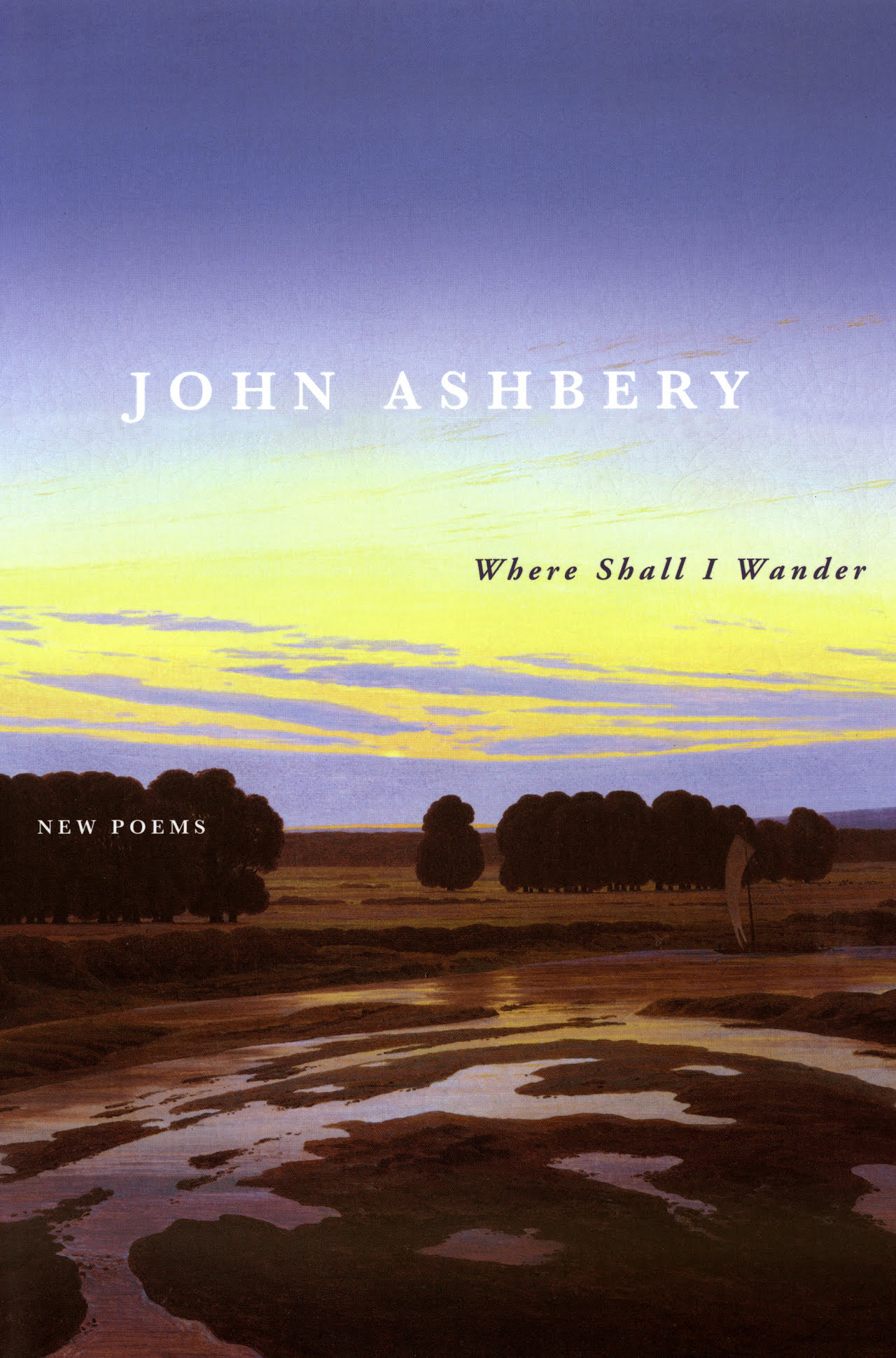
- First edition
- Author: John Ashbery
- Language: English
- Publisher: Ecco Press
- Publication date: 2005
- Publication place: United States
- Pages: 81
- ISBN: 0-06-076529-1

Where Shall I Wander is a 2005 poetry collection by the American writer John Ashbery. The title comes from the nursery rhyme "Goosey Goosey Gander". It is Ashbery's 23rd book of poetry and was published through Ecco Press. It was a finalist for the National Book Award for Poetry.

== Reception ==
David Herd reviewed the book for The Guardian, and called it "a treat". Herd wrote: "The cast of characters is large, and their lives are sad and funny. ... What flow through the poems all the time, forming them and breaking them up, are the conflicting voices of 21st-century America: the cheering ones, the demoralised ones, the soulless ones, the coercive ones." The review ended: "The way Wordsworth courted nature, Ashbery courts life, cajoling it, snaring it, coaxing it into being. Where Shall I Wander is a bulletin, breaking news from the American present, to which Ashbery, again, is a humane and faithful guide." In Publishers Weekly, the book was compared to Ashbery's previous works: "This 23rd collection from Harold Bloom's favorite living American poet is a modestly scaled affair: it doesn't end with a grand long poem, which has become an Ashbery trademark since Rivers and Mountains, nor is it especially big like Can You Hear, Bird nor does it even contain many poems that extend more than three pages (the title poem, at seven pages, is the longest)." The critic wrote that what Ashbery accomplishes with the book, is that he provides the reader "with the experience of terrible encounter in the comfort of our own poem, one that we can choose to occupy for years, even after discovering the beating heart under the floorboards."

== See also ==
- 2005 in poetry
- American literature
