= The Skaters =

Poem by John Ashbery

- by John Ashbery
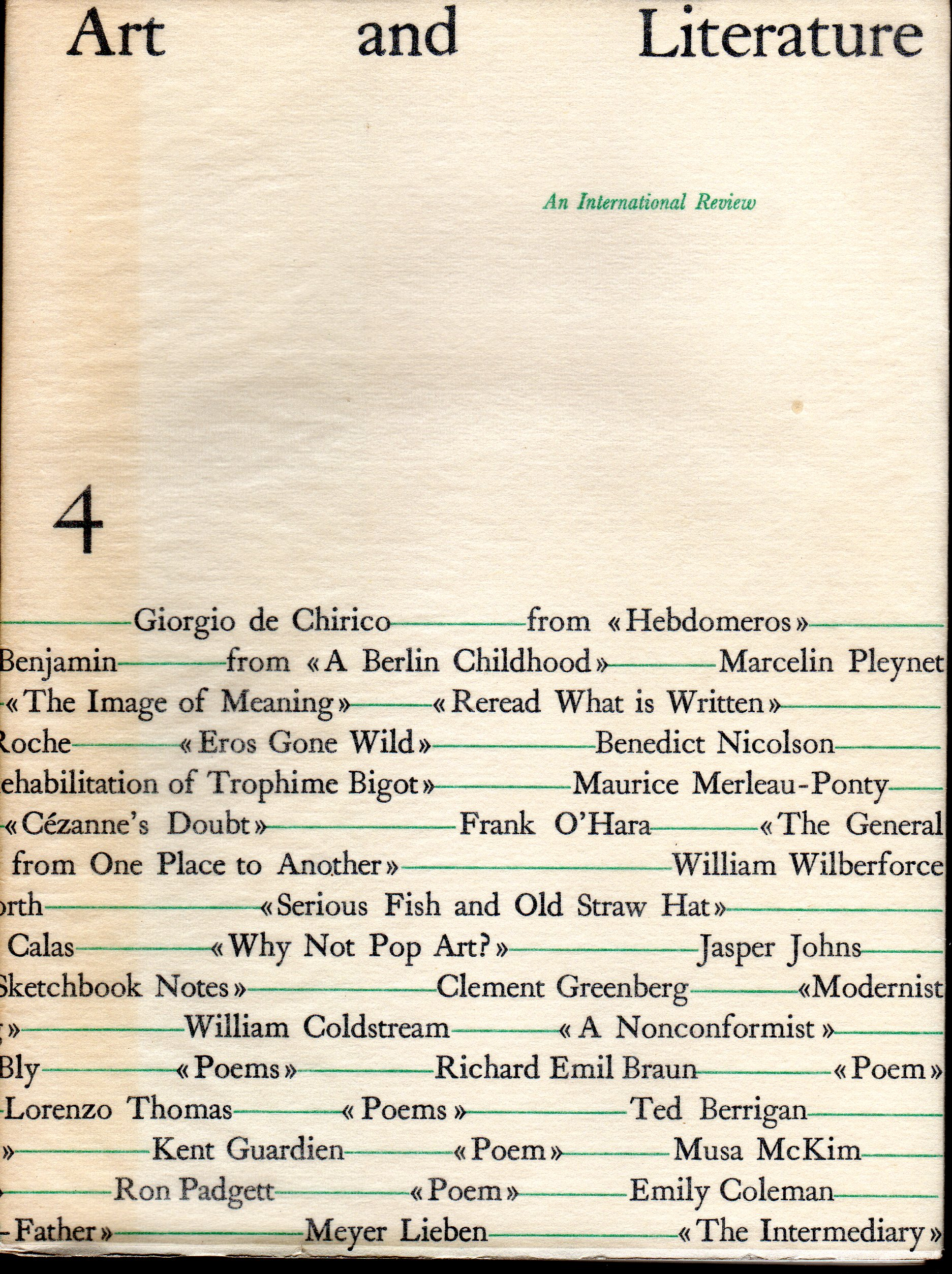
- Cover of Art and Literature (No. 4)
- First published in: Art and Literature (No. 4); Autumn–Winter 1964
- Country: United States
- Language: English
- Publisher: Published in the collection Rivers and Mountains by Holt, Rinehart and Winston
- Publication date: February 28, 1966

"The Skaters" is a 739-line long poem by American postmodern poet John Ashbery (b. 1927). Written from 1963 and in close to its final state in 1964, it was first published in Ashbery's fifth collection of poems, Rivers and Mountains published by Holt, Rinehart & Winston.

== Writing ==
According to an interview Ashbery gave to The Paris Review, he wrote the poem largely on typewriter.

when I was writing “The Skaters,” the lines became unmanageably long. I would forget the end of the line before I could get to it. It occurred to me that perhaps I should do this at the typewriter, because I can type faster than I can write. So I did, and that is mostly the way I have written ever since. Occasionally I write a poem in longhand to see whether I can still do it. I don't want to be forever bound to this machine.

Ashbery described the poem as "A meditation on my childhood which was rather solitary," and said that his childhood was not a painful experience but one of boredom. Ashbery felt that boredom was formative to his art, similar in vein to the statement of Larry Rivers to fellow New York School poet Frank O'Hara that "The history of art and the history of each artist’s development are the response to the discomforts of boredom."

It is thought by several critics that the title "The Skaters" refers to a passage in British poet William Wordsworth's autobiographical long poem The Prelude (1805), or possibly to a passage by American transcendentalist writer Henry David Thoreau in Walden.

== Critical reception ==
External audio
- "The Skaters" (47:53) – read by Ashbery at the Washington Square Art Gallery in New York City, August 23, 1964.

"The Skaters" is a puzzling poem that incorporates "techniques such as pastiche and moments of ars poetic meditation"—that is, a rhetorical technique in which the poem is a writing about writing, as in metalanguage—where "the text is a series of juxtapositions; it’s hard to know if the poem is even about skaters."

In analyzing "The Skaters", critic Brian McHale states that the poem "appears to make sense locally" but instead "one encounters an intractable flux of verbal 'found objects,' shifting styles and registers, teasing literary allusions and echoes, fragmentary narrative episodes and descriptive scenes."
