= Shannon Bramer =

Canadian poet

- Born: Shannon Dawn Marie Bramer; 4 October 1973; Hamilton, Ontario, Canada
- Occupations: Poet, teacher
- Writing career
- Period: 1999–present
- Notable awards: Hamilton and Region Arts Council Book Award; 1999
- Literary movement: New Ontarion

Shannon Bramer (born 4 October 1973) is a Canadian poet. Born in Hamilton, Ontario, she attended York University before publishing her first book, suitcases and other poems, which won the Hamilton and Region Arts Council Book Award. Over the next few years, she resided in Guelph, Ontario, where she helped found the Bookshelf Poetry Contest.

Settling in Toronto, Bramer published scarf in 2001, a book of poems which tells the story of Vera, a single woman working in a scarf store in Hamilton. scarf received praise from Canadian literary critics, perhaps exemplified by the Antigonish Review's comment that it is an "intriguing book about loneliness and searching". 2005 saw Bramer's first book of poems published by Coach House Books, The Refrigerator Memory. Incorporating a broad range of imagery, the poems in The Refrigerator Memory were also well received. Currently, Bramer lives in Toronto with her husband and two daughters. Her latest publication is the full-length collection of poetry, Precious Energy.

== Style ==
Bramer's poems are typically sparse in diction, and frequently "borrow from" and invent "fables and "fairy tales" - often surreal accounts of transpirations that occur on a day-to-day basis, as in "the psychology of a leaf" when she personifies leaves as if they were a human demographic. Her work differs significantly from both avant-garde Canadian poetry and more traditional, narrative poetry in that it is not pervasively influenced by either a particular school of experimentalism - Sound poetry, for example - or the Western literary canon. This is perhaps credible to her influences, which suggest a reliance more on oral tradition - the Mother Goose stories and rhymes being a good example, as they're transcriptions based on historically popular folk tales for children - than on conventional literary approaches.

Another significant attribute of Bramer's poetry is that it is tonally feminine, as well as less aurally harsh than the poetry of her Canadian predecessors including Bronwen Wallace and Margaret Atwood. This tendency toward gentle or playful phrasing runs in stark contrast with the themes addressed in her work (and, by extension, generates a tension essential to her writing), which is often related to women's issues; as in scarf, when she uses alternatively gamesome and somber, sometimes superficially constructed bad verse to tell the story of Vera, a woman in her late twenties who works in a scarf store and is both painfully shy and suffering from angst as result of her social circumstances. Bramer has stated before that her style is partly indebted to nineteenth-century women writers such as Emily Dickinson, and, perhaps, Charlotte Perkins Gilman.

Two literary ideologies that appear to inform Bramer's poetry are Surrealism and Imagism - the former in her tending towards surreal situations and lightness of tone (she has cited Charles Simic as a major influence), and the latter in her frequently imagistic verse, which often reflects Canadian poet Roo Borson's fixation on the image as a means to convey poetic content (though this approach is probably also influenced by Generation of '27 poets such as Federico García Lorca). Notably, Imagist poet Ezra Pound is alluded to ambiguously in her poem "Urban Restaurant", wherein he is fictitiously described as "Ezra, the new saucier."

== Works ==
=== Poetry, main collections ===
- suitcases and other poems (Exile Editions, 1999, ISBN 1-55096-542-5)
- scarf (McArthur & Co/Exile, 2001, ISBN 1-55096-634-0)
- The Refrigerator Memory (Coach House Press, 2005, ISBN 1-55245-154-2)
- Precious Energy (BookThug, 2017, ISBN 9781771663304)

=== Poetry, chapbooks ===
- poem(s) on the stairs (above/ground press, 2002, ISBN 1-894214-60-9)
- Fishings (BookThug, 2007, ISBN 978-1-897388-12-9)
- Be Mine (BookThug, 2010, ISBN 978-1-897388-64-8)
