= Auguries of Innocence (poetry collection) =

Book by Patti Smith

- Author: Patti Smith
- Cover artist: Patti Smith
- Language: English
- Genre: Poetry
- Publisher: Ecco Press
- Publication date: October 11, 2005
- Publication place: United States
- Media type: Hardcover, Paperback
- Pages: 80
- ISBN: 978-0-06-083266-7
- OCLC: 60375652
- Dewey Decimal: 811/.54 22
- LC Class: PS3569.M53787 A94 2005

Auguries of Innocence is a poetry collection by Patti Smith, published in 2005.

== Contents ==
1. "The Lovecrafter"
2. "Worthly The Lamb Slain For Us"
3. "Sleep Of The Dodo"
4. "The Long Road"
5. "A Phytagorean Traveler"
6. "Desert Chorus"
7. "Written By A Lake"
8. "The Oracle"
9. "The Setting And The Stone"
10. "The Mast Is Down"
11. "The Blue Doll"
12. "Eve Of All Saints"
13. "She Lay In The Stream Dreaming Of August Sander"
14. "Fourteen"
15. "Birds Of Iraq"
16. "Marigold"
17. "Tara"
18. "To His Daughter"
19. "The Pride Moves Slowly"
20. "The Leaves Are Late Falling"
21. "Wilderness"
22. "The Geometry Blinked Ruin Unimaginable"
23. "Fenomenico"
24. "Three Windows"
25. "Our Jargon Muffies The Drum
26. "Death Of A Tramp"
27. "Mummer Love"
28. "The Writer's Song"
