= Lola Haskins =

American poet

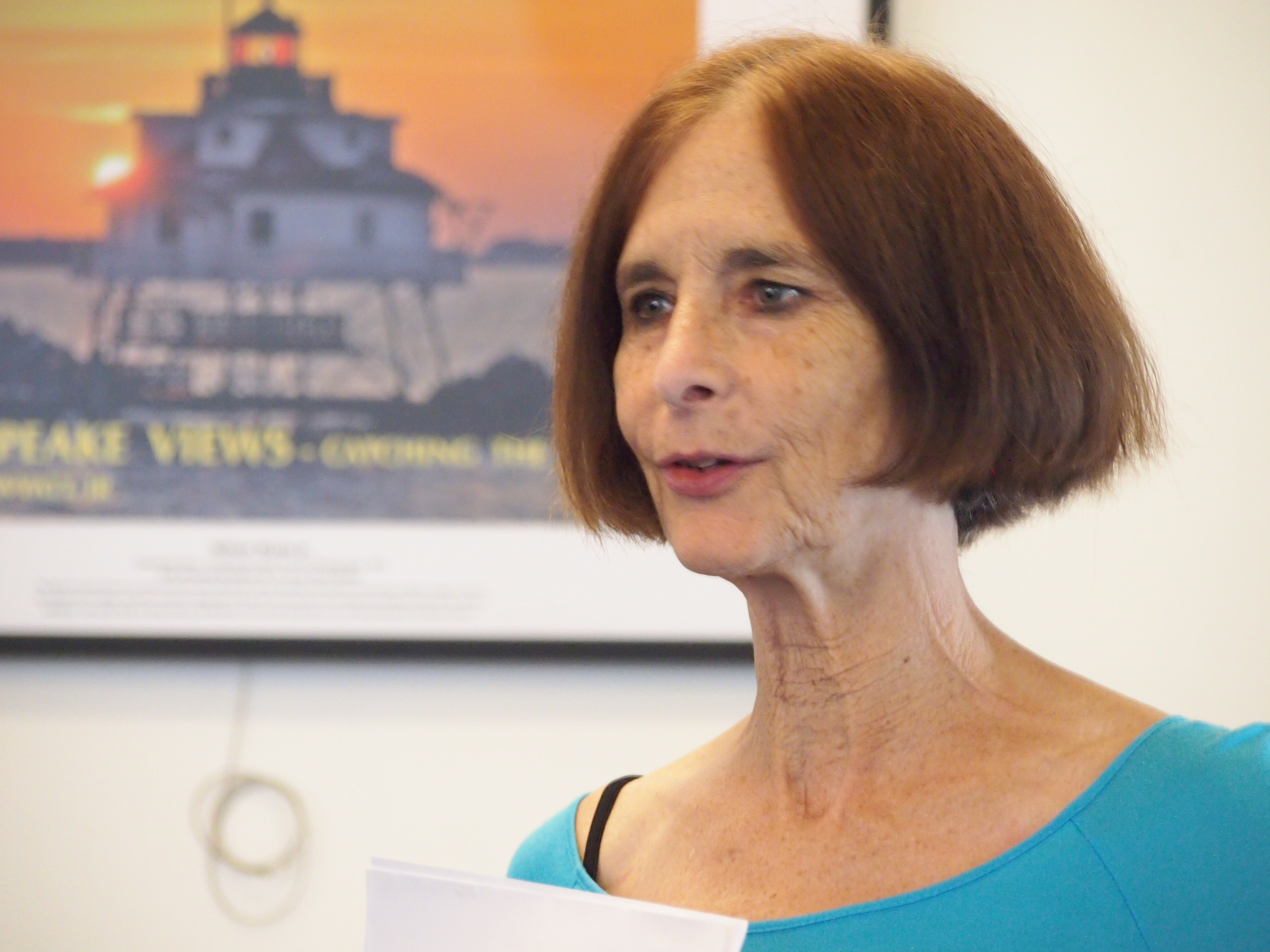
- Writing career
- Genre: Poetry

Lola Haskins is an American poet.

== Life ==
She was born in New York, and raised in northern California. Haskins has lived in San Francisco, Greece, and Mexico. She now divides her time between Northern England and North-Central Florida.

She has published fourteen books—the outliers being a poetry advice book, an exploration of fifteen Florida cemeteries, and a book of prose-poem fables about women, illustrated by Maggie Taylor.

Her work has appeared in The Atlantic, Beloit Poetry Journal, The Christian Science Monitor, Prairie Schooner, The Missouri Review, Mississippi Review, The London Review of Books, Georgia Review, Southern Review.

She taught computer science at the University of Florida for 28 years. Then, from 2004 until 2015, she was on the faculty of the Rainier Writer's Workshop, a low-residency MFA program based at Pacific Lutheran University.

== Awards ==
- two fellowships from the National Endowment for the Arts
- four individual artist fellowships from the state of Florida
- 1992 Iowa Poetry Prize, for Hunger
- Florida Book awards for Still, the Mountain and The Grace to Leave
- Writer Magazine/Emily Dickinson Award from the Poetry Society of America

== Works ==
- "Grandmother Speaks of the Old Country", Poetry Foundation
- "To Play Pianissimo", Poetry Foundation
- "from CASTINGS"; "from ACROSS HER BROAD LAP SOMETHING WONDERFUL"; "from FORTY-FOUR AMBITIONS FOR THE PIANO"; "from HUNGER"; "from THE RIM BENDERS", Adrondack Review, Fall 2005
- "Love Story", The Scream
- "Untitled"; "The Interpreters"; "Five from the Lake", Good Times Santa Cruz
- How Small, Confronting Morning, Jacar, 2016.
- The Grace to Leave, publisher=Anhinga year=2012 url=http://anhinga.org/books/book_info.cfm?title=Grace%20to%20Leave
- Fifteen Florida Cemeteries, Strange Tales Unearthed, publisher=University Press of Florida year=2011
- Still the Mountain publisher=Paper Kite Press year=2010 url=http://www.paperkitepress.com/shop.shtml
- Desire Lines, New and Selected Poems. BOA Editions. 2004. ISBN 978-1-929918-49-2.
- Extranjera. Story Line Press. 1998. ISBN 978-1-885266-57-6.
- The Rim Benders. Anhinga Press. 2001. ISBN 978-0-938078-70-8.
- Hunger. University of Iowa Press. 1993. ISBN 978-0-87745-424-3.
- Forty-Four Ambitions for the Piano. University of Central Florida Press. 1990. ISBN 978-0-8130-1003-8.
- Castings. Countryman Press. 1984. ISBN 978-0-88150-023-3.
- Planting the Children. University Press of Florida. December 1982. ISBN 978-0-8130-0727-4.
- Across Her Broad Lap Something Wonderful, State Street, 1990

=== Prose ===
- Not Feathers Yet: A Beginner's Guide to the Poetic Life. The Backwaters Press. 2007. ISBN 978-0-9785782-6-8.
- Solutions Beginning with A, fables about women. Illustrator Maggie Taylor. Modernbook. 2007.
- Fifteen Florida Cemeteries: Strange Tales Unearthed, University Press of Florida, 2011

=== Anthologies ===
- Ruth Lepson; Lynne Yamaguchi Fletcher, eds. (2004). "Message". Poetry from Sojourner: a feminist anthology. University of Illinois Press. ISBN 978-0-252-07154-6.

=== Ploughshares ===
- "Uchepas", Ploughshares, Winter 1993-94
- "Grass", Ploughshares, Spring 2002
