= Shanna Compton =

American poet

Shanna Compton is the author of Down Spooky, a collection of poems published by Winnow Press in October 2005, and the editor of GAMERS: Writers, Artists & Programmers on the Pleasures of Pixels, an anthology of essays on the theme of video games, published by Soft Skull Press in 2004. From 2002-2005, she served as the editor of Lit magazine at The New School in New York City, and has also edited several poetry collections and novels for Brooklyn, NY-based Soft Skull Press.

Compton has also curated multiple poetry reading series in New York City and currently runs a poetry micropress called Half Empty/Half Full. She maintains a frequently updated web site and poetry blog.

She was thanked for her suggestions by David Lehman, series editor of The Best American Poetry series in the acknowledgements sections of the 2003 and 2004 editions. A poem of hers was selected to appear in The Best American Poetry 2005.
