= Elena Karina Byrne =

American poet

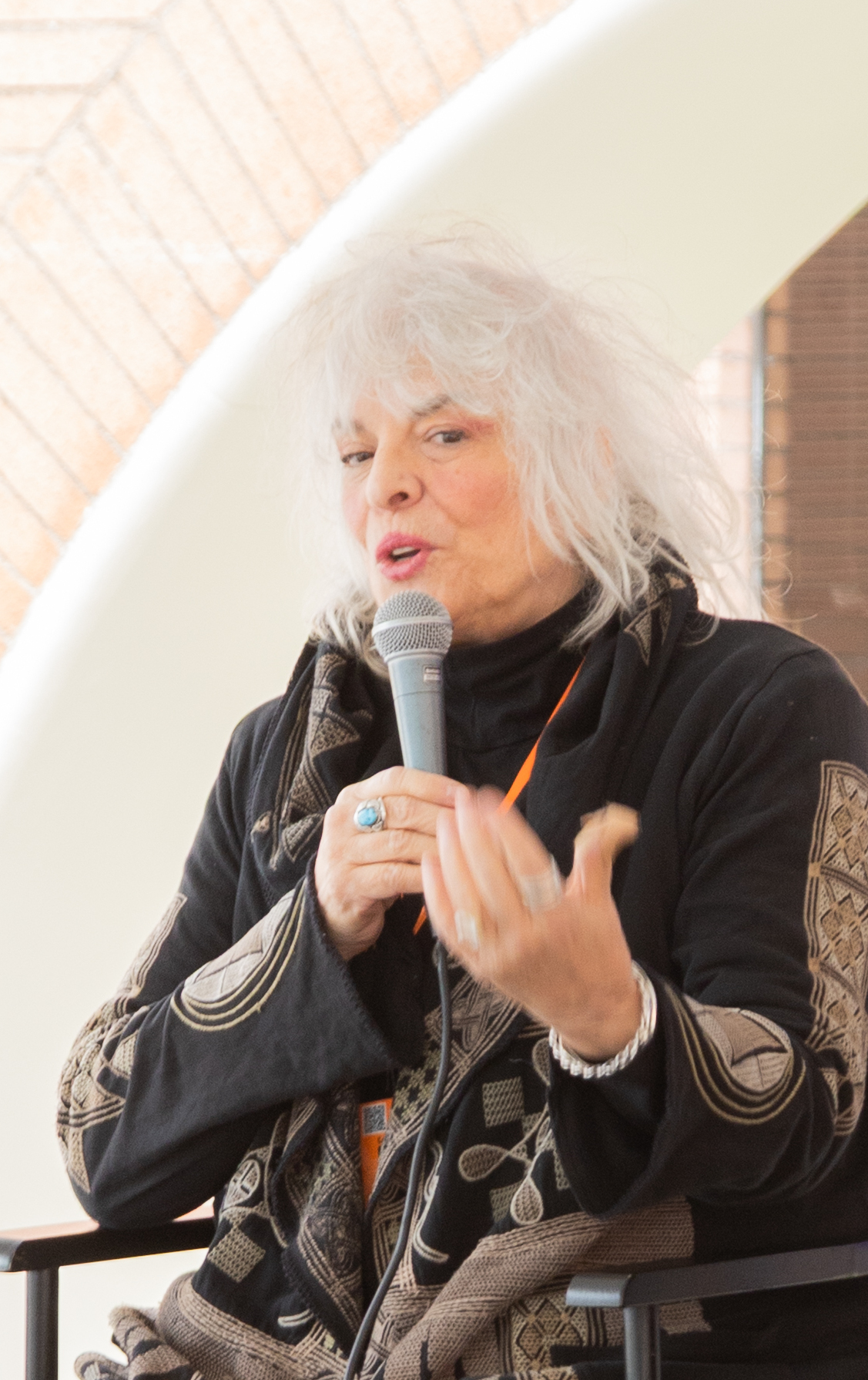
- Byrne in 2025
- Occupations: Poet; visual artist; teacher; editor
- Writing career
- Genre: poetry

Elena Karina Byrne is a poet, visual artist, teacher and editor. Her poem "Irregular Masks" was featured in The Best American Poetry 2005 and her poem "Berryman's Concordance Against This Silence" received a Pushcart Prize in 2008 for which she has been nominated eleven times.

She was a regional director of the Poetry Society of America for twelve years. Byrne has curated poetry readings at the Ruskin Art Club in Los Angeles, and at the Los Angeles Times Festival of Books. Her work has appeared in The Paris Review.

She is the daughter of American artist Herbert Jepson.

== Books ==
- The Flammable Bird Lincoln, Neb. : Zoo Press : 2002. ISBN 9780970817785, OCLC 50339320
- Masque Dorset, Vt. : Tupelo Press, 2008. ISBN 9781932195576, OCLC 156819050
- Squander, Richmond, California : Omnidawn Publishing, 2016. ISBN 9781632430229, OCLC 945648898
- The Fable Language (forthcoming)
- Voyeur Hour (forthcoming)
- Beautiful Insignificance (forthcoming)
