= Ruth Herschberger =

American poet (1917–2014)

- Born: January 30, 1917
- Died: October 14, 2014 (aged 97)
- Occupations: Poet, essayist, and feminist critic
- Writing career
- Notable work: Adam's Rib
- Notable awards: Hopwood Award for Poetry, Midland Authors Award for Poetry, Harriet Monroe Memorial Prize

Ruth Herschberger (January 30, 1917 – October 14, 2014) was an American poet, essayist, and feminist critic. She is best known for Adam's Rib (1948), a collection of essays examining cultural and scientific assumptions about gender roles, sexuality, and women's social position.

The book challenged the treatment of men's behaviour as a universal biological norm and criticised the use of scientific authority to naturalise stereotypes of masculine dominance and feminine passivity. It was republished in 1970 and was later recognised as an early contribution to feminist critiques of science and gender.

Herschberger was also a poet whose work appeared in Poetry, The Nation, Kenyon Review, and Partisan Review. She published two collections of poetry, A Way of Happening (1948) and Nature & Love Poems (1969), and received the Hopwood Award for Poetry, the Midland Authors Award for Poetry, and the Harriet Monroe Memorial Prize. She also received Rockefeller and Bollingen grants, the latter for translations of the Russian poet Vladimir Mayakovsky.

== Early life and education ==
Herschberger was born on January 30, 1917, in Philipse Manor, New York, and grew up in Chicago. She was the daughter of Clarence B. Herschberger and Grace Eberhart Herschberger.

She studied at the University of Chicago from 1935 to 1938 and at Black Mountain College in North Carolina from 1938 to 1939. She subsequently studied at the University of Michigan in 1941 and the New School for Social Research in New York from 1942 to 1943. She also took courses at Union Theological Seminary in New York.

== Adam’s Rib ==
Herschberger's best-known work, Adam's Rib, was published by Pellegrini & Cudahy in 1948 and republished by Harper and Row in 1970. The book comprises a series of essays on sexuality, science and women's social position, including "How to Tell a Woman from a Man", "Is Rape a Myth?" and "Society Writes Biology".

A recurring subject in the book is the influence of gender stereotypes on scientific descriptions of biological difference. Herschberger criticised representations of reproductive biology that characterised sperm as active and aggressive and the egg as passive. Her argument was later cited by anthropologist Emily Martin in "The Egg and the Sperm" (1991), an analysis of gender stereotypes in scientific accounts of human reproduction.

Herschberger also examined sexual violence. In "Is Rape a Myth?", she challenged the belief that men's sexual aggression was innate and examined the relationship between rape and cultural ideas of masculine aggression and feminine passivity. Later scholarship has identified Herschberger's essay as an early feminist interpretation of rape as violence rather than simply an expression of sexual desire.

Adam's Rib received significant press attention following its publication. It was reviewed in The New Yorker in March 1948, while coverage also appeared in the Chicago Sun, The New York Times, the New York Herald Tribune, the San Francisco Chronicle and The Saturday Review.

== Feminist thought and legacy ==
Although Adam's Rib appeared more than a decade before the emergence of second-wave feminism in the United States, Herschberger's arguments were subsequently taken up by feminist writers and scholars concerned with sexual violence, biological essentialism and the relationship between science and gender. Susan Brownmiller, author of Against Our Will (1975), later recalled reading Adam's Rib while writing her own study of rape and singled out "Is Rape a Myth?" as an important earlier analysis.

Herschberger's work has also been discussed in transgender studies in relation to the history of feminist understandings of biological sex. An entry in The SAGE Encyclopedia of Trans Studies identifies Herschberger as an early critic of binary conceptions of sex, arguing that in 1948 she "attacked the very notion of a discrete body binary" and described sexed bodily attributes as existing on a spectrum rather than appearing in two discrete sets. The same account places Herschberger's work within an early social-constructionist tradition that subsequently informed feminist challenges to the idea of a natural and unchanging binary division between 'male' and 'female' bodies.

Similarly, Shira Tarrant devotes a chapter of When Sex Became Gender (2006) to Herschberger and argues that postwar writers including Herschberger contributed to an intellectual shift away from treating gendered characteristics as straightforward consequences of biological sex. Sociologist Mary Jo Deegan similarly described Herschberger as a social constructionist whose work addressed gender ideology in biological science and language.

Herschberger's critique of gendered accounts of biology also entered later feminist science studies. Biologist Anne Fausto-Sterling cited Adam's Rib in her 1987 essay "Society Writes Biology / Biology Constructs Gender", which examined the relationship between cultural understandings of gender and scientific accounts of biological sex. Emily Martin subsequently cited Herschberger's discussion of reproductive biology in her 1991 analysis of the metaphors used to describe eggs and sperm.

Her work has also appeared in later queer discussions of biological sex and sexuality, including scholarship concerned with "queering" the teaching of biological science. Her essay "Josie Takes the Stand" has been anthologised in the Feminist Theory Reader, which places Herschberger's work alongside later writing on sexuality, queer theory and transgender experience.

More recently, psychoanalyst Darian Leader discussed Herschberger at length in Is It Ever Just Sex? (2023), describing Adam's Rib as "arguably the single most significant work of the twentieth century on women's subjectivities and gender".

Leader draws on Herschberger in developing a psychoanalytic critique of attempts to reduce sexuality to biological function or fixed categories of male and female desire, placing her arguments in dialogue with understandings of sexuality as heterogeneous and resistant to straightforward classification. In Leader's account, Herschberger's work similarly challenges straightforward correspondences between anatomical sex, gender, desire, and sexual experience.

Adam's Rib was reissued by Routledge in 2026 as part of its Routledge Revivals series.
