= Marlys West =

American poet and writer

Marlys West is an American poet and writer. She received her MFA from the James A. Michener Center for Writers at the University of Texas at Austin, and was a Hodder Fellow at Princeton University. She also received a grant from the National Endowment for the Arts. Her first book of poems titled Notes for a Late-Blooming Martyr was published by the University of Akron Press. She has had work published in many literary journals and magazines; her work has also appeared in the anthology series The Best American Poetry.
