= John Ashbery =

American poet (1927–2017)

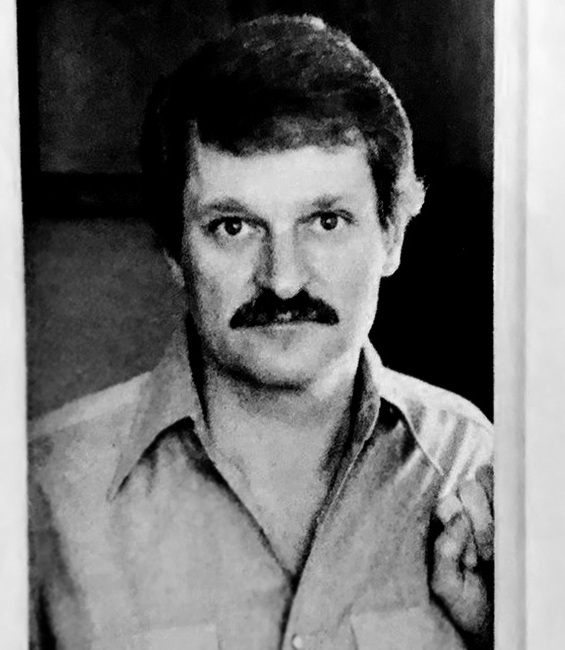
- Ashbery in 1975
- Born: John Lawrence Ashbery; July 28, 1927; Rochester, New York, U.S.
- Died: September 3, 2017 (aged 90); Hudson, New York, U.S.
- Education: Harvard University (BA); New York University; Columbia University (MA)
- Occupations: Poet, professor, and art critic
- Spouse: David Kermani
- Writing career
- Period: 1949–2017
- Notable work: Self-Portrait in a Convex Mirror
- Notable awards: MacArthur Fellowship, Pulitzer Prize for Poetry, National Book Award, National Book Critics Circle Award, Guggenheim Fellowship
- Movements: Surrealism, The New York School, Postmodernism

John Lawrence Ashbery (July 28, 1927 – September 3, 2017) was an American poet and art critic.

Ashbery is considered the most influential American poet of his time. Oxford University literary critic John Bayley wrote that Ashbery "sounded, in poetry, the standard tones of the age." Langdon Hammer, chair of the English Department at Yale University, wrote in 2008, "No figure looms so large in American poetry over the past 50 years as John Ashbery" and "No American poet has had a larger, more diverse vocabulary, not Whitman, not Pound." Stephanie Burt, a poet and Harvard professor of English, has compared Ashbery to T. S. Eliot, calling Ashbery "the last figure whom half the English-language poets alive thought a great model, and the other half thought incomprehensible".

Ashbery published more than 20 volumes of poetry. Among other awards, he received the Pulitzer Prize for Poetry, National Book Award, and National Book Critics Circle Award for his collection Self-Portrait in a Convex Mirror (1975). In 2007, he became the first living poet to be anthologized by the Library of America. Renowned for its postmodern complexity and opacity, his work still proves controversial. Ashbery said he wished his work to be accessible to as many people as possible, not a private dialogue with himself. He also joked that some critics still view him as "a harebrained, homegrown surrealist whose poetry defies even the rules and logic of Surrealism." He reflected: "I’m not very good at explaining my work... I'm unable to do so because I feel that my poetry is the explanation. The explanation of what? Of my thought, whatever that is. As I see it, my thought is both poetry and the attempt to explain that poetry; the two cannot be disentangled."

== Life ==
Ashbery was born in Rochester, New York, the son of Helen (née Lawrence), a biology teacher, and Chester Frederick Ashbery, a farmer. He was raised on a farm near Lake Ontario; his brother died when they were children. Ashbery was educated at Deerfield Academy, an all-boys school, where he read such poets as W. H. Auden and Dylan Thomas and began writing poetry. Two of his poems were published in Poetry magazine by a classmate who had submitted them under his own name, without Ashbery's knowledge or permission. Ashbery also published a piece of short fiction and a handful of poems—including a sonnet about his frustrated love for a fellow student—in the school newspaper, the Deerfield Scroll. His first ambition was to be a painter: from the age of 11 until he was 15, Ashbery took weekly classes at the art museum in Rochester.

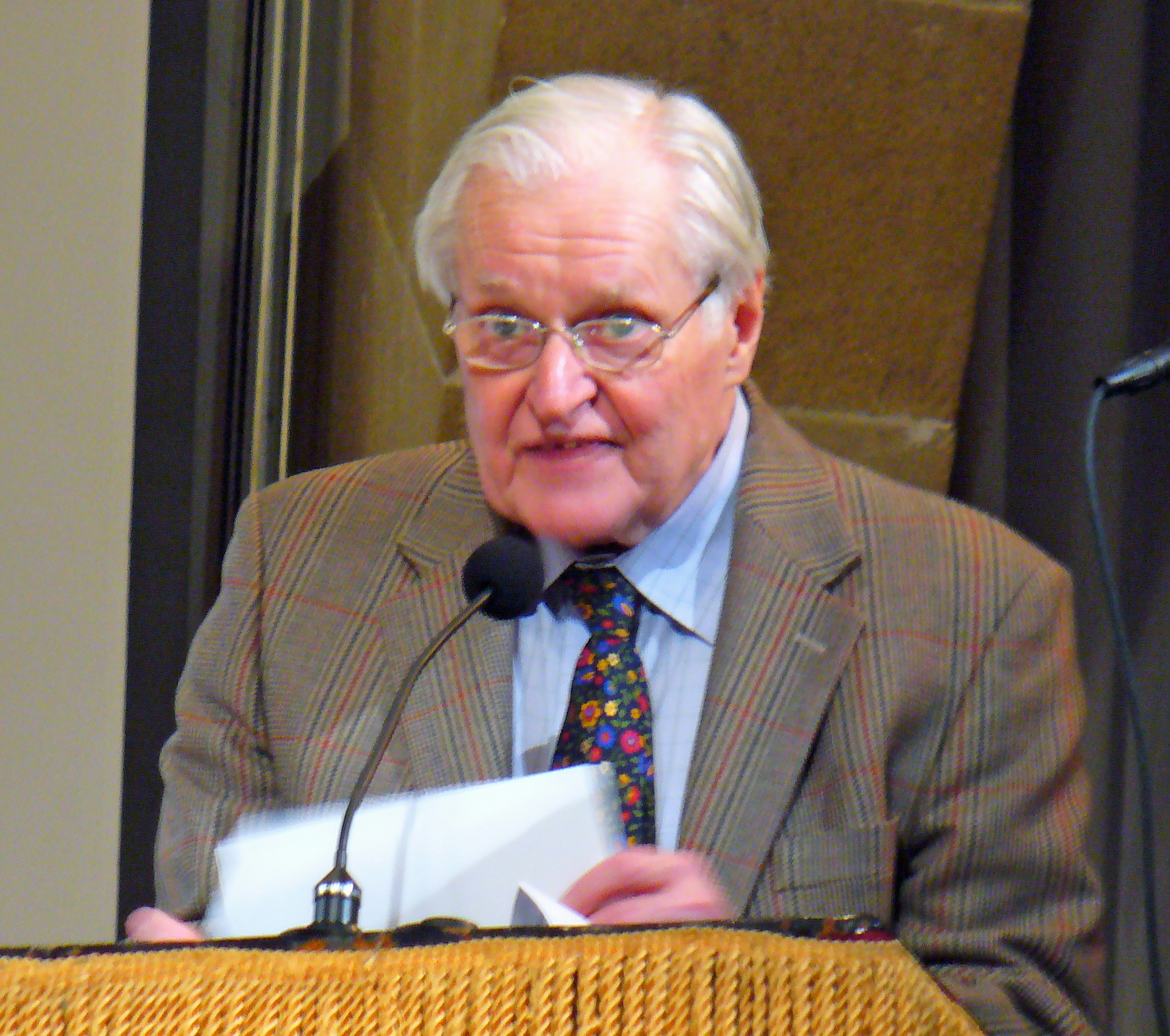
Ashbery at a 2007 tribute to W. H. Auden at Cooper Union in New York City

Ashbery graduated in 1949 with an A.B., cum laude, from Harvard College, where he was a member of the Harvard Advocate, the university's literary magazine, and the Signet Society. He wrote his senior thesis on the poetry of W. H. Auden. At Harvard he befriended fellow writers Kenneth Koch, Barbara Epstein, V. R. Lang, Frank O'Hara and Edward Gorey, and was a classmate of Robert Creeley, Robert Bly and Peter Davison. Ashbery went on to study briefly at New York University before receiving an M.A. from Columbia University in 1951.

After working as a copywriter in New York from 1951 to 1955, from the mid-1950s, when he received a Fulbright Fellowship, through 1965, Ashbery lived in France. He was an editor of the 12 issues of Art and Literature (1964–67) and the New Poetry issue of Harry Mathews' Locus Solus (# 3/4; 1962). To make ends meet he translated French murder mysteries, served as the art editor for the European edition of the New York Herald Tribune, was an art critic for Art International (1960–65), and a Paris correspondent for ARTnews (1963–66), when Thomas Hess took over as editor. In 1958, he was recruited by Jeanne Unger at Grove Press to translate Jean-Jacques Mayoux's Melville par lui-même as Melville (1960). During this period he lived with the French poet Pierre Martory, whose books Every Question but One (1990), The Landscape is behind the Door (1994), and The Landscapist he translated (2008), as he did Arthur Rimbaud (Illuminations), Max Jacob (The Dice Cup), Pierre Reverdy (Haunted House), and many titles by Raymond Roussel. After returning to the United States, he continued his career as an art critic for New York and Newsweek magazines while also serving on the editorial board of ARTnews until 1972. Several years later, he began a stint as an editor at Partisan Review, serving from 1976 to 1980.

During the fall of 1963, Ashbery became acquainted with Andy Warhol at a scheduled poetry reading at the Literary Theatre in New York. He had previously written favorable reviews of Warhol's art. That same year he reviewed Warhol's Flowers exhibition at Galerie Ileana Sonnabend in Paris, describing Warhol's visit to Paris as "the biggest transatlantic fuss since Oscar Wilde brought culture to Buffalo in the nineties". Ashbery returned to New York near the end of 1965 and was welcomed with a large party at the Factory. He became close friends with poet Gerard Malanga, Warhol's assistant, on whom he had an important influence as a poet. In 1967 his poem "Europe" was used as the central text in Eric Salzman's Foxes and Hedgehogs as part of the New Image of Sound series at Hunter College, conducted by Dennis Russell Davies. When the poet sent Salzman Three Madrigals in 1968, the composer featured them in the seminal Nude Paper Sermon, released by Nonesuch Records in 1989.

In the early 1970s, Ashbery began teaching at Brooklyn College, where his students included poet John Yau. He was elected a Fellow of the American Academy of Arts and Sciences in 1983. In the 1980s, he moved to Bard College, where he was the Charles P. Stevenson, Jr., Professor of Languages and Literature, until 2008, when he retired but continued to win awards, present readings, and work with graduate and undergraduates at many other institutions. He was the poet laureate of New York State from 2001 to 2003, and also served for many years as a chancellor of the Academy of American Poets. He served on the contributing editorial board of the literary journal Conjunctions. In 2008 Ashbery was named the first poet laureate of MtvU, a division of MTV broadcast to U.S. college campuses, with excerpts from his poems featured in 18 promotional spots and the works in their entirety on the broadcaster's website.

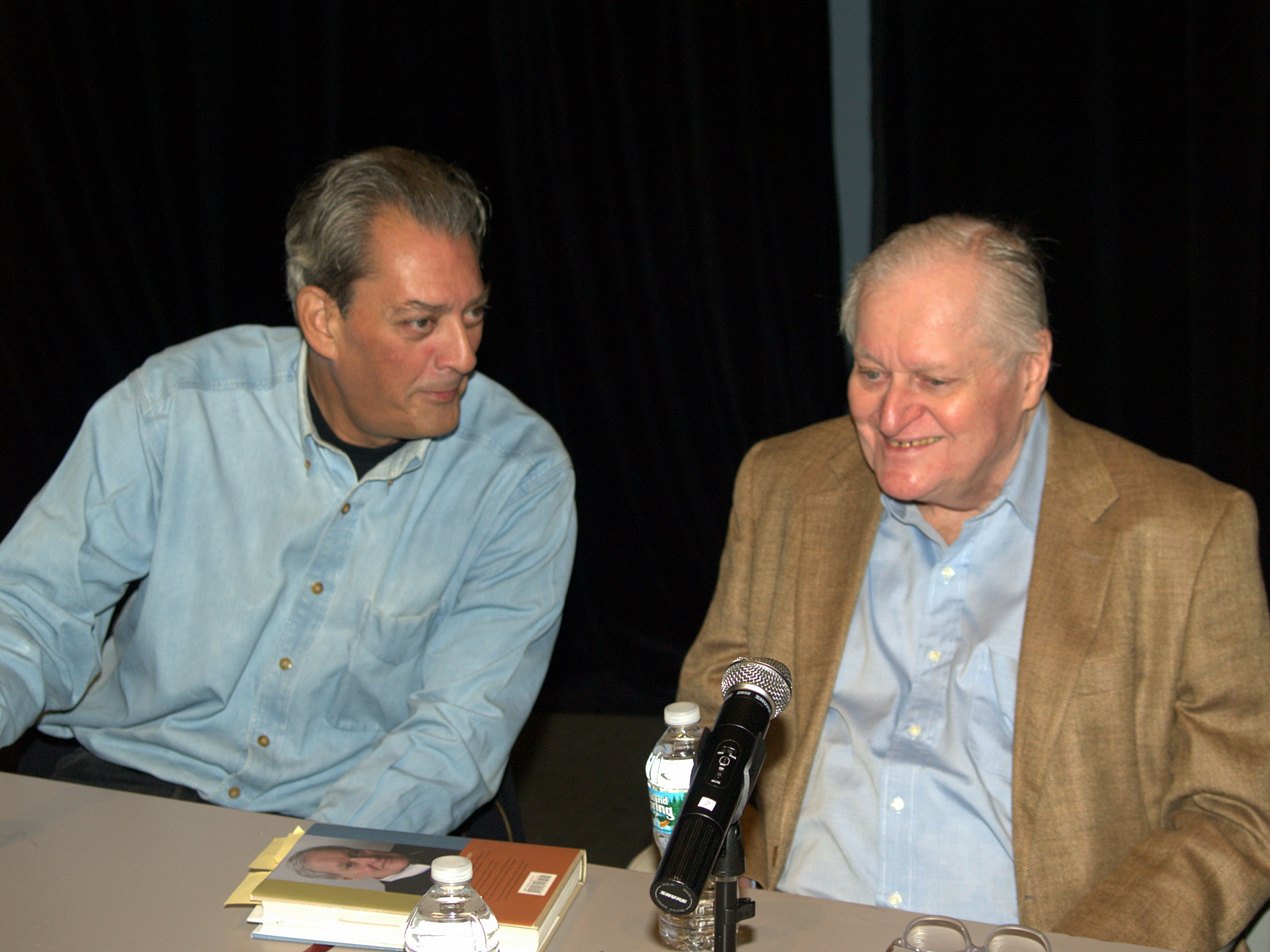
Paul Auster and Ashbery discussing their work at the 2010 Brooklyn Book Festival

Ashbery was a Millet Writing Fellow at Wesleyan University in 2010, and participated in Wesleyan's Distinguished Writers Series. He was a founding member of The Raymond Roussel Society, with Miquel Barceló, Joan Bofill-Amargós, Michel Butor, Thor Halvorssen and Hermes Salceda.

Ashbery lived in New York City and Hudson, New York, with his husband, David Kermani. He died of natural causes on September 3, 2017, at his home in Hudson, at the age of 90.

== Work ==
Ashbery's long list of awards began with the Yale Younger Poets Prize in 1956. The selection, by W. H. Auden, of Ashbery's first collection, Some Trees, later caused some controversy. The volume was screened out in the contest's early stages and was given to Auden by Chester Kallman after Auden had decided not to award the prize that year because of the poor quality of the volumes he received. Ashbery's early work shows the influence of Auden, along with Wallace Stevens, Boris Pasternak, and many of the French surrealists (his translations from French literature are numerous), though he claimed in a 1956 letter to "hate all modern French poetry, except for Raymond Roussel" and to like his own "wildly inaccurate translations of some of the 20th-century ones, but not the originals".

In the late 1950s, John Bernard Myers, co-owner of the Tibor de Nagy Gallery, categorized Ashbery's avant-garde poetry and that of Kenneth Koch, Frank O'Hara, James Schuyler, Barbara Guest, Kenward Elmslie and others as a "New York School", despite their very different styles. In 1953 Myers launched the magazine Semi-Colon, in which New York School poets appeared amid an eclectic mix of authors, such as Auden, James Merrill and Saul Bellow.

Ashbery published some work in the avant-garde little magazine Nomad at the beginning of the 1960s. He then wrote two collections while in France, the highly controversial The Tennis Court Oath (1962) and Rivers and Mountains (1966), before returning to New York to write The Double Dream of Spring, published in 1970.

Increasing critical recognition in the 1970s transformed Ashbery from an obscure avant-garde experimentalist into one of America's most important poets (though still one of its most controversial). After the publication of Three Poems (1973) came Self-Portrait in a Convex Mirror, for which he was awarded the three major American poetry awards: the Pulitzer Prize, the National Book Award, and the National Book Critics Circle Award. The collection's title poem is considered one of the masterpieces of late 20th century American poetic literature.

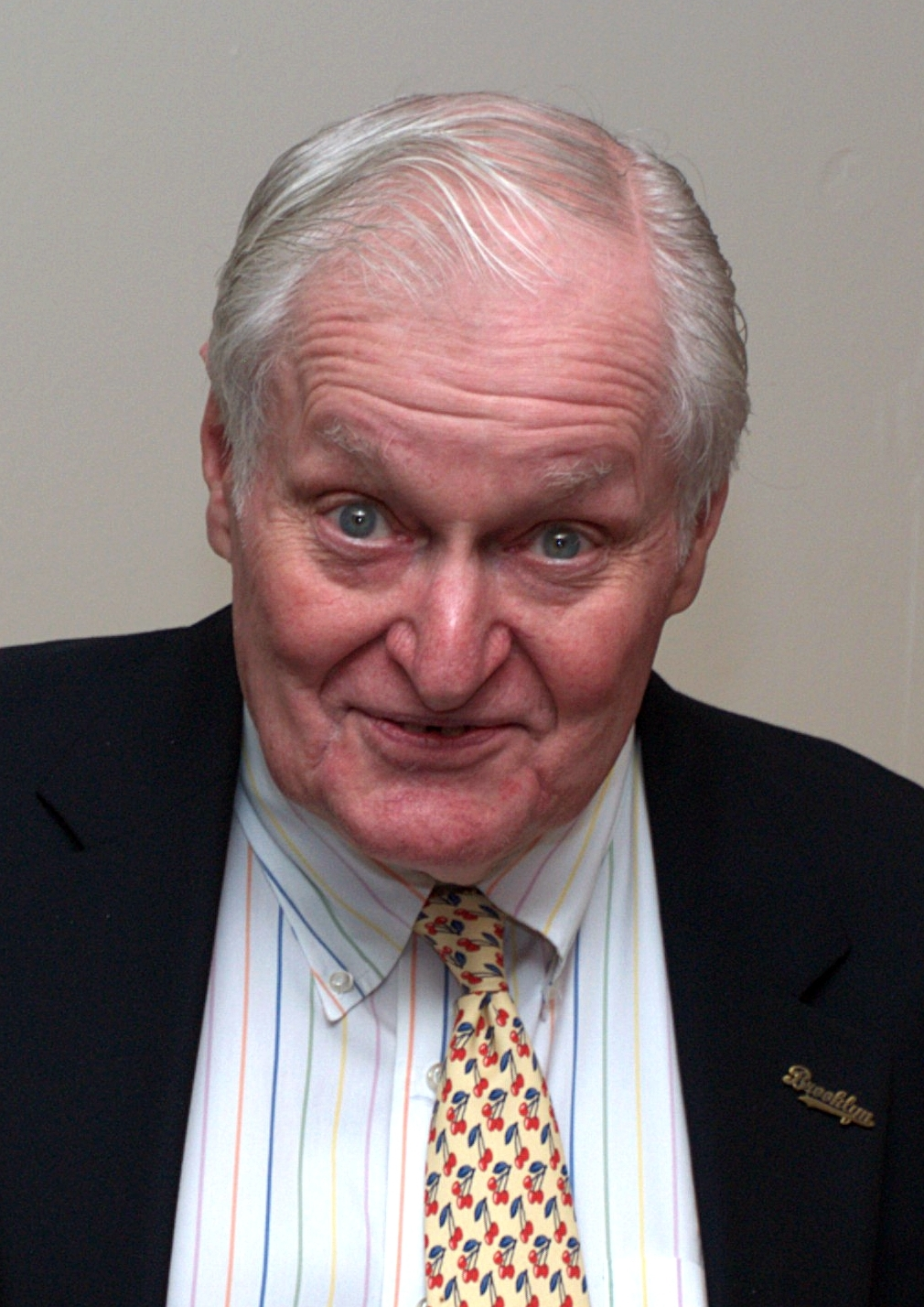
Ashbery in 2010

His subsequent collection, the more difficult Houseboat Days (1977), reinforced Ashbery's reputation, as did 1979's As We Know, which contains the long, double-columned poem "Litany". In 1988, his "Bridge Poem" was installed, using metal letters, on the 375-foot-wide Irene Hixon Whitney Bridge in Minneapolis; the poet was selected by the bridge's architect, artist Siah Armajani, and commissioned by the Walker Art Center. By the 1980s and 1990s, Ashbery had become a central figure in American and more broadly English-language poetry, as his number of imitators attested.

Ashbery's works are characterized by a free-flowing, often disjunctive syntax; extensive linguistic play, often infused with considerable humor; and a prosaic, sometimes disarmingly flat or parodic tone. The play of the human mind is the subject of a great many of his poems. He once said that his goal was "to produce a poem that the critic cannot even talk about". Formally, the earliest poems show the influence of conventional poetic practice, yet by The Tennis Court Oath a much more revolutionary engagement with form appears. Ashbery returned to something approaching a reconciliation between tradition and innovation with many of the poems in The Double Dream of Spring, though his Three Poems are written in long blocks of prose. Although he never again approached the radical experimentation of The Tennis Court Oath poems or "The Skaters" and "Into the Dusk-Charged Air" from his collection Rivers and Mountains, syntactic and semantic experimentation, linguistic expressiveness, deft, often abrupt shifts of register, and insistent wit remained consistent elements of his work.

Ashbery's art criticism has been collected in the 1989 volume Reported Sightings, Art Chronicles 1957–1987, edited by the poet David Bergman. He wrote one novel, A Nest of Ninnies, with fellow poet James Schuyler, and in his 20s and 30s penned several plays, three of which have been collected in Three Plays (1978). Ashbery's Charles Eliot Norton Lectures at Harvard University were published as Other Traditions in 2000. A larger collection of his prose writings, Selected Prose, appeared in 2005. In 2008, his Collected Poems 1956–1987 was published as part of the Library of America series. This made Ashbery the first living poet to have his work published by the LOA.

== Awards and honors ==
- 1956: Yale Younger Poets Prize, for Some Trees (1956) awarded by W.H. Auden
- 1962: Ingram Merrill Foundation Fellowship
- 1972: Ingram Merrill Foundation Fellowship
- 1976: National Book Award for Self-Portrait in a Convex Mirror (1975).
- 1976: National Book Critics Circle Award for Self-Portrait in a Convex Mirror (1975).
- 1976: Pulitzer Prize in Poetry for Self-Portrait in a Convex Mirror (1975).
- 1984: Lenore Marshall Poetry Prize for A Wave (1984)
- 1984: Bollingen Prize in Poetry for A Wave (1984)
- 1985: MacArthur Fellows Program Fellowship
- 1987: Golden Plate Award of the American Academy of Achievement
- 1995: Robert Frost Medal
- 2002: Bestowed the rank of Officier de la Légion d'honneur by the Republic of France.
- 2005: finalist for National Book Award for Where Shall I Wander (2005)
- 2008: Robert Creeley Award
- 2008: America Award for a lifetime contribution to international writing
- 2011 National Humanities Medal
- 2011: Inducted into the New York Writers Hall of Fame
- 2011: National Book Foundation Medal for Distinguished Contribution to American Letters
- 2017: The Raymond Roussel Society Medal

== Selected works ==
=== Poetry ===
==== Collections ====
- Turandot and other poems (1953)
- Some Trees (1956), winner of the 1955 Yale Series of Younger Poets
- The Tennis Court Oath (1962)
- Rivers and Mountains (1966)
- The Double Dream of Spring (1970)
- Three Poems (1972)
- The Vermont Notebook (1975), illustrated prose poems
- Self-Portrait in a Convex Mirror (1975), awarded the Pulitzer Prize, the National Book Award and the National Book Critics Circle Award
- Houseboat Days (1977)
- As We Know (1979)
- Shadow Train (1981)
- A Wave (1984), awarded the Lenore Marshall Poetry Prize and the Bollingen Prize
- April Galleons (1987)
- Flow Chart (1991), book-length poem
- Hotel Lautréamont (1992)
- And the Stars Were Shining (1994)
- Can You Hear, Bird? (1995)
- The Mooring of Starting Out: The First Five Books of Poetry (1997)
- Wakefulness (1998)
- Girls on the Run (1999), a book-length poem inspired by the work of Henry Darger
- Your Name Here (2000)
- As Umbrellas Follow Rain (2001)
- Chinese Whispers (2002)
- Where Shall I Wander (2005) (finalist for the National Book Award)
- Notes from the Air: Selected Later Poems (2007) (winner of the 2008 International Griffin Poetry Prize)
- A Worldly Country (2007)
- Planisphere (2009)
- Collected Poems 1956–87 (Carcanet Press) (2010), ed. Mark Ford
- Quick Question (2012)
- Breezeway (2015)
- Commotion of the Birds (2016)
- They Knew What They Wanted: Collages and Poems (2018)
- Parallel Movement of the Hands: Five Unfinished Longer Works (2021)

==== Poems ====
Title	Year	First published	Reprinted/collected in
East February	2014	Ashbery, John (March 24, 2014). "East February". The New Yorker. Vol. 90, no. 5. p. 78.	
At North Farm	1984		

=== Prose, plays and translations ===
- A Nest of Ninnies (1969), with James Schuyler. (Carcanet Press 1987, Paladin Books 1990)
- Three Plays (1978). Carcanet Press (1988).
- Mayoux, Jean-Jacques (1960). Melville. Trans. by John Ashbery. New York, Grove Press.
- The Ice Storm (1987), (32-page pamphlet)
- Reported Sightings: Art Chronicles, 1957–1987 (1989) (Alfred A. Knopf), ed. David Bergman, Art Criticism and Commentary
- Other Traditions(2001)Subjects and Series | Harvard University Press
- 100 Multiple-Choice Questions (2000) (reprint of 1970 experimental pamphlet)
- Selected Prose 1953–2003 (2005)
- Martory, Pierre The Landscapist Ashbery (Tr.) Carcanet Press (2008)
- Rimbaud, Arthur Illuminations Ashbery (Tr.) W. W. Norton & Company (2011)
- Collected French Translations: Poetry, edited by Rosanne Wasserman and Eugene Richie (2014)
- Collected French Translations: Prose, edited by Rosanne Wasserman and Eugene Richie (2014)
