= James Richardson (poet) =

American poet (born 1950)

- Born: January 1, 1950 (age 75); Garden City, New York, USA
- Occupation: Poet and critic
- Period: 1977–present

James Richardson (born January 1, 1950) is an American poet.

== Career and education ==
James Richardson is an American poet and critic. He is a retired Professor of English & Creative Writing at Princeton University, where he had taught since 1980. He grew up in Garden City, New York and attended Princeton University, graduating summa cum laude in 1971. He earned his Ph.D. from the University of Virginia in 1975.

Richardson is the author of several collections of poetry, criticism, and aphorisms, and has been awarded or nominated for some of the top awards in American literature, including the Jackson Poetry Prize, the National Book Award, and the National Book Critics Circle Award.

His work has appeared in multiple editions of The Best American Poetry, and in publications including The New Yorker, Paris Review, and Slate.

== Awards ==
- Award in Literature from the American Academy of Arts and Letters
- Robert H. Winner Award, Poetry Society of America
- Cecil Hemley Award, Poetry Society of America
- Emily Dickinson Award, Poetry Society of America
- NEH Fellowship
- New Jersey State Council on the Arts Fellowship
- 1991 National Poetry Series
- National Book Critics Circle Award finalist, for Interglacial: New and Selected Poems and Aphorisms
- 2010 National Book Award finalist for By the Numbers
- 2011 Jackson Poetry Prize (awarded by Poets & Writers)

== Bibliography ==
=== Poetry ===
Collections

- Richardson, James (1977). Reservations. Princeton UP.
- — (1984). Second guesses. Wesleyan.
- As If. Persea Books. April 1992. ISBN 978-0-89255-171-2.
- How Things Are. Carnegie Mellon University Press. 2000. ISBN 978-0-88748-327-1.
- Interglacial: New and Selected Poems and Aphorisms. Ausable Press. 2004. ISBN 978-1-931337-21-2.
- By The Numbers. Copper Canyon Press. 2010. ISBN 978-1-55659-320-8.
- During. Copper Canyon Press. 2016. ISBN 978-1-55659-433-5.

List of poems

Title	Year	First published	Reprinted/collected
Essay on clouds	2015	Richardson, James (February 2, 2015). "Essay on clouds". The New Yorker. Vol. 90, no. 46. pp. 42–43.	
How I became a saint	2016	Richardson, James (August 8–15, 2016). "How I became a saint". The New Yorker. Vol. 92, no. 24. p. 47.	

=== Aphorisms ===
- Richardson, James (2001). Vectors: Aphorisms and Ten-Second Essays. Ausable Press. ISBN 9780967266886. "James Richardson (poet) vectors."
- — (2013). "Vectors 3.1 : aphorisms and ten second essays". In Henderson, Bill (ed.). The Pushcart Prize XXXVII : best of the small presses 2013. Pushcart Press. pp. 542–546.

=== Criticism ===
- Richardson, James (1977). Thomas Hardy : The Poetry of Necessity. University of Chicago Press. ISBN 978-0-226-71237-6.
- — (1988). Vanishing Lives : Tennyson, Rossetti, Swinburne and Yeats. University of Virginia Press. ISBN 978-0-8139-1165-6.

=== Appearances in anthologies ===
- Best American Poetry 2001. Simon and Schuster. 2001. ISBN 978-0-7432-0384-5.
- Paul Muldoon; David Lehman, eds. (2005). "All the Ghosts". The Best American Poetry 2005. Simon and Schuster. ISBN 978-0-7432-5758-9.
- Harold Bloom; Jesse Zuba, eds. (2006). American religious poems: an anthology. Library of America. ISBN 978-1-931082-74-7.
- David Lehman, ed. (2003). Great American prose poems: from Poe to the present. Scribner Poetry. ISBN 978-0-7432-2989-0.
- James Geary (2007). Geary's Guide to the World's Great Aphorists. Bloomsbury USA. ISBN 978-1-59691-252-6.
