= Jason Schneiderman =

American poet (born 1976)

- Born: 1976 (age 49–50)
- Education: University of Maryland, College Park (BA); New York University (MFA); CUNY Graduate Center (PhD)
- Occupation: Poet
- Writing career
- Notable awards: Writer Magazine/Emily Dickinson Award (2004)
- Website: jasonschneiderman.net

Jason Schneiderman (born 1976) is an American poet.

== Life ==
Jason Schneiderman has BA degrees in English and Russian from the University of Maryland, an MFA in poetry from NYU, and a Ph.D. in English Literature with a focus on Queer Theory from the Graduate Center, CUNY. He is a tenured professor at Borough of Manhattan Community College, and has taught in the MFA Program for Writers at Warren Wilson College. He was a featured faculty member at the 2018 Conference on Poetry at The Frost Place.

He is one of the hosts of Painted Bride Quarterly Slush Pile, a podcast that puts an editorial meeting on the air.

He is one of the hosts of Monday Night Poetry at KGB Bar, a longstanding reading series in New York City.

Schneiderman's essays on teaching formal poetry have appeared in Teachers and Writers. His essays on poetry have frequently appeared in American Poetry Review. The anthology Queer: A Reader for Writers was the first Freshman composition reader focused on LGBTIAQ topics.

== Books ==
- Nothingism: Poetry at the End of Print Culture. University of Michigan Press. 2025 ISBN 978-0472039845
- Self Portrait of Icarus as a Country on Fire. Red Hen Press. 2024. ISBN 978-1-63628-162-9.
- Hold Me Tight. Red Hen Press. 2020. ISBN 978-1-59709-829-8.
- Primary Source. Red Hen Press. 2016. ISBN 978-1-59709-743-7.
- Queer: A Reader for Writers. Oxford University Press. 2015. Link
- Striking Surface. Ashland Poetry Press. 2010. ISBN 978-0-912592-70-1.
- Sublimation Point. Four Way Books. 2004. ISBN 978-1-884800-61-0.

== Awards ==
- 2026 Pegasus Award for Poetry Criticism for Nothingism: Poetry at the End of Print Culture
- Fulbright Fellow, Spring 2022 (postponed for the Pandemic)
- The Shestack Award from American Poetry Review, 2015
- The Benjamin Saltman Prize from Red Hen Press, 2015
- The Fine Arts Work Center Fellowships
- Bread Loaf Writers’ Conference Fellowships
- Yaddo Fellowships
- 2004 Writer Magazine/Emily Dickinson Award

== Works ==
- "Nothingism: A Manifesto"
- "Charlie Brown in a Well"; "A Story about Nutrition"; "Hydration", La Petite Zine
- "Oracular", Starting Today: Poems for the First 100 Days
- "Fertile: Sterile:: My Father: Me", American Poetry Review
- "Jokes About Nuns", American Poetry Review
- "Buffy's Sestina", McSweeney's
- "The Other Side", Prairie Schooner, Winter 2008
- "Sublimation Point", Poetry foundation
- "Elegy for Lee", 42 Opus
- "Four Poems", American Poetry Review
  - The Sadness of Antonio, If you died, My Maiden Aunt Is Smoking Again, White Boy

=== Anthologies ===
- Paul Muldoon; David Lehman, eds. (2005). "Moscow". The Best American Poetry 2005. Simon and Schuster. ISBN 978-0-7432-5758-9.
- T. Cole Rachel; Rita D. Costello, eds. (2004). "Last Ditch". Bend, Don't Shatter: Poets on the Beginning of Desire. Soft Skull Press. ISBN 978-1-932360-17-2.
- Michael Montlack, ed. (2009). My Diva: 65 Gay Men on the Women Who Inspire Them. Terrace Books. ISBN 978-0-299-23120-0.
- Vera Pavlova (2005). Valentina Polukhina; Daniel Weissbort (eds.). An anthology of contemporary Russian women poets. Translator Jason Schneiderman. University of Iowa Press. ISBN 978-0-87745-948-4.
- Phillis Levin, ed. (2001). The Penguin book of the sonnet: 500 years of a classic tradition in English. Penguin Books.
