= Matthea Harvey =

American poet

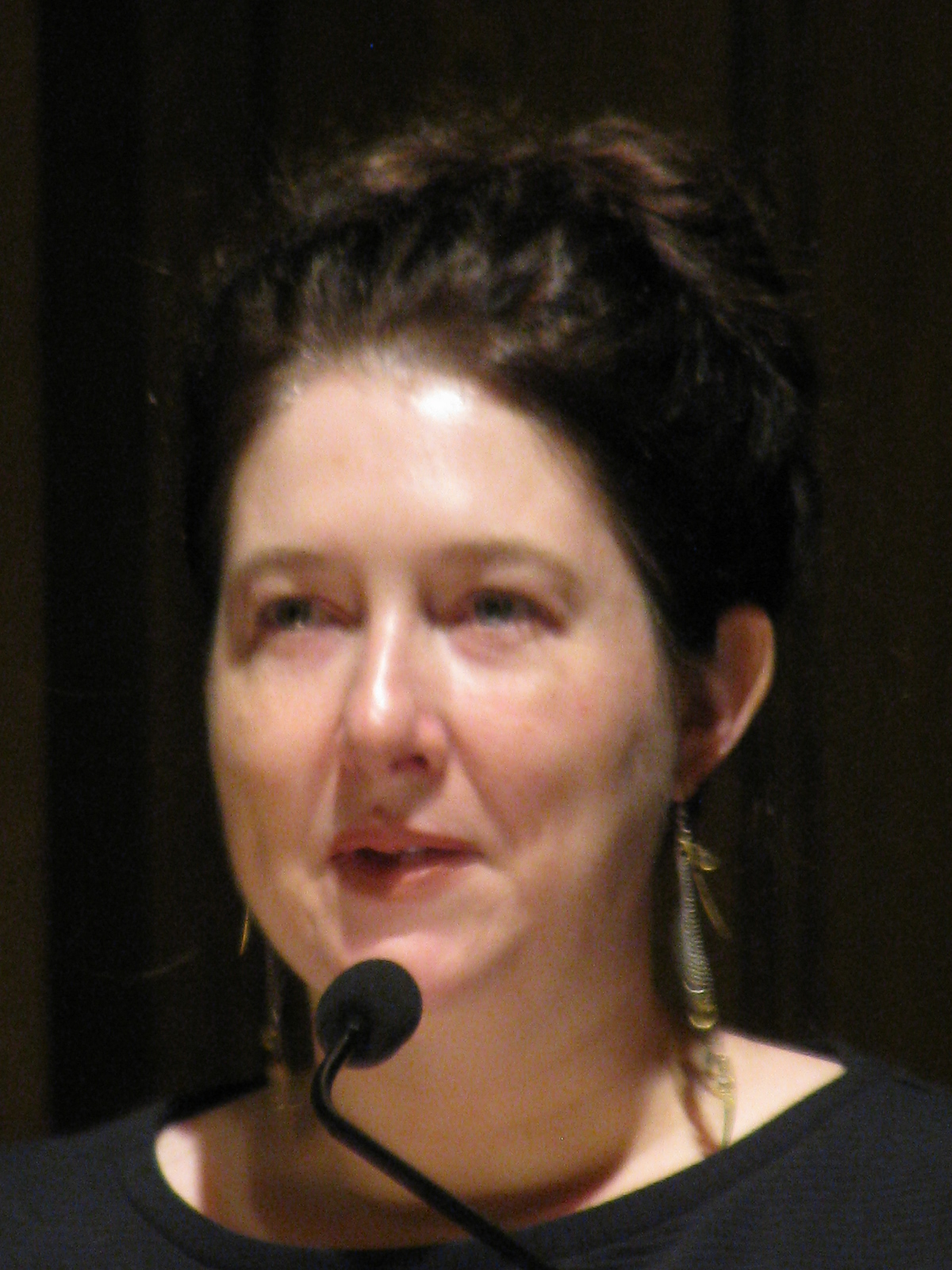
- Born: September 3, 1973 (age 52); Germany
- Education: Harvard University; Iowa Writers' Workshop.
- Occupations: Poet, writer, professor
- Spouse: Rob Casper
- Writing career
- Genre: Poetry
- Notable awards: Kingsley Tufts Poetry Award

Matthea Harvey (born September 3, 1973) is a contemporary American poet, writer and professor. She has published four collections of poetry. The most recent of these, If the Tabloids Are True What Are You?, a collection of poetry and images, was published in 2014. Prior to this, the collection Modern Life (2007) earned her the 2009 Kingsley Tufts Poetry Award and was a finalist for the 2007 National Book Critics Circle Award, and a New York Times Notable Book.

== Life ==
Harvey was born in Germany and grew up in England and Milwaukee, Wisconsin. She earned her B.A. from Harvard University and her M.F.A. from the Iowa Writers' Workshop. She currently lives in Brooklyn and teaches at Sarah Lawrence College. She is the sister of artist Ellen Harvey and is married to editor Rob Casper.

Harvey has served as the poetry editor of American Letters & Commentary as well as a contributing editor to jubilat and BOMB.

She has published poems in literary magazines, including The New Yorker, The New Republic, Slope, Ploughshares, and The American Poetry Review.

Jeannine Hall Gailey described Harvey's Modern Life, as "obsessed with devastated worlds and hybrid forms of life," and the two longest poems in the collection, the "Terror of the Future" and "The Future of Terror," as abecedarian sequences that examine "the dysfunction between civilian and military populations in a stark, futuristic environment." Although Harvey has said that she "didn't set out to write political poems," but to explore "that idea of living in the middle of contradiction—in the grey area, between yes and no," the two poems were nonetheless acclaimed by The New York Times as "among the most arresting poems yet written about the current American political atmosphere . . . all the more surprising coming from a writer whose sensibility seems so resistant to our usual ideas about 'political poetry.' "

== Published works ==
Poetry / Poetry collections

- Pity the Bathtub Its Forced Embrace of the Human Form, Alice James Books, 2000, ISBN 9781882295265
- Sad Little Breathing Machine, Graywolf Press, 2004, ISBN 9781555973964
- Modern Life, Graywolf Press, 2007, ISBN 9781555974800
- If the Tabloids Are True What Are You (Graywolf Press, 2014)
- Matthea Harvey, Amy Jean Porter, When Up and Down Left Town (New York: Cabinet Books, 2016). ISBN 9781932698770, 1932698779

Children's books

- The Little General and the Giant Snowflake. Illustrator Elizabeth Zechel. Tin House Books, LLC. 27 October 2009. ISBN 978-0-9825048-2-6.
- Of Lamb: Poems, McSweeneys Books, 2011, ISBN 9781934781814
- Cecil the Pet Glacier. Schwartz & Wade Books. 2012. ISBN 978-0-375-86773-6.

In translation

- Der kleine General und die riesenhafte Schneeflocke (luxbooks, 2008)
- Du kennst das auch (kookbooks, 2010)

=== Anthologies ===
- The Best American Poetry 2005
