= Cecilia Woloch =

American poet

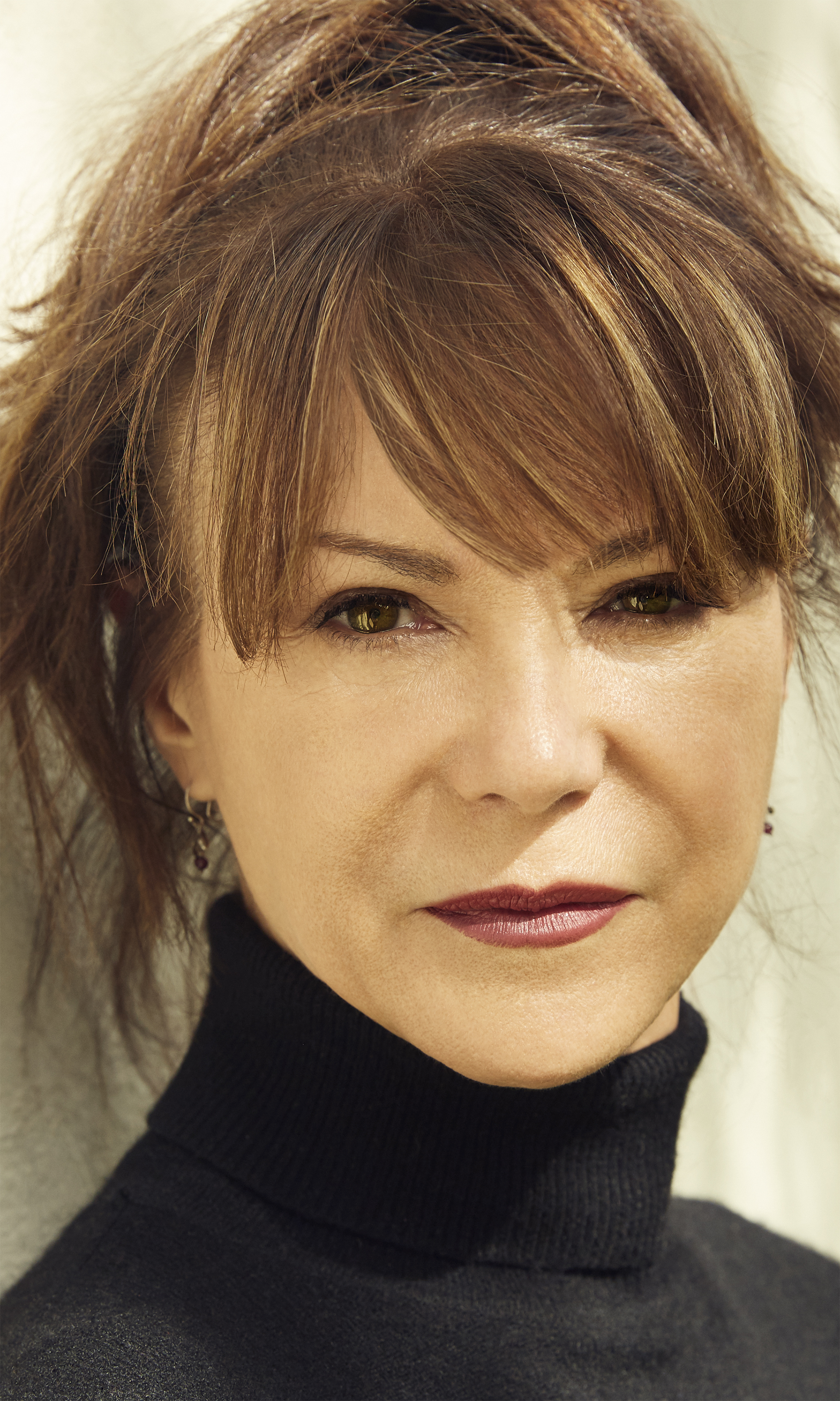
- Born: 1956 (age 69–70); Pittsburgh, PA, U.S.
- Education: Transylvania University
- Occupation: Poet

Cecilia Woloch (born 1956) is an American poet, writer and teacher, known for her work in communities throughout the U.S. and around the world. She is a National Endowment for the Arts fellowship recipient and the author of six collections of poems, a novel, and numerous essays.

== Biography ==
Woloch was born in Pittsburgh, Pennsylvania, and grew up there and in rural Kentucky, one of seven children of a homemaker and an airplane mechanic. She earned a BA at Transylvania University in Lexington, Kentucky, and an MFA at Antioch University, Los Angeles. She is part Roma.

Influenced by Anna Akhmatova, W. S. Merwin, and Walt Whitman, Woloch writes lyrical poems of witness and exploration. Many of her poems arise from her extensive travels. She also writes autobiographical prose and fiction and collaborates on a regular basis with visual artists, theatre artists, musicians and dancers.

Woloch is the author of six poetry collections, including Sacrifice (1997), Late (2003) and Carpathia (2009). Her poetry has been translated into several languages and included in anthologies such as 180 More: Extraordinary Poems for Every Day (2005), Best American Erotic Poems: From 1800 to the Present (2008) and An Introduction to the Prose Poem (2009). The text of her second book, Tsigan: The Gypsy Poem, has been adapted for multi-media presentations in the U.S., France, Greece, and Poland. An updated and expanded addition was published by Two Sylvias Press in 2018. A chapbook of new poems, Earth, was published in early 2015, along with a novel, Sur la Route.

Her honors include fellowships from the National Endowment for the Arts, the Fulbright Foundation, the California Arts Council, CEC/ArtsLink International, Chateau de La Napoule Retreat for Artists, and the Isaac W. Bernheim Foundation. She has been awarded the Pushcart Prize, the Indiana Review Poetry Prize and the New Ohio Review Poetry Prize.

Woloch has conducted creative writing workshops for children and young people, senior citizens, inmates at a prison for the criminally insane, and residents at a shelter for homeless women and their children. She has also served on the faculties of a number of graduate and undergraduate creative writing programs. She was the founding director of Summer Poetry in Idyllwild. She is currently based in Los Angeles.

== Bibliography ==
Woloch has six books of poetry and a novella.

- Sacrifice, Cahuenga Press (1997)
- Tsigan: The Gypsy Poem (2002)
- Late (2003)
- Narcissus (2008)
- Carpathia (2009)
- Earth (2015)
- Sur la Route (2015)

Woloch's poetry has been widely published in such journals as Mississippi Review, Nimrod, Tin House, New Ohio Review, Indiana Review and New Letters. Her essays have appeared in Crab Orchard Review, The New Southerner, and the Journal of Polish American Historical Association.

Her works has been translated into French, German, Bulgarian, Hungarian, Polish, Romanes and Ukrainian.

== Awards and honors ==
- The Pushcart Prize for her long poem in Volume One of The American Journal of Poetry, 2017
- Literature Fellowship from the National Endowment for the Arts, 2011
- Two Sylvas Press Chapbook Prize, 2014
- Indiana Review Prize in Poetry, 2014
- New Ohio Review Prize in Poetry (First Prize), 2009
- USC Center for Excellence in Teaching FIUT Grant, 2007–08
- Tupelo Press Snowbound Series Chapbook Award, 2006
- Georgia Author of the Year, Georgia Writers Association, 2004
