= 2025 deaths in American television =

The following deaths of notable individuals related to American television occurred in 2025.

== January ==
Date	Name	Age	Notes	Sources
January 1	Wayne Osmond	73	Musician and member of The Osmonds. Voiced himself on the animated series of the same name. He also appeared alongside three of his brothers on episodes of shows like Walt Disney's Wonderful World of Color, The Andy Williams Show, The Osmond Family Show and The Travels of Jaimie McPheeters.	
January 3	Harvey Laidman	82	Director (Eight Is Enough, The Waltons, Knots Landing)	
January 3	James Arthur Ray	67	Self-help businessman, motivational speaker, and author (appearances on Larry King Live, The Today Show, and The Oprah Winfrey Show)	
January 3	The Vivienne	32	Welsh drag performer (RuPaul's Drag Race All Stars, RuPaul's Drag Race UK)	
January 6	Dale Wilson	82	Canadian voice actor (G.I. Joe: A Real American Hero, Exosquad, Darkstalkers)	
January 7	Peter Yarrow	86	Musician and member of Peter, Paul and Mary. He appeared alongside his groupmates as a "mystery guest" on What's My Line?.	
January 8	Neil Zurcher	89	Journalist (WJW-TV/Cleveland) and television host.	
January 9	Bill Byrge	92	Actor best known as Bobby on Hey Vern, It's Ernest!. He also played the character in a series of "Me and My Brother Bobby" commercials alongside Gailard Sartain, who played his twin brother Chuck and died five months later (see below)	
January 10	Sam Moore	89	Musician and member of Sam & Dave. He performed alongside his partner Dave Prater on episodes of The Ed Sullivan Show, The Tonight Show, American Bandstand, and The Mike Douglas Show.	
January 10	Bill McCartney	84	American football coach of the Colorado Buffaloes football team and founder of the Promise Keepers; subject of the 30 for 30 documentary "The Gospel According to Mac"	
January 11	James McEachin	94	Actor best known as Harry Tenafly of The NBC Mystery Movie's Tenafly and Lt. Brock of the Perry Mason film series	
January 12	Leslie Charleson	79	Actress best known as Monica Quartermaine on General Hospital.	
January 12	Robert Machray	79	Actor best known as Dobbins on Cheers	
January 14	Jeannot Szwarc	87	French director known for his work in American film and television (Night Gallery, Columbo, Kojak, Baretta, Ally McBeal, The Practice, JAG, Without a Trace, Heroes, Cold Case, Smallville, Fringe, Private Practice, Supernatural, Scandal, Castle, Bones, Grey's Anatomy)	
January 15	David W. Duclon	74	Writer and producer (Punky Brewster, Silver Spoons, Family Matters)	
January 15	David Lynch	78	Director best known as co-creator/producer of Twin Peaks	
January 16	Joan Plowright	95	English actress (Stalin, A Place for Annie, Encore! Encore!)	
January 16	Bob Uecker	90	Baseball announcer (Major League Baseball on NBC, Major League Baseball on ABC), actor (Mr. Belvedere), emcee (Bob Uecker's Wacky World of Sports, WrestleMania III, and WrestleMania IV) and commercial spokesman (Miller Lite).	
January 19	Chuck Schodowski	90	Producer/engineer for WJW-TV/Cleveland from 1961 until his death; co-host of the WJW comedy/movie showcase Big Chuck and Lil' John	
January 20	Lynn Ban	51	Singaporean-born jewelry designer best known for appearing on Bling Empire: New York.	
January 25	Bruce Seth Green	83	Director (Knight Rider, Hercules: The Legendary Journeys, Babylon 5)	
January 30	Dick Button	95	Olympic champion figure skater, skating commentator (most notably for ABC Sports), and producer (The Superstars)	

== February ==
Date	Name	Age	Notes	Sources
February 5	Dennis Richmond	81	News anchor for KTVU/Oakland	
February 7	Bruce French	79	Actor best known as Father Lonigan on Passions.	
February 7	Tony Roberts	85	Actor (The Edge of Night, Rosetti and Ryan, The Thorns, Law & Order)	
February 10	Peter Tuiasosopo	61	Football player (Los Angeles Rams) and actor (Danger Theatre, Kickin' It)	
February 13	John Lawlor	83	Actor best known as Supervisor Leonard Marsh on Phyllis and as Headmaster Steven Bradley on The Facts of Life.	
February 14	Alice Hirson	95	Actress (The Edge of Night, Another World, One Life to Live, Dallas, Ellen)	
February 14	Kevyn Major Howard	69	Canadian actor (Trapper John, M.D., CHiPs, T. J. Hooker)	
February 15	Gran Hamada	74	Japanese professional wrestler (Universal Wrestling Association, World Wrestling Federation)	
February 16	Julian Holloway	80	British actor (If Tomorrow Comes, Beverly Hills, 90210, Remember WENN). He also did voice work for shows like James Bond Jr., Father of the Pride, Star Wars: The Clone Wars, and Regular Show.	
February 18	Gene Hackman	95	Actor (The United States Steel Hour, Brenner, Tallahassee 7000)	
February 19	Mike Lange	76	Sportscaster (Pittsburgh Penguins, Pittsburgh Pirates)	
February 19	Olive Sturgess	91	Canadian-American actress (Studio 57, The People's Choice, Tales of Wells Fargo)	
February 20	Peter Jason	80	Actor (Mike Hammer, Private Eye, Deadwood)	
February 20	Jerry Butler	85	R&B singer-songwriter. He hosted the television specials Doo Wop 50 and Doo Wop 51.	
February 21	Lynne Marie Stewart	78	Actress (Pee-wee's Playhouse, It's Always Sunny in Philadelphia)	
February 23	Al Trautwig	68	Sportscaster for ABC Sports, NBC Sports, and MSG Network	
February 24	Roberta Flack	88	Singer. She performed the theme song "Together Through the Years" for Valerie/The Hogan Family.	
February 24	Thaddeus Matthews	67	American pastor and broadcaster	
February 25	Roberto Orci	51	Mexican-American writer and producer (Hercules: The Legendary Journeys, Xena: Warrior Princess, Fringe, Hawaii Five-0, Sleepy Hollow)	
February 26	Dave Frankel	67	News anchor and weatherperson (WPVI and KYW in Philadelphia)	
February 26	Michelle Trachtenberg	39	Actress (The Adventures of Pete & Pete, Meego, Buffy the Vampire Slayer, Gossip Girl). She also did voice work for Robot Chicken, The Super Hero Squad Show, and SuperMansion.	
February 27	Michael Preece	88	Director (Dallas, Walker, Texas Ranger, The Streets of San Francisco)	
February 28	David Johansen	75	Musician and actor. He appeared on Saturday Night Live under the pseudonym Buster Poindexter as part of the house band during the 1980s; and on shows like The Adventures of Pete & Pete and The Jim Henson Hour.	

== March ==
Date	Name	Age	Notes	Sources
March 1	Angie Stone	63	Singer and rapper. She mostly appeared as herself on shows like Moesha, One on One, and R&B Divas: Atlanta.	
March 2	Felicia Minei Behr	83	Producer and network executive best known for being the executive producer of All My Children.	
March 4	Peter Engel	88	Television producer (Saved by the Bell, City Guys, Hang Time, California Dreams, USA High, Malibu, CA)	
March 4	George Lowe	67	Voice actor and comedian, best known for voicing Space Ghost on the animated television series Space Ghost Coast to Coast and its spinoff Cartoon Planet	
March 5	Denise Alexander	85	Actress best known as Susan Martin on Days of Our Lives and Lesley Webber on General Hospital	
March 5	Pamela Bach	61	Actress (Baywatch, The Young and the Restless, Sirens)	
March 7	D'Wayne Wiggins	64	Singer and founding member of Tony! Toni! Toné!; television credits include Weekends at the D.L.	
March 8	L. J. Smith	66	Author. Her novel series, The Vampire Diaries, was adapted into a 2009 television series of the same name.	
March 11	Dave Mallow	76	Voice actor (Mighty Morphin Power Rangers, VR Troopers, Big Bad Beetleborgs)	
March 11	Clive Revill	94	New Zealand actor and voice actor (voice work includes Dr. Galeo Seaworthy on Snorks)	
March 11	Bob Rivers	68	Radio host and musical parodist (Star Trek: Enterprise)	
March 11	Robert Trebor	71	Character actor best known as Salmoneus on Hercules: The Legendary Journeys and Xena: Warrior Princess.	
March 11	Mark Dobies	65	American stage and television actor (Guiding Light, One Life to Live)	
March 12	Bruce Glover	92	Character actor	
March 15	Wings Hauser	77	Actor (The Young and the Restless, Lightning Force, The Last Precinct)	
March 16	Lenny Schultz	91	Comedian (appearances on The Tonight Show and other talk shows) and actor (Ball Four, Laugh-In, Drawing Power)	
March 17	Marty Callner	78	American director	
March 20	Bob Davis	80	Sportscaster (Kansas City Royals and Kansas Jayhawks)	
March 21	George Foreman	76	Boxer, Olympic Gold medalist, author, actor, sports commentator (HBO World Championship Boxing) and business entrepreneur (George Foreman Grill). Other television work includes George, Family Foreman, Better Late Than Never and Walt Disney World Inside Out. Longtime commercial spokesman for Meineke Car Care Centers.	
March 22	Bill Mercer	99	Professional wrestling play-by-play announcer for World Class Championship Wrestling (WCCW)	
March 25	Alice Tan Ridley	72	Gospel and R&B singer. She competed on season 5 of America's Got Talent.	
March 28	Richard Norton	75	Australian martial artist, actor, stunt performer, stunt coordinator, security consultant, and fight choreographer	
March 29	Richard Chamberlain	90	Actor (Dr. Kildare, Shōgun, The Thorn Birds)	
March 31	Sian Barbara Allen	78	Actress (The Waltons; Bonanza; Kojak; Gunsmoke; Adam-12)	
March 31	Patty Maloney	89	Actress (Welcome to Pooh Corner, Dumbo's Circus) and voice actress (The Little Rascals)	

== April ==
Date	Name	Age	Notes	Sources
April 1	Val Kilmer	65	Actor. His television roles include the voice of KITT in the 2008-09 remake of Knight Rider.	
April 6	Jay North	73	Actor (Dennis the Menace, Maya) and voice actor (Arabian Knights, Here Comes the Grump, The Pebbles and Bamm-Bamm Show)	
April 7	Joey D. Vieira	80	Actor (The Many Loves of Dobie Gillis, My Three Sons, Married... with Children)	
April 8	Nicky Katt	54	Actor (Fantasy Island, Boston Public)	
April 9	Mel Novak	90	Actor (Mannix)	
April 10	Ted Kotcheff	94	Canadian-born Bulgarian director (Red Shoe Diaries, Law & Order: Special Victims Unit, Borrowed Hearts)	
April 11	Don Mischer	85	American producer of live events including Super Bowl Halftime shows and the Oscars	
April 13	Jean Marsh	90	English actress (9 to 5, The Tomorrow People)	
April 14	Jed the Fish	69	Disc jockey	
April 15	Wink Martindale	91	Disc jockey, radio personality, game show host, and television producer (Gambit, Tic-Tac-Dough, Headline Chasers, High Rollers, The Last Word, Trivial Pursuit, Debt)	
April 16	Patrick Adiarte	81	Filipino-born American theater, film and television actor and dancer (The Brady Bunch, Hawaii Five-0, M*A*S*H)	
April 20	Mike Patrick	80	Sportscaster, most prominently for ESPN	
April 21	Will Hutchins	94	Actor (Sugarfoot)	
April 22	Lar Park Lincoln	63	Actress (Knots Landing)	
April 23	Steve "Mongo" McMichael	67	Hall of Fame defensive tackle (Chicago Bears) and professional wrestler (World Championship Wrestling)	
April 23	Lulu Roman	78	Comedian (Hee Haw)	
April 27	Jiggly Caliente	44	Filipino-American drag performer and entertainer. She rose to prominence after competing on the fourth season of RuPaul's Drag Race (2012) and the sixth season of RuPaul's Drag Race All Stars (2021).	
April 28	Priscilla Pointer	100	Actress (China Smith, Where the Heart Is, Dallas)	

== May ==
Date	Name	Age	Notes	Sources
May 1	Ruth Buzzi	88	Comedian (Rowan & Martin's Laugh-In), actress (Sesame Street, The Lost Saucer) and voice actress (Pound Puppies, The Berenstain Bears)	
May 1	Charley Scalies	84	Actor best known as Thomas "Horseface" Pakusa on The Wire.	
May 2	Kirk Medas	33	Television personality best known for appearing on Floribama Shore.	
May 2	Jim Smith	70	Animator (Mighty Mouse: The New Adventures, The Ren & Stimpy Show, The Ripping Friends)	
May 3	Steve Pepoon	68	Writer/producer, best known for ALF, The Jackie Thomas Show, The Wild Thornberrys, and the Simpsons episode "Homer vs. Lisa and the 8th Commandment"	
May 7	Joe Don Baker	89	Actor (Honey West, Iron Horse, Judd, for the Defense)	
May 11	Sabu	61	Professional wrestler (ECW, USWA, WWE, TNA)	
May 15	Taina Elg	95	Finnish-American actress (Wagon Train, Guiding Light, One Life to Live)	
May 17	Roger Nichols	84	Commercial jingle songwriter, famous jingles included those for Crocker Bank ("We've Only Just Begun") and Kodak ("Times of Your Life")	
May 19	Kathleen Hughes	96	Actress (Alfred Hitchcock Presents, The Bob Cummings Show, The Adventures of Ozzie and Harriet)	
May 20	George Wendt	76	Actor best known as Norm Peterson on Cheers.	
May 22	Pippa Scott	90	Actress (Mr. Lucky, Have Gun - Will Travel, The Twilight Zone)	
May 23	Sacha Jenkins	53	Television producer. He wrote for season 1 of The Boondocks and created the reality show Ego Trip's The (White) Rapper Show.	
May 23	Jeff Margolis	78	Television director and producer	
May 25	Phil Robertson	79	College football quarterback and businessman and founder of the Duck Commander brand. Television work included Duckmen, Duck Commander and Duck Dynasty.	
May 25	Stan Atkinson	92	Television news reporter and anchor (KCRA, KOVR)	
May 27	Ed Gale	61	Actor (Land of the Lost, Weird Science)	
May 29	Alf Clausen	84	Composer best known for scoring many episodes of The Simpsons between 1990 and 2017.	
May 30	Valerie Mahaffey	71	Actress best known for starring in the NBC daytime soap opera The Doctors.	
May 30	Renée Victor	86	Actress best known as Lupita on Weeds.	
May 30	Loretta Swit	87	Actress best known as Major Margaret "Hot Lips" Houlihan on M*A*S*H.	
May 31	John Brenkus	54	Producer, director, and television personality	

== June ==
Date	Name	Age	Notes	Sources
June 1	Jonathan Joss	59	Actor best known for being the voice of John Redcorn on King of the Hill.	
June 3	Juliette Powell	54	American-Canadian media expert, tech ethicist, business advisor, author and beauty pageant titleholder who was crowned Miss Canada 1989, the contest's first Black Canadian winner.	
June 6	Renee Ferguson	75	News reporter (WMAQ in Chicago)	
June 9	Chris Robinson	86	Actor (12 O'Clock High, General Hospital, Another World, The Bold and the Beautiful)	
June 9	Sylvester Stewart	82	Lead singer of Sly and the Family Stone. He and his groupmates performed on shows like The Mike Douglas Show, The Midnight Special and The Dick Cavett Show.	
June 10	Gary England	85	Television meteorologist (served as chief meteorologist at KWTV/Oklahoma City from 1972 to 2013); was the first television meteorologist to detect a tornado using Doppler radar, and developed the First Warning on-screen alert software and Storm Tracker time-of-arrival radar application used in TV weather presentations	
June 10	Harris Yulin	87	Actor (Star Trek: Deep Space Nine, Frasier, Buffy the Vampire Slayer, Entourage)	
June 10	Terry Louise Fisher	79	Television screenwriter and producer (L.A. Law, Cagney & Lacey)	
June 11	Brian Wilson	82	Singer-songwriter and founding member of The Beach Boys (TV appearances included Duck Dodgers and The New Leave It to Beaver)	
June 11	Ananda Lewis	52	Television host (VJ at MTV, host of The Ananda Lewis Show in syndication)	
June 12	Charlie Gaddy	93	News anchor (most notably as lead anchor at WRAL/Raleigh from 1974 to 1994)	
June 13	Betsy Gay	96	Actress	
June 14	Afa Ah Loo	39	Fashion designer best known for competing Project Runway	
June 16	Dave Scott	52	Choreographer (Dancing with the Stars, So You Think You Can Dance)	
June 17	Anne Burrell	55	Chef and television personality best known for hosting Worst Cooks in America.	
June 17	Gailard Sartain	78	Actor, cast member of Hee Haw and Cher, played the lead in "Me and My Brother Bobby" commercials for Carden & Cherry and Hey Vern, It's Ernest! alongside Bill Byrge (who died five months prior, see above), created the cult favorite movie host "Mazeppa" for Tulsa television	
June 19	Jack Betts	96	Actor (Checkmate, Perry Mason, General Hospital, The F.B.I., One Life to Live, Kojak, Guiding Light, Generations, In the Heat of the Night, Sinatra, Seinfeld, Frasier, Everybody Loves Raymond, Power Rangers Lost Galaxy, Friends)	
June 19	Lynn Hamilton	95	Actress best known as Verdie Foster on The Waltons and Donna Harris on Sanford and Son.	
June 22	Joe Marinelli	68	Actor best known as Bunny Tagliatti on Santa Barbara and Donny Spagnoli on The Morning Show	
June 24	Bobby Sherman	81	Singer and actor (member of the house band on Shindig!, Jeremy Bolt on Here Come the Brides, Bobby Conway on Getting Together)	
June 26	Rick Hurst	79	Actor best known as Deputy Cletus Hogg on The Dukes of Hazzard	
June 26	Bill Moyers	91	Press secretary to President Lyndon Johnson; analyst and correspondent for CBS News and NBC News, presidential debate moderator, hosted multiple shows for PBS (Bill Moyers Journal, NOW with Bill Moyers, Moyers & Company, and 70 individual specials)	
June 26	Lalo Schifrin	93	Argentine composer best known for his television themes (Eyewitness News, Mission: Impossible, Mannix)	

== July ==
Date	Name	Age	Notes	Sources
July 1	Jimmy Swaggart	90	Televangelist and gospel musician	
July 2	Sophia Hutchins	29	Socialite, media personality, businesswoman, charity executive, and manager of Caitlyn Jenner who appeared on I Am Cait	
July 2	Julian McMahon	56	Australian-American actor best known for roles on Charmed, Nip/Tuck, and FBI: Most Wanted.	
July 3	Michael Madsen	67	Actor (Our Family Honor, Vengeance Unlimited, Big Apple, Tilt, Powers)	
July 4	Mark Snow	78	Composer best known for composing the theme music for The X-Files	
July 8	James Carter Cathcart	71	Voice actor (Pokémon, Teenage Mutant Ninja Turtles)	
July 8	David Flebotte	65	Writer and producer (Desperate Housewives, Boardwalk Empire, Tulsa King)	
July 10	David Gergen	83	White House advisor, political analyst for CNN	
July 11	Rene Kirby	70	Actor best known as Hoppy on Carnivàle	
July 14	Eileen Fulton	91	Actress best known as Lisa Grimaldi on As the World Turns.	
July 14	John MacArthur	86	Evangelist (Grace to You).	
July 16	Connie Francis	87	Singer. She made several television appearances performing her music and appeared in an episode of Bob Hope Presents the Chrysler Theatre as Sister Mary Clare.	
July 17	Alan Bergman	99	Songwriter, co-wrote theme songs to Maude ("And Then There's Maude"), Good Times, The Sandy Duncan Show and Alice along with his wife Marilyn.	
July 18	Kenneth Washington	88	Actor (Hogan's Heroes, Adam-12)	
July 20	Frank Maffei	85	Musician and member of Danny & the Juniors. He performed alongside his groupmates on episodes of shows like American Bandstand, The Midnight Special and The Pat Boone Chevy Showroom.	
July 20	Tom Troupe	97	Actor best known as Father Marconi on Who's the Boss?	
July 20	Malcolm-Jamal Warner	54	Actor (The Cosby Show, Here and Now, Malcolm & Eddie, Listen Up, Reed Between the Lines)	
July 21	Dan Ziskie	80	Actor best known as CJ Liquori on Treme and Vice President Jim Mathews on House of Cards	
July 22	Chuck Mangione	84	Flugelhornist (recurring role as a fictionalized version of himself on King of the Hill)	
July 22	Ozzy Osbourne	76	English musician and member of Black Sabbath best known for appearing on The Osbournes alongside his wife Sharon and two of their children, Kelly and Jack.	
July 23	Alfie Wise	81	Actor best known as Sidney "Hatter" Pacelli on Trauma Center and Rabbit Ears on Uncle Croc's Block	
July 24	Hulk Hogan	71	WWE Hall of Fame professional wrestler; television credits include Hulk Hogan's Rock 'n' Wrestling, Thunder in Paradise, Hogan Knows Best, Brooke Knows Best, American Gladiators, Hulk Hogan's Celebrity Championship Wrestling	
July 26	Tom Lehrer	97	Musician and satirist (That Was the Week That Was, The Electric Company)	
July 29	Alon Abutbul	60	Israeli actor (NCIS, Fringe, The Mentalist, Castle)	

== August ==
Date	Name	Age	Notes	Sources
August 1	Jonathan Kaplan	77	Director (ER, Law & Order: Special Victims Unit, Crossing Jordan, Without a Trace)	
August 2	Kelley Mack	33	Actress (The Walking Dead, 9-1-1, Chicago Med)	
August 3	Loni Anderson	79	Actress (WKRP in Cincinnati, Partners in Crime, Easy Street, Nurses, The Mullets, So Notorious)	
August 4	Jane Morgan	101	Singer and actress (The Ed Sullivan Show, The Jack Benny Program, The Colgate Comedy Hour)	
August 6	Jon Miyahara	83	Actor best known as Brett Kobashigawa on Superstore	
August 10	David Ketchum	97	Actor best known as Agent 13 on Get Smart	
August 11	Danielle Spencer	60	Actress best known as Dee Thomas on What's Happening!! and What's Happening Now!!	
August 12	Ronnie Rondell Jr.	88	Stuntman (Charlie's Angels)	
August 13	Art Wander	97	Broadcaster (TV work included sports commentaries for Empire Sports Network and WBBZ-TV)	
August 15	Tristan Rogers	79	Australian actor best known as Robert Scorpio on General Hospital	
August 17	Terence Stamp	87	English actor best known as Jor-El on Smallville	
August 20	Frank Caprio	88	Judge (Caught in Providence)	
August 23	Jerry Adler	96	Actor (The Sopranos, The Good Wife, Rescue Me)	
August 24	Floyd Levine	93	Actor (Cagney & Lacey, Melrose Place)	
August 25	Frank Price	95	Producer (The Virginian)	
August 28	Randy Boone	83	Actor (The Virginian)	
August 28	Gary Burbank	84	Voice of Earl Pitts Uhmerikun (commentaries for WGN America in the late 2000s)	
August 29	Charles Bierbauer	83	Correspondent for CNN	
August 30	Mark Knoller	73	Correspondent for CBS News	

== September ==
Date	Name	Age	Notes	Sources
September 1	Graham Greene	73	Canadian First Nations actor (American Gods, 1883, The Last of Us)	
September 4	Baddiewinkle	97	Internet personality (television appearances included Candidly Nicole and Ridiculousness)	
September 4	Ted Mann	72	Canadian writer/producer, notably on NYPD Blue and Deadwood	
September 5	Ken Dryden	78	Canadian hockey player (goalie with the Montreal Canadiens) and Olympic hockey analyst for ABC Sports	
September 9	Polly Holliday	88	Actress best known as Florence Jean "Flo" Castleberry on Alice and its spinoff Flo	
September 10	Charlie Kirk	31	Right-wing commentator (Real America's Voice) (more info: Assassination of Charlie Kirk)	
September 10	Bobby Hart	86	Songwriter (The Monkees)	
September 10	Paula Shaw	84	Actress (Ironside, The Bob Newhart Show, Starsky & Hutch, Barney Miller, Three's Company, Lou Grant)	
September 11	Bruce DuMont	81	Broadcaster (Beyond the Beltway for WYCC), founder of the Museum of Broadcast Communications	
September 13	John Masius	75	Writer and producer (St. Elsewhere, Touched by an Angel, Providence, The White Shadow)	
September 14	Pat Crowley	91	Actress best known as Joan Nash on Please Don't Eat the Daisies	
September 15	Ron Friedman	93	Producer and writer (G.I. Joe: A Real American Hero, The Transformers)	
September 16	Robert Redford	89	Actor (Alfred Hitchcock Presents, The Twilight Zone)	
September 17	Riff Markowitz	86	Canadian-born producer and host (The Hilarious House of Frightenstein, The Wolfman Jack Show, The Hitchhiker, several HBO comedy specials)	
September 19	Sonny Curtis	88	Singer-songwriter best known for composing the theme song for The Mary Tyler Moore Show.	
September 21	Stan Turner	81	News anchor (KSTP-TV/St. Paul, All News Channel)	
September 22	Lee Weaver	95	Actor (The Bill Cosby Show, Easy Street, The Fresh Prince of Bel-Air, It's Always Sunny in Philadelphia)	
September 23	Claudia Cardinale	87	Tunisian-born Italian actress (Jesus of Nazareth, Princess Daisy)	
September 24	Belva Davis	92	Journalist for San Francisco's KTVU, KPIX-TV, and KRON-TV	
September 29	Margaret DePriest	94	Actress (Abby Cameron on The Edge of Night) and writer for several soap operas (most notably Where the Heart Is, General Hospital, and Days of Our Lives)	
September 30	Joshua Allen	36	Dancer (winner of season 4 of So You Think You Can Dance) and actor (featured on Community and American Horror Story)	

== October ==
Date	Name	Age	Notes	Sources
October 1	Jane Goodall	91	English primatologist. She voiced herself in an episode of The Wild Thornberrys.	
October 1	Jerry Leggio	90	Actor (In the Heat of the Night, American Horror Story: Freak Show, Scream Queens)	
October 2	Ed Williams	98	Broadcasting teacher and actor (best known as lab scientist Ted Olsen on Police Squad!)	
October 3	Kimberly Hébert Gregory	52	Actress best known as Dr. Belinda Brown on Vice Principals	
October 5	Ron Dean	87	Actor (Lady Blue, T. J. Hooker, Crime Story)	
October 6	John Woodvine	96	English actor (Countdown to War, Fatherland, The Crown)	
October 7	Ian Freebairn-Smith	93	Composer (Cagney & Lacey, Magnum, P.I.)	
October 8	Terry "Buzzy" Johnson	86	Musician and member of The Flamingos. He and his groupmates were featured on American Bandstand five times during its run.	
October 10	Ted Hartley	100	Actor (Peyton Place, Chopper One)	
October 10	Alex Wallau	80	Boxing commentator and president of ABC.	
October 11	Diane Keaton	79	Actress (Love, American Style, Night Gallery, The F.B.I.)	
October 13	Tony Caunter	88	English actor (S.O.S. Titanic)	
October 14	D'Angelo	51	Singer-songwriter. He performed on an episode of The Tonight Show Starring Jimmy Fallon.	
October 14	Penelope Milford	77	Actress (The Blue Knight, The Burning Bed, The Hitchhiker)	
October 15	Samantha Eggar	86	English-American actress (Anna and the King, Love Story, Double Indemnity)	
October 16	Ace Frehley	74	Musician and founding member of Kiss (The Paul Lynde Halloween Special, Kiss Meets the Phantom of the Park, Family Guy)	
October 16	Susan Stamberg	87	Radio journalist. She hosted Alive from Off Center from 1985 to 1986.	
October 19	Mo	58	Professional wrestler (WWE)	
October 20	Michael DeLano	84	Actor (Rhoda, Hill Street Blues)	
October 23	June Lockhart	100	Actress best known as Ruth Martin on Lassie and Dr. Maureen Robinson on Lost in Space	
October 27	Jerry Taff	85	News anchor for WISN-TV/Milwaukee	
October 29	Maria Riva	100	Actress (various anthology series including Studio One, Suspense, and The Philco Television Playhouse)	
October 30	Marjorie Johnson	106	Baker. She made numerous appearances on talk shows like The Tonight Show with Jay Leno, The Rosie O'Donnell Show, The View, and The Kelly Clarkson Show.	
October 31	Adam Greenberg	88	Israeli-American cinematographer (The New Odd Couple, A Woman Called Golda, Remembrance of Love)	
October 31	Tchéky Karyo	72	Turkish-born French actor (And the Band Played On, From the Earth to the Moon)	

== November ==
Date	Name	Age	Notes	Sources
November 1	Anna Sandor	76	Hungarian-born Canadian/American writer (TV movies including Tarzan in Manhattan, Miss Rose White, and Amelia Earhart: The Final Flight)	
November 1	Ralph Senensky	102	Director (The Fugitive, Star Trek: The Original Series, The Waltons, The Partridge Family, Dynasty)	
November 2	Betty Harford	98	Actress (Gunsmoke, The Alfred Hitchcock Hour, The Paper Chase, Dynasty)	
November 2	Bob Trumpy	80	Former pro football tight end (Cincinnati Bengals) and sports commentator for NBC Sports	
November 3	Dick Cheney	84	Politician and 46th Vice President. He appeared as himself on Who Is America? among other television appearances.	
November 3	Diane Ladd	89	Actress (The Secret Storm, Alice, Kingdom Hospital)	
November 4	Elizabeth Franz	84	Actress best known as Linda Loman on Death of a Salesman	
November 5	Mary Ann Wilson	87	Fitness instructor and host of Sit and Be Fit	
November 9	Paul Tagliabue	84	Commissioner of the National Football League from 1989 to 2006; prominently featured in television coverage of the NFL draft and Super Bowl postgame ceremonies	
November 10	Jonathan Pienaar	63	South African actor (Crusoe, Roots)	
November 11	Cleto Escobedo III	59	Bandleader of Cleto and the Cletones, the house band for Jimmy Kimmel Live!	
November 11	Geoff Fox	75	Meteorologist (WTIC, WTNH)	
November 11	Sally Kirkland	84	Actress (Hawaii Five-O, Police Story, Three's Company)	
November 12	Jim Avila	70	Journalist and news correspondent (NBC News, ABC News, KNBC)	
November 14	John Beam	66	Football coach for Laney College. He appeared on Last Chance U.	
November 14	Dan McGrath	61	Writer and producer (The Simpsons, King of the Hill, Saturday Night Live, Mission Hill)	
November 16	Bob Caudle	95	Meteorologist (WRAL-TV) and professional wrestling announcer (Mid-Atlantic Wrestling)	
November 17	Alice and Ellen Kessler	89	German singers, dancers, and actresses. They made appearances on shows like The Red Skelton Hour, The Ed Sullivan Show, and The Danny Kaye Show.	
November 20	Stephen Downing	87	Screenwriter and producer (RoboCop: The Series, T.J. Hooker, MacGyver)	
November 21	Carl Ciarfalio	72	Actor and stuntman (The Incredible Hulk, The Fall Guy, Scarecrow and Mrs. King)	
November 22	Jonathan Farwell	93	Actor (The Young and the Restless)	
November 24	Jimmy Cliff	81	Jamaican musician. He performed as a musical guest during the first season of Saturday Night Live in 1976.	
November 25	Colleen Jones	65	Canadian curler and broadcaster (Olympics on NBC)	
November 27	Pauline Potter	62	Television personality best known for appearing on My 600-lb Life.	
November 28	Ingrid van Bergen	94	German actress. She appeared as herself on Sharknado 5: Global Swarming.	
November 29	Toni Lamond	93	Australian actress, singer, dancer, and comedian (Starsky & Hutch, The Bob Newhart Show, Eight Is Enough)	

== December ==
Date	Name	Age	Notes	Sources
December 1	Ebo Elder	46	Professional boxer (competitor in season 2 of The Contender)	
December 2	Criscilla Anderson	45	Television personality best known for appearing on Country Ever After.	
December 3	Steve Cropper	84	Guitarist, songwriter, and record producer. He appeared as himself on the "Weird Al" Yankovic mockumentary The Compleat Al.	
December 4	Cary-Hiroyuki Tagawa	75	Actor (Johnny Tsunami, Teen Titans: Trouble in Tokyo, The Man in the High Castle, Lost in Space)	
December 5	Josh Becker	67	Director and screenwriter best known for his work on Xena: Warrior Princess.	
December 5	Frank Gehry	96	Canadian-American architect. He appeared as himself on episodes of Arthur and The Simpsons.	
December 7	Rachael Carpani	45	Australian actress (NCIS: Los Angeles, Against the Wall)	
December 10	Jeff Garcia	50	Actor and comedian best known for voicing Sheen Estevez on The Adventures of Jimmy Neutron, Boy Genius and Planet Sheen, as well as Pip the Mouse on Back at the Barnyard.	
December 10	Jim Ward	66	Voice actor and radio personality best known for voicing Doug Dimmadome and Chet Ubetcha on The Fairly OddParents.	
December 11	Stanley Baxter	99	Scottish actor, comedian, impressionist, and author. He played various roles in Bing Crosby's Merrie Olde Christmas.	
December 11	May Britt	91	Swedish actress (The Danny Thomas Hour, Mission: Impossible, The Most Deadly Game)	
December 12	Peter Greene	60	Actor (Hardball, As the World Turns, Law & Order)	
December 12	Jayne Trcka	62	Bodybuilder, fitness trainer, and actress (The Drew Carey Show, Whose Line Is It Anyway?, Tim and Eric Awesome Show, Great Job!)	
December 13	Abraham Quintanilla	86	Musician and father of Selena. He produced Selena: The Series.	
December 13	Dave Ward	86	Broadcast journalist (KTRK-TV/Houston)	
December 14	Carl Carlton	72	Singer and songwriter. He made appearances on shows like The Merv Griffin Show, The Midnight Special, and American Bandstand.	
December 14	Anthony Geary	78	Actor best known as Luke Spencer on General Hospital.	
December 14	Rob Reiner	78	Actor and director best known as Michael Stivic on All in the Family.	
December 15	John Antrobus	92	English playwright and screenwriter (Alfred Hitchcock Presents)	
December 16	Gil Gerard	82	Actor best known as Dr. Alan Stewart on The Doctors and the title character of Buck Rogers in the 25th Century	
December 17	Peter Arnett	91	New Zealand-born journalist best known for his work at CNN.	
December 17	Eddie Sotto	67	Experiential designer, mixed-media producer, and conceptualist (developer of shows for VH1, ABC, Showtime, and CNN)	
December 18	Richard Dimitri	83	Actor (twins Bertram and Renaldo in When Things Were Rotten) and writer (Going Bananas, Daddy Dearest)	
December 18	Roger Ewing	83	Actor best known as Thad Greenwood on Gunsmoke.	
December 18	Helen Siff	88	Character actress (Lou Grant, Cagney & Lacey, Silver Spoons)	
December 19	Amanda Brotchie	57	Australian director (Girlboss)	
December 19	James Ransone	46	Actor best known as Ziggy Sobotka on The Wire and as Corporal Josh Ray Person on Generation Kill.	
December 22	Pat Finn	60	Character actor best known as Phil Jr. on Murphy Brown, Jim Frost on Ed, Bill Norwood on The Middle and Bob Forman on Marvin Marvin.	
December 24	Mohammad Bakri	72	Palestinian actor (Tyrant, Of Kings and Prophets, The Night Of)	
December 24	Neil Frank	94	Meteorologist (KHOU/Houston)	
December 26	Melanie Watson Bernhardt	57	Actress and disability advocate (best known as Kathy Gordon on Diff'rent Strokes)	
December 27	Marcia Rodd	87	Actress (The New Dick Van Dyke Show, Young Dr. Kildare, Medical Center)	
December 28	Stewart Cheifet	87	Television presenter (best known for hosting Computer Chronicles)	
December 29	John Mulrooney	67	Comedian, host (Fox's The Late Show and Comic Strip Live), actor (several shows, including 1st & Ten and Ellen), and radio personality.	
December 30	Isiah Whitlock Jr.	71	Actor best known as Clay Davis on The Wire.	
December 31	Jon Korkes	80	Actor best known as Tom Robinson on Oz.	
