= Still Kicking: The Fabulous Palm Springs Follies =

1997 American short documentary film

- Directed by: Mel Damski
- Produced by: Mel Damski; Andrea Blaugrund; David B. Kaminsky; Janice Kaminsky
- Starring: Riff Markowitz
- Cinematography: Scott Lloyd-Davies
- Edited by: Nancy Morrison; Simon Epstein
- Music by: Dennis McCarthy; Johnny Harris
- Distributed by: Little Apple Productions
- Release date: 1997
- Running time: 39 minutes
- Country: United States
- Language: English

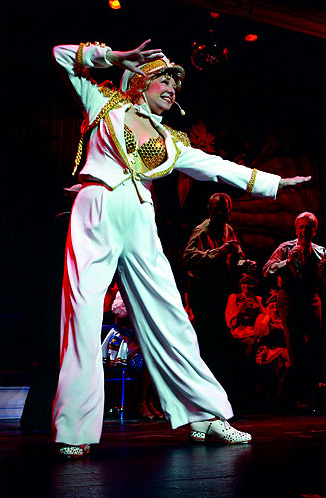
Dorothy Kloss performing at the Follies in 2007

Still Kicking: The Fabulous Palm Springs Follies is a 1997 American short documentary film directed by Mel Damski. It was nominated at the 70th Academy Awards for Best Documentary Short Subject. It features The Fabulous Palm Springs Follies, which was formerly staged at the Palm Springs, California Plaza Theatre.

Riff Markowitz is presented as the host and creator of the Follies. Some of the featured performers include Dorothy Kloss, Henry LeTang and Tempest Storm.

== Notes ==
- Still Kicking: The Fabulous Palm Springs Follies (1997). Santa Monica, CA: Little Apple Productions. VHS. (39 minutes). OCLC 38964599
