= Peggy March =

American pop singer (born 1948)

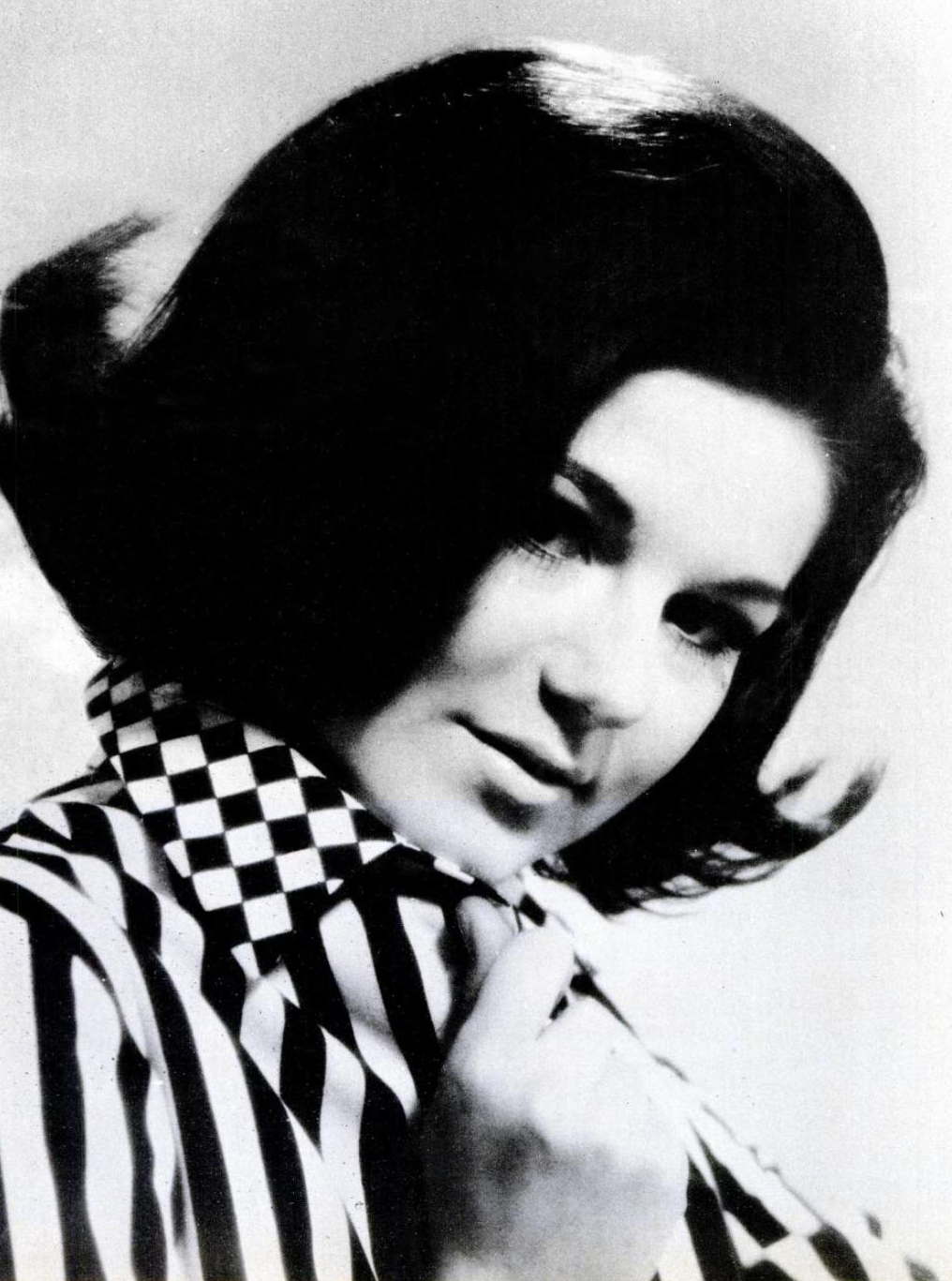
- March in 1967
- Born: Margaret Annemarie Battavio; March 8, 1948 (age 78); Lansdale, Pennsylvania, U.S.
- Other name: Little Peggy March
- Occupation: Singer
- Years active: 1962−present

Peggy March (born Margaret Annemarie Battavio, March 8, 1948) is an American pop singer. In the United States, she is primarily known for her 1963 million-selling song "I Will Follow Him". While she had only a few further chart successes in the United States, she achieved numerous hits in European countries, especially Germany, well into the 1970s.

== Career ==
Born in Lansdale, Pennsylvania to an Italian-American family, March was discovered at age 13 singing at her cousin's wedding and was introduced to record producers Hugo & Luigi. They gave her the nickname Little Peggy March because she was 4 ft 10 in (1.47 m) tall (though she later grew to be 5ft 4in), she was only 13, the record she did with them was "Little Me", and her birthday was in March.

On April 24, 1963, her single "I Will Follow Him" soared to number one on the United States chart. She recorded the song in early January 1963 and it was released on January 22, when she was 14. March became the youngest female artist with a number one hit, at 15, in late April 1963, a record that still stands for the Billboard Hot 100. The recording also reached number one in Australia, New Zealand, South Africa, Japan, and Scandinavia. It failed to chart in the United Kingdom. It was a translation of the French song "Chariot" recorded a year earlier by Petula Clark. March also became the first white female solo artist to hit number one on the Billboard R&B chart.

March's success also came with financial trouble. She was a minor and the "Coogan Law" prevented her parents from managing her money. The responsibility was placed on her manager, Russell Smith. It was discovered in 1966 that he had squandered the fortune, leaving her with $500. March graduated from Lansdale Catholic High School in 1966.

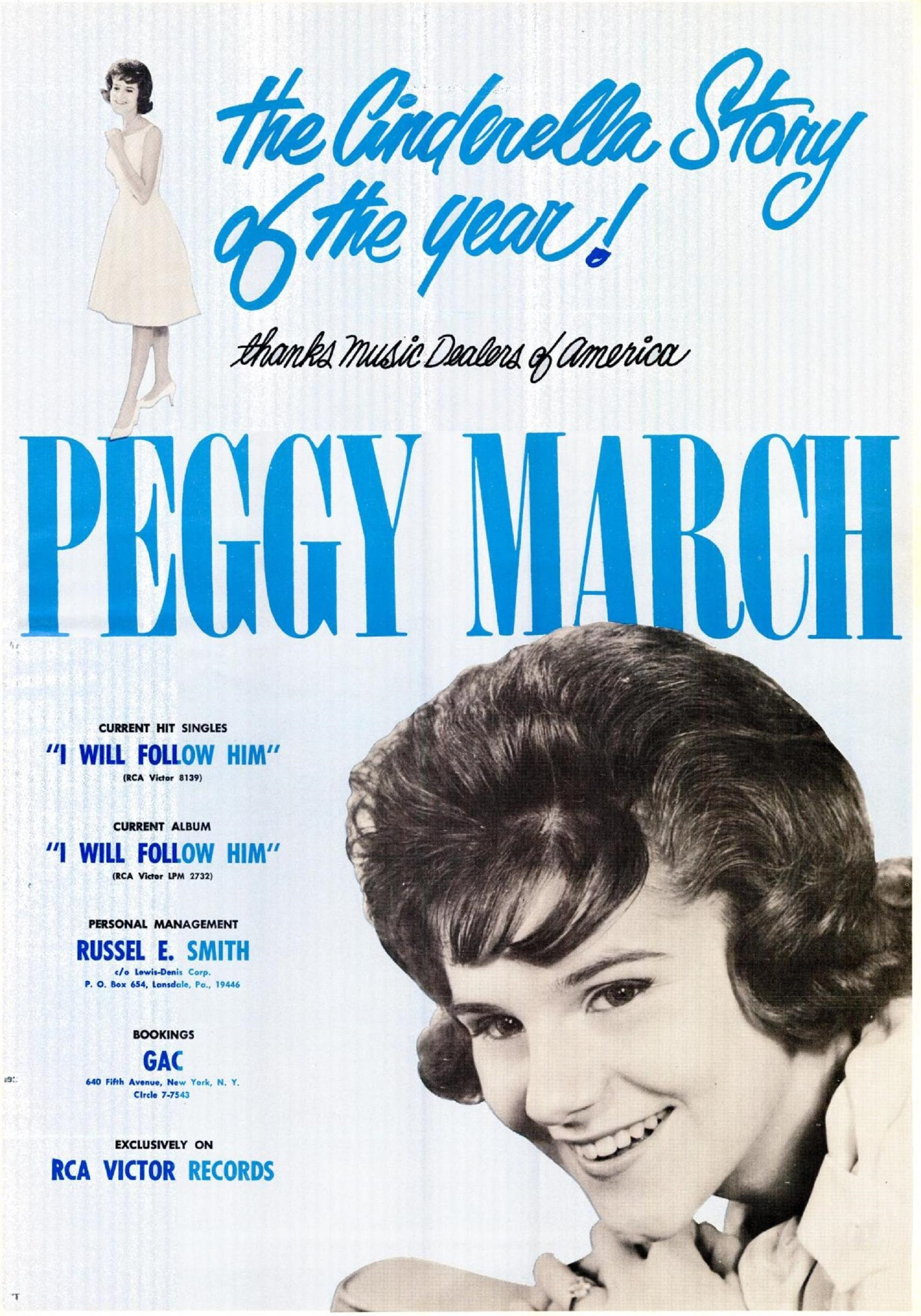
Billboard advertisement, July 27, 1963

Although she is remembered in the United States by some as a one-hit wonder, her singles, "I Wish I Were a Princess" and "Hello Heartache, Goodbye Love", made the top 30 in the US, with the latter also reaching number 29 on the UK Singles Chart. As with many American artists, March's career in her native country was derailed in part by the British Invasion, which at the time was pushing many American acts out of popularity, and she had no hits at home once the Invasion began in 1964. Recording for RCA Victor, March made 18 singles from 1964 to 1971. She also cut several albums, none of which sold well in the United States.

She began having a strong presence in the European and Asian music markets and moved to Germany in 1969. She won the Deutscher Schlager Contest in 1965, and her song "Mit 17 hat man noch Träume" ("At 17 you still have dreams") placed number 2 in the German Singles Chart. This was followed by German songs like "In der Carnaby Street", "Einmal verliebt – immer verliebt", "Romeo und Julia" ("On Carnaby Street", "Once in Love – Always in Love", "Romeo and Juliet" ... number one in German Chart), "Der Schuster macht schöne Schuhe" ("'The Cobbler Makes Beautiful Shoes"), "Telegramm aus Tennessee", "Die Maschen der Männer", "Wie ein Tiger" and "Das sind die Träume, die man so träumt".

Her commercial success in Germany continued through much of the 1970s; she tried her luck in representing Germany in the Eurovision Song Contest in 1969, only to be placed second in the national final with the song "Hey! Das ist Musik für mich". March made another Eurovision attempt in 1975, when she performed the Ralph Siegel composition "Alles geht vorüber" in the German national contest. Again, she was placed second.

In 1979, she experimented with disco on the album Electrifying, but it failed to achieve commercial success. By 1981 EMI did not renew her contract, and she moved back to the United States. In 1984, however, Jermaine Jackson and Pia Zadora achieved a major European hit single with the track "When the Rain Begins to Fall", co-written by March. Although not a hit in the UK or in the US, it went to number one in Germany, France, the Netherlands, and Switzerland. In 1998, the song entered the German Top 10 again when covered by rapper Pappa Bear. The cult film Hairspray featured "I Wish I Were a Princess" in 1988, and a retro fad in Germany brought her some continuing success starting in the mid-1990s with the album Die Freiheit Frau zu sein (1995). Her song "I Will Follow Him" was featured in the 1992 movie Sister Act.

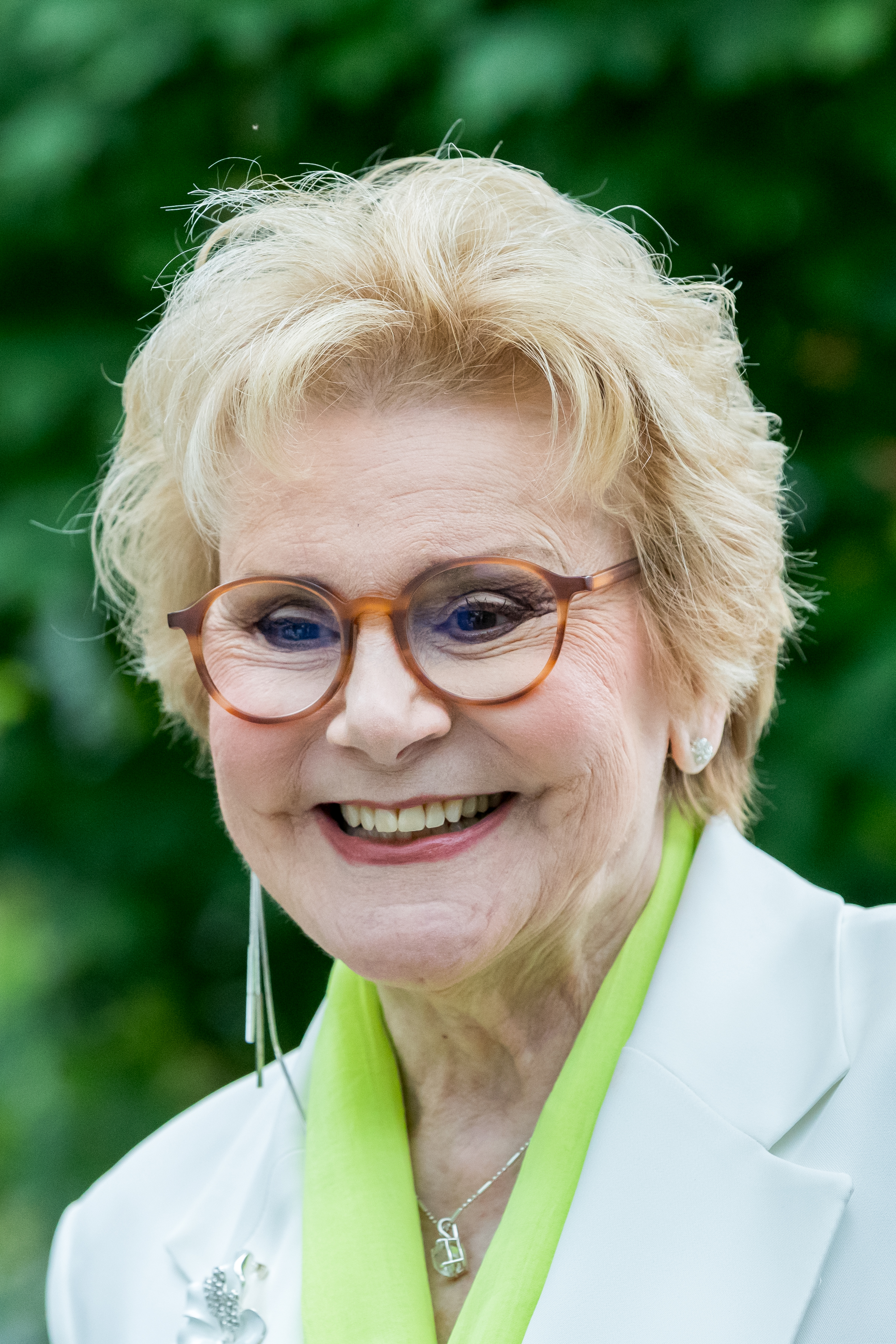
Peggy March in 2024

March currently works largely in Germany and in the Las Vegas music scene and has also performed at Dick Clark's American Bandstand Theater in Branson, Missouri. In 2004, she was the headliner in Riff Markowitz's Fabulous Palm Springs Follies at the Plaza Theater in Palm Springs, California. In 2005, she released an album of standards, Get Happy, followed by the album Meine Liebe ist stark genug (2008).

In March 2010, March went into the recording studio to record her first album of new, original material in English in over 30 years. A collaboration with Scandinavian songwriter and producer Soren Jensen, the album Always and Forever was released on October 13, 2010. It was followed by a special edition for the German-speaking countries in April 2012, including two duets with the Dutch singer José Hoebee, one of them being a cover version of "I Will Follow Him"; which had also been a number one single in the Netherlands and Belgium for Hoebee in 1982 (March further recorded a subsequent recording in 2012 for a 2013 release to commemorate the song's 50th anniversary). March also recorded another version of "When the Rain Begins to Fall" as a duet with the German singer Andreas Zaron.

== Personal life ==
In 1969, March married Arnie Harris, her longtime manager. They had one daughter, Sande Ann, born in 1974. After living in Germany since 1969, March and her husband moved to Florida in 1999. In 2013, Harris died.

== Discography ==
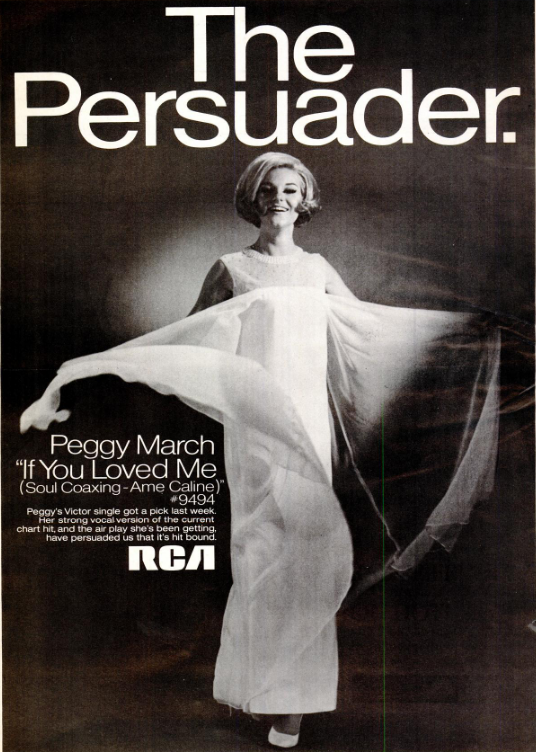
An advertisement for March's 1968 RCA Victor single "If You Loved Me (Soul Coaxing- Ame Caline)"

=== Singles ===
US Singles
Year	Title	Peak Chart Positions							Album
Year	Title	US	GER	AUS	HK	FIN	PER	UK	Album
1962	"Little Me"	—	—	—	—	—	—	—	Non-album single
1963	"I Will Follow Him"	1	6	1	1	2	2	—	I Will Follow Him
1963	"I Wish I Were a Princess"	32	—	—	—	—	—	—	I Will Follow Him
1963	"Hello Heartache, Goodbye Love"	26	—	—	1	—	—	29	Non-album singles
1963	"The Impossible Happened	57	—	—	10	—	—	—	Non-album singles
1963	"(I'm Watching) Every Little Move You Make"	84	—	—	—	—	—	—	Non-album singles
1964	"Leave Me Alone"	—	—	—	—	—	—	—	Non-album singles
1964	"Oh My What a Guy"	—	—	—	10	—	—	—	Non-album singles
1964	"Can't Stop Thinkin' About Him"	—	—	—	—	—	—	—	Non-album singles
1965	"Let Her Go"	—	—	—	—	—	—	—	Non-album singles
1965	"Losin' My Touch"	—	—	—	—	—	—	—	In Our Fashion
1965	"He Couldn't Care Less"	—	—	—	—	—	—	—	Non-album singles
1966	"He's Back Again"	—	—	—	—	—	—	—	Non-album singles
1966	"Try to See It My Way"	—	—	—	—	—	—	—	No Foolin'
1967	"Foolin' Around"	—	—	—	—	—	—	—	No Foolin'
1967	"Your Good Girl's Gonna Go Bad"	—	—	—	—	—	—	—	Non-album singles
1967	"This Heart Wasn't Made to Kick Around"	—	—	—	—	—	—	—	Non-album singles
1968	"If You Loved Me (Soul Coaxing-Ame Caline)"	—	—	—	—	—	—	—	Non-album singles
1969	"Boom Bang-A-Bang"	—	—	—	—	—	—	—	Non-album singles
2013	"I Will Follow Him (50th Anniversary Edition)"	—	—	—	—	—	—	—	Always And Forever

German Singles
Year	Title	GER	Album
1964	"Lady Music"	12	Non-album singles
1964	"Wenn der Silbermond"	15	Non-album singles
1964	"Hallo Boy"	17	Tagebuch Einer 17-jährigen
1964	"Goodbye, Goodbye, Goodbye"	8	Tagebuch Einer 17-jährigen
1965	"Er schoss mir eine Rose"	23	Tagebuch Einer 17-jährigen
1965	"Mit 17 hat man noch Träume"	2	Laß Mir Meine Träume
1965	"Kilindini Docks"	N/A	Non-album single
1965	"Die schönen Stunden gehen schnell vorbei"	25	Tagebuch Einer 17-jährigen
1966	"Tausend Steine" (with Benny Thomas)	—	Laß Mir Meine Träume
1966	"Hundert Jahre und noch mehr"	18	Laß Mir Meine Träume
1966	"Sweetheart, schenk mir einen Ring"	40	Laß Mir Meine Träume
1967	"Memories of Heidelberg"	2	Hello Boys!
1967	"Romeo und Julia"	1	Hello Boys!
1967	"Telegramm aus Tennessee"	15	Hello Boys!
1968	"Canale Grande Number One"	18	Hello Boys!
1968	"Das ist der Musik für mich"	21	Non-album singles
1968	"Mississippi Shuffleboat"	30	Non-album singles
1969	"Yesterday Waltz"	37	Non-album singles
1969	"Hey"	29	Non-album singles
1969	"Bahama Lullabye"	13	Non-album singles
1969	"In der Carnaby Street"	16	Einmal Verliebt - Immer Verliebt
1969	"Mister Giacomo Puccini"	33	Non-album singles
1970	"Vor dem Buckingham Palast"	—	Non-album singles
1970	"Einmal verliebt - immer verliebt"	23	Einmal Verliebt - Immer Verliebt
1970	" Die Maschen der Männer	29	Einmal Verliebt - Immer Verliebt
1970	"Carmen aus Sevilla"	—	Non-album singles
1971	"Sing, wenn du glücklich bist"	35	Non-album singles
1971	"Hallo Partner"	—	Non-album singles
1972	"Ich weiss, ich verlieb mich noch heute in dich"	38	Non-album singles
1972	"Es ist schwer, dich zu vergessen"	30	Für Dich
1976	"Du, mach mich nicht an"	47	Costa Brava
1976	"Costa Brava"	42	Costa Brava
1977	"Fly Away Pretty Flamingo"	8	Fly Away Pretty Flamingo
1978	"Oklahoma Bay"	44	Fly Away Pretty Flamingo
1980	"Dreh' die Uhr zurück zum Anfang"	37	Non-album single

Italian Singles
Year	Title	IT	Album
1964	"Te Ne Vai"/"Così"	1	Little Peggy March
1964	"Passo su Passo/""Carillon"	—	Little Peggy March
1964	"Gli Occhi Tuoi Sono Blu"/"Eh bravo"	—	Little Peggy March
1969	"Che figura ci farei"/"Ci vuole coraggio"	—	Non-album single

=== Albums ===
US Albums
Year	Title	Peak Position
Year	Title	US
1963	I Will Follow Him	139
1965	In Our Fashion (collaboration with Benny Thomas)	—
1967	No Foolin'	—
2005	Get Happy	—
2013	Always And Forever	—
