= Buddy Greco =

American singer and pianist (1926–2017)

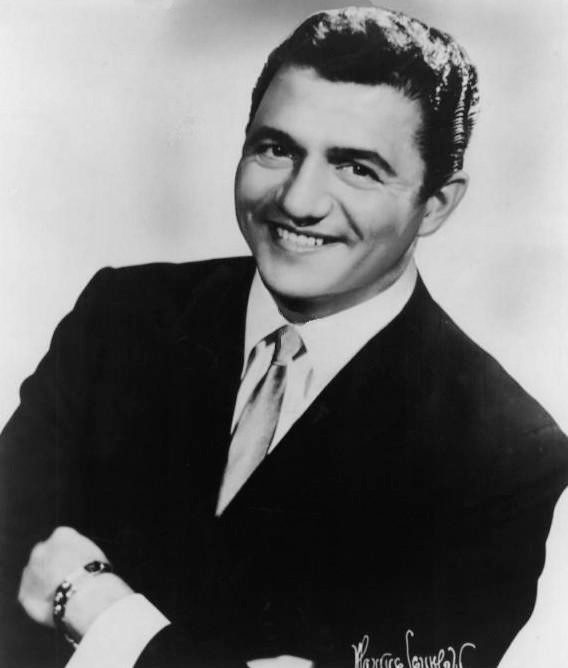
- Greco in 1962

Background information
- Born: Armando Joseph Greco; August 14, 1926; Philadelphia, Pennsylvania, U.S.
- Died: January 10, 2017 (aged 90) Las Vegas, Nevada, U.S.
- Genres: Jazz; dance; traditional pop
- Occupations: Singer; pianist; composer; songwriter
- Instruments: Vocals; piano
- Years active: 1942–2017
- Labels: Bainbridge; Kapp; London; Epic; Fontana; Reprise; Pye
- Website: buddygreco.com

Armando Joseph "Buddy" Greco (August 14, 1926 – January 10, 2017) was an American jazz and pop singer and pianist who had a long career in the US and UK. His recordings have sold millions, including "Oh Look A-There Ain't She Pretty", "Up, Up and Away", and "Around the World". His most successful single was "The Lady Is a Tramp", which sold over one million copies. During his career, he recorded over sixty albums. He conducted the London Symphony Orchestra and performed for Queen Elizabeth II and with the Beatles.

== Music career ==
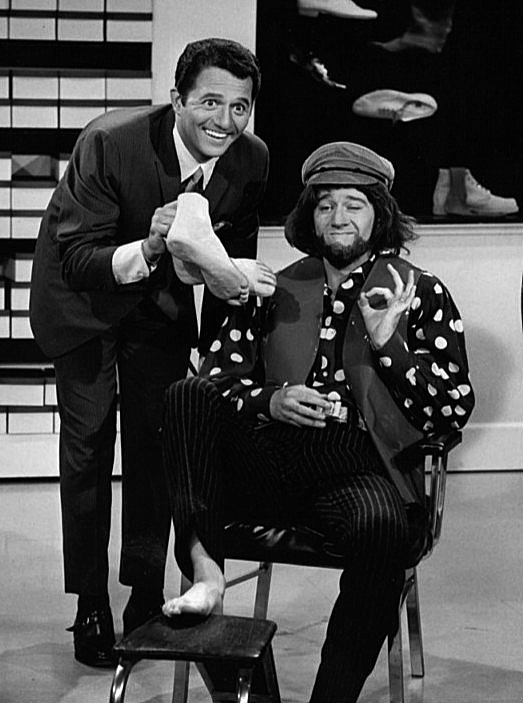
Greco and George Carlin in a skit from Away We Go, 1967

Buddy Greco was born Armando Joseph Greco to an Italian-American family in Philadelphia, Pennsylvania. He was the son of Giuseppe "Joseph" Greco and Carmela Greco (born Piedimonte), who was originally from Ripabottoni in Molise, Italy. His mother introduced him to piano at age four. As a child he sang on the radio, and as a teen performed in nightclubs in Philadelphia. At age 16, he was hired by bandleader Benny Goodman and spent four years touring internationally with the Goodman orchestra, playing piano, singing, and arranging. In 1951, Greco started his recording career, signing with labels such as Coral, Kapp, Epic, and Reprise.

In 1967, he hosted the CBS television series Away We Go with comedian George Carlin. Guests included Buddy Rich and Carmen McRae. He also appeared in the film The Girl Who Knew Too Much. In 1969, he formed a duo with jazz guitarist Ron Escheté. Also that year he released the single, "From Atlanta to Goodbye" bw "Love is a Hurtin' Thing" on Scepter Records. It was reviewed in the 20 September issue of Cash Box. The reviewer said that the single could grab some teen attention and that there was some Top 40 potential.

=== Las Vegas and Palm Springs ===
Greco met his fifth and last wife, Lezlie Anders, while she was performing in Las Vegas. Working as his supporting act, she met Greco on the stage of the Desert Inn. After marrying, they worked and toured together. In 1992, he performed in Las Vegas at the Starlight Room at Stars' Desert Inn. This engagement ushered in the second phase of his career. The following year, he was added to the Philadelphia Music Alliance's Walk of Fame. Shortly after, he toured Italy, France, Australia, and England.

While living in Palm Springs, Greco opened a small club. The walls were decorated with pictures of Greco, the Rat Pack, and other celebrity friends. He performed there often, and it became a popular place for celebrities to dine. After the club closed, he moved to England. While living in Palm Desert, California, he continued to appear at his club in Cathedral City, California, until it closed in August 2009.

In 2004, he and Anders were headliners with The Fabulous Palm Springs Follies at the Plaza Theatre in Palm Springs, California.

=== Life in Britain ===
Greco became acquainted with Great Britain in 1949. He spent many years performing in Britain's clubs. He moved to Essex, keeping his Palm Springs, California, property as a vacation home. In 2008, he and Anders toured the UK. They performed with the BBC Big Band and at Ronnie Scott's Jazz Club in London. In August of that year, he was the first Las Vegas headliner to star at a British casino when he performed at the Circus Casino, Star City, Birmingham. In April 2010, he performed a tribute to Frank Sinatra for BBC Radio 2 with the 42-piece BBC Concert Orchestra. He toured the UK with the Swinging Las Vegas Legends show beginning in July 2010.

In 2010, Greco and his wife produced the stage show Fever! The Music of Miss Peggy Lee, which met with critical acclaim at its London West End opening. Greco played piano and conducted the orchestra while Anders sang. The show received positive reviews in the U.S. On New Year's Eve 2011, he made a guest appearance at Hootenanny hosted by Jools Holland, singing "Fly Me to the Moon".

In 2012, he toured the UK in smaller venues, including Thameside Theatre Stage, and The Broadway in Essex.

Greco died on January 10, 2017, in Las Vegas, Nevada, at the age of 90.

Greco had an album released by Scepter which Tom Murray of the Calgary Herald referred to 48 years later as "a strange and beautiful mutant of its time". The album was Let the Sunshine In. It included the songs "Let the Sunshine In", "Everybody Gets to Go to the Moon", "You're My World", "Spinning Wheel", "Never Give You Up", and "Like a Rolling Stone".

== Awards and honors ==
- Inductee, Walk of Fame, Philadelphia Music Alliance
- Appears in Encyclopedia of Great Musicians and the Encyclopedia of Great Jazz Singers and Musicians
- Inducted into the Grand Order of Water Rats in 2011

== Discography ==
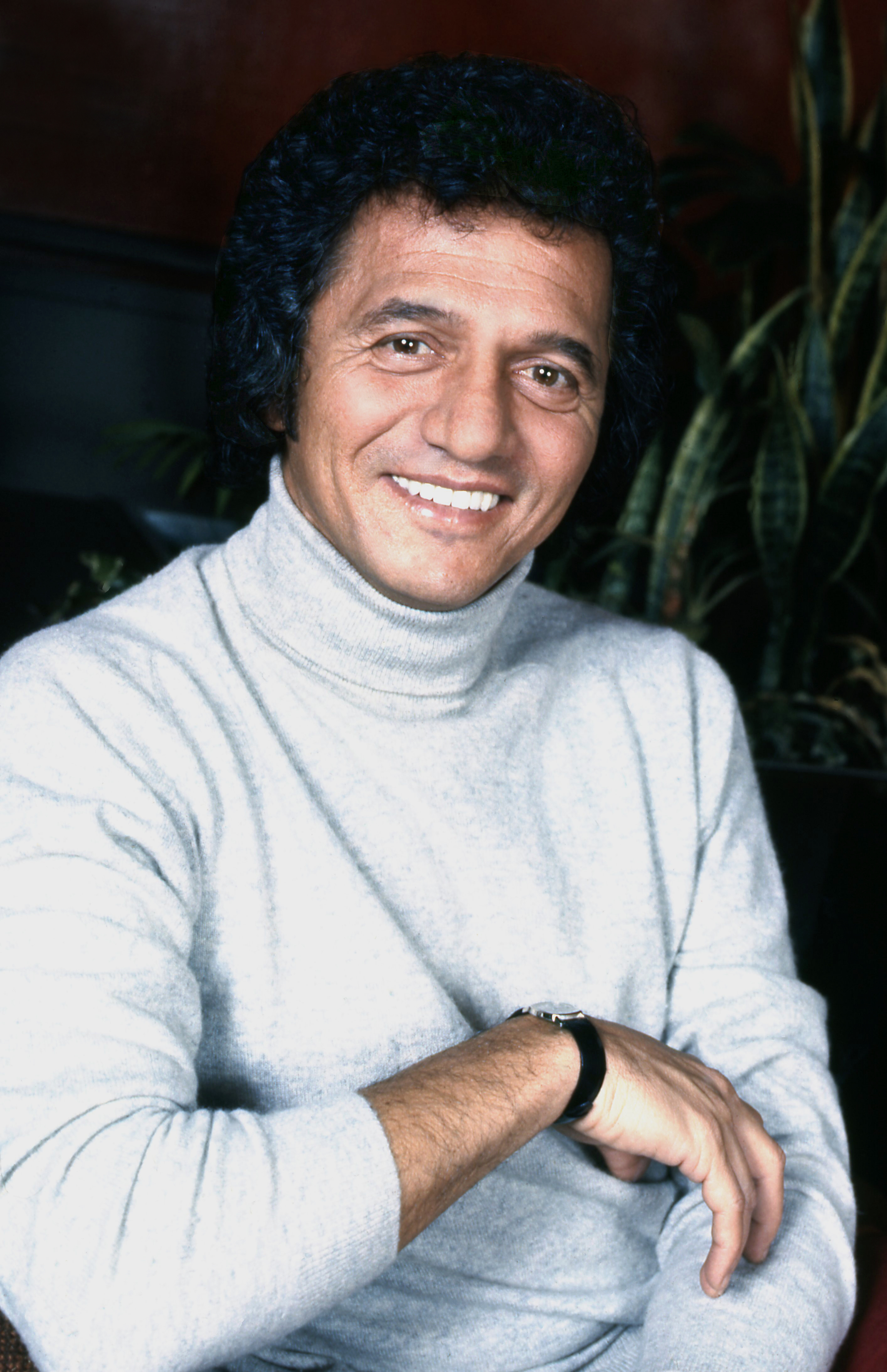
Buddy Greco, by Allan Warren

=== As leader ===
- Buddy Greco at Mister Kelly's (Coral, 1956)
- Broadway Melodies (Kapp, 1956)
- My Buddy (Fontana, 1959)
- Let's Love (Epic, 1961)
- I Like It Swinging (Columbia, 1961)
- Songs for Swinging Losers (Epic, 1961)
- Buddy & Soul (Epic, 1962)
- Soft and Gentle (Epic, 1963)
- Buddy's Back in Town (Columbia, 1963)
- Sings for Intimate Moments with Dave Grusin (Epic, 1963)
- My Last Night in Rome (Epic, 1964)
- Modern Sounds of Hank Williams (Epic, 1964)
- Here's Buddy Greco (Vocalion, 1964)
- On Stage (Epic, 1964)
- From the Wrists Down (Epic, 1965)
- I Love a Piano (Columbia, 1965)
- Buddy Greco Sings and Plays with the Hollywood All Stars (Society, 1965)
- Big Band & Ballads (Reprise, 1966)
- Buddy's in a Brand New Bag (Reprise, 1966)
- Away We Go! (Reprise, 1966)
- Let the Sunshine In (Scepter, 1969)
- It's My Life (Pye, 1972)
- Movin' On (Pye, 1973)
- Buddy Greco Live (Pye, 1974)
- For Once in My Life (Project 3, 1979)
- Live at the Sands (Picc-a-Dilly, 1980)
- Hot Nights (Applause, 1982)
- Ready for Your Love (Bainbridge, 1984)
- Movin' On (USA Music, 1989)
- It's Magic (Prestige, 1990)
- 'Round Midnight (Bay Cities, 1992)
- Route 66 (Celebrity, 1994)
- In Style (Camden, 1996)
- Jazz Grooves (Candid, 1998)

=== Singles ===
Year	Title	Chart positions	
Year	Title	US	US AC
1947	"Ooh! Look-A There, Ain't She Pretty"	15	—
1951	"I Ran All the Way Home"	30	—
1960	"The Lady Is a Tramp"^{A}	—	—
1961	"Around the World"	109	—
1962	"Mr. Lonely"	64	—
1965	"That Darn Cat"	—	36
1965	"I Can't Begin to Tell You"	132	27
1966	"Put Yourself in My Place"	—	24
1966	"Walking on New Grass"	—	21
1967	"Love's Gonna Live Here Again"	—	19
1967	"There She Goes"	—	14
1972	"From Atlanta to Goodbye"	—	34

- ^{A} "The Lady Is a Tramp" peaked at No. 26 in UK Singles charts.

== Works ==
- Buddy Greco 500 Super Song Book: The World's Greatest Hits for Chord Playing New York, New York: Charles Hansen 1977 ISBN 0849401348 ISBN 9780849401343
