= Leonard Crofoot =

American singer, actor and dancer

Leonard John Crofoot (born September 20, 1948, in Utica, New York) is an actor, singer, dancer, writer and choreographer.

Crofoot has performed extensively on Broadway. His appearances include his Drama-League Critics Award-winning role of "Tom Thumb" in Barnum (1980) and in the original Broadway shows The Happy Time (1968), Come Summer (1969), Grind (1985) and Gigi (1973) and as replacement in American Dance Machine (1978). Crofoot toured with Carol Channing in Hello, Dolly! (1978) in the role of "Barnaby" and played the role of "Benjamin" in Joseph and the Amazing Technicolor Dreamcoat in its American debut at the Brooklyn Academy of Music. He can be heard singing "Bigger Isn't Better" on the original cast album of Barnum and on the CD Broadway Scene Stealers: The Men a compilation of performances, edited by Playbill.

Crofoot wrote and performed his one-person show Nijinsky Speaks from 1996 to 2006. The show originated at the Tuacahn Center in Utah and then played in Los Angeles at the Getty Center, Off-Broadway at the Harold Clurman Theatre in New York and toured theaters and universities around the country. The show was nominated for five Lester Horton Awards, the 8th Annual Ticket Holder Award: runner up for best new play and the California Arts Council Performing Arts Touring and Presenting Program 2001–2003. The show received critical acclaim, most notably from John Simon at New York Magazine who wrote "See this show! No ordinary show, I repeat! More goes on here than in many a populous superproduction."

He has appeared three times on Star Trek. On Star Trek: The Next Generation he appeared on "Angel One" (1988) as "Trent" and in "The Offspring" (1990) as an asexual android covered in full-body make-up. Crofoot also appeared in the Star Trek: Voyager episode, "Virtuoso."

Crofoot's other television appearances include CSI, Six Feet Under, a Jenny Craig commercial with Kirstie Alley and as guest star on Saved by the Bell as Eddie in the episode "All in the Mall". He has danced on the 50th and 67th Academy Awards with a recreation of Donald O'Connor's famous flip on the 69th and recently on A.N.T. Farm, Two and a Half Men and a stunt on The Tonight Show with Jay Leno.

Movie credits include A Reflection of Fear, Echoes, Two Shades of Blue, The Man Who Wasn't There and The Singing Detective (2003).

Crofoot performed with The Fabulous Palm Springs Follies from 2006 to 2010 at the historic Plaza Theatre in downtown Palm Springs, California. He is extensively interviewed in The Dancer Within, Intimate Conversations with Great Dancers. Mr. Crofoot lives in Culver City with his companion Robin Palanker and their dog, Zou Zou.
