= The Fabulous Palm Springs Follies =

Former Ziegfeld Follies style dance and musical review show

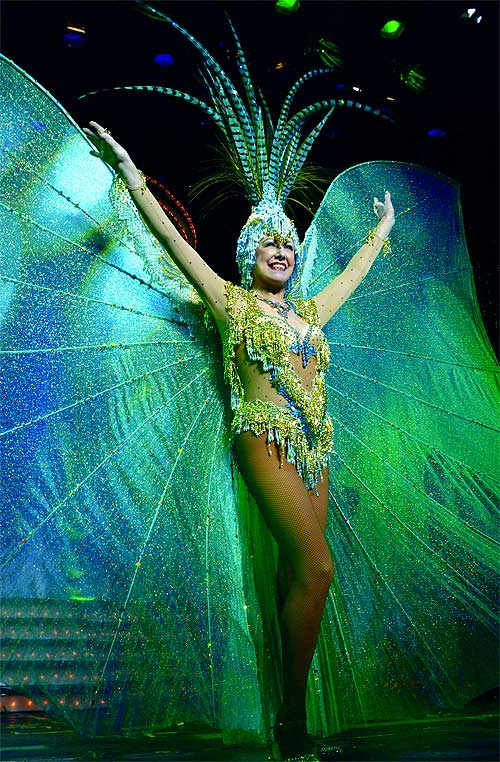
Dorothy Kloss performing at The Fabulous Palm Springs Follies

The Fabulous Palm Springs Follies was a Ziegfeld Follies style dance and musical review show that played at the historic Plaza Theatre in Palm Springs, California, United States, seasonally from November to mid-May. The Follies was founded in 1990 by Riff Markowitz and Mary Jardin. Impresario Markowitz also served as the show's managing director and emcee. The show was often credited with helping to revitalize and maintain the downtown area by bringing in patrons from around the globe. The Follies was unique in that it only featured performers 55 and older and holds Guinness World Records for this claim to fame. It was the subject of a short documentary titled Still Kicking: The Fabulous Palm Springs Follies which was nominated at the 70th Academy Awards for Best Short Subject Documentary. A segment that aired on Seattle television station KOMO-TV that featured the Follies received an Emmy in 1997. The shows attracted approximately 170,000 attendees yearly. On June 5, 2013, co-founders Markowitz and Jardin announced they would close the Follies on May 18, 2014.

== Performers ==
The Follies had a cast of both featured and guest performers.

Featured Follies performers included:

- Guinness Book of Records "World's Oldest Still Performing Showgirl" (at age 87) Beverly Allen
- Original Broadway West Side Story cast member Hank Brunjes
- Actor, singer, dancer, writer and choreographer Leonard Crofoot
- Broadway musical Dreamgirls cast member Stephanie Eley
- Dancer Randy Doney, who performed with Mitzi Gaynor
- Popular singer Gogi Grant
- Dancer and showgirl Dorothy Kloss
- Bud and James Mercer, long time vaudeville performers and musicians
- Sitcom Blansky's Beauties cast member Jill Owens
- Broadway and television actress Kit Smythe
- Dancer, skater, entertainer Lou De Grado
- Dancer and former Radio City Rockette Ann Murphy
- Legendary dancer, choreographer and actress Sylvia Lewis

Guest performers (headliners) included:

- Brad Cummings and Rex – a comedic ventriloquist variety act (2011–2012)
- John Davidson – singer and comedian (2011–12)
- The Diamonds – a Canadian Doo-Wop quartet (2011–12)
- Maureen McGovern – singer and Broadway actress (2011–12)

Headliners included:

- Anna Maria Alberghetti – operatic singer and actress
- Kaye Ballard – actress, comedian and singer
- The Four Aces – male pop music quartet
- Buddy Greco and spouse Lezlie Anders – singer and pianist; singer
- Howard Keel – actor and singer
- Frankie Laine – singer, songwriter and actor
- Carol Lawrence - singer, actor, dancer and Broadway star
- Peggy March – pop singer
- Peter Marshall – television and radio personality, actor and singer
- Barbara McNair – singer and actress
- The Mills Brothers – jazz and pop vocal quartet
- The Modernaires – vocal group
- Donald O'Connor – dancer, singer and actor
- Trina Parks – actress, vocalist, choreographer, and dancer; known for playing "Thumper" in Diamonds are Forever
- Kay Starr – pop and jazz singer
- Ralph Young – of singing team Sandler and Young

== Production ==
Musician Johnny Harris served as the conductor for the entire run of the show.

Connie Furr Soloman served as the primary costume designer for seasons 11–16.
