= Hello Heartache, Goodbye Love =

Single by Little Peggy March
- B-side: "Boy Crazy"
- Released: August 1963
- Recorded: July 2, 1963
- Genre: Pop
- Length: 2:22
- Label: RCA Victor
- Songwriter(s): Hugo Peretti; Luigi Creatore; George David Weiss
- Producer(s): Hugo & Luigi

Little Peggy March singles chronology
"I Wish I Were a Princess" (1963)	"Hello Heartache, Goodbye Love" (1963)	"The Impossible Happened" (1963)

"Hello Heartache, Goodbye Love" is a popular song written by Hugo & Luigi and George David Weiss. The song was a 1963 international hit for Little Peggy March, hitting the top of the charts in Hong Kong, peaking at No. 26 on the Billboard Hot 100 in the United States, and reaching No. 29 on the UK Singles Chart. March herself recorded an Italian version, too, with the title "Te ne vai " ("You're going").

== Charts ==
Chart (1963)	Peak position
Hong Kong	1
UK Singles Chart	29
US Billboard Hot 100	26
