= KSPS-TV =

Television station in Spokane, Washington

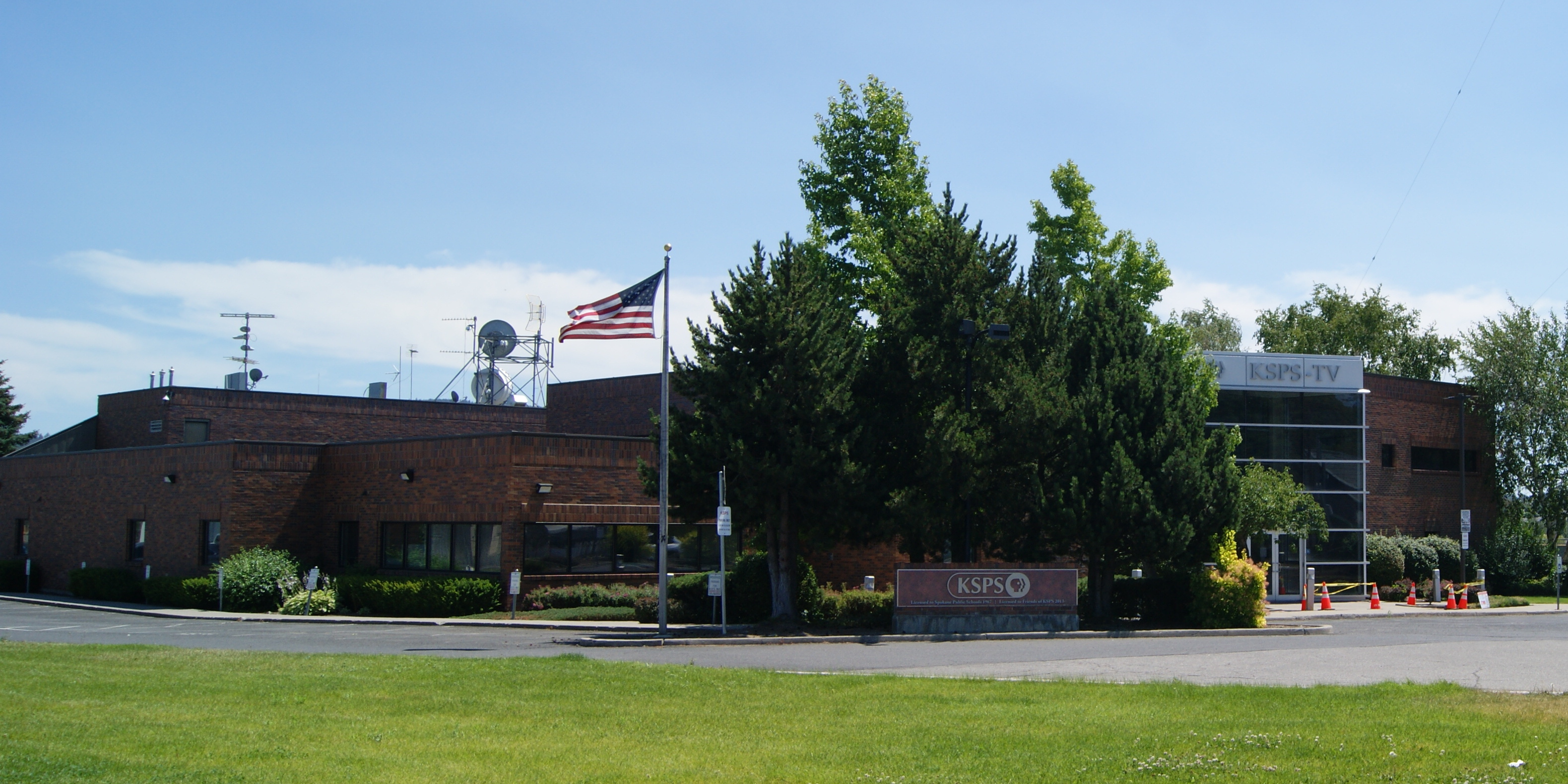
- The station's studio
- Spokane, Washington; Coeur d'Alene, Idaho; United States
- City: Spokane, Washington
- Channels: Digital: 7 (VHF); Virtual: 7
- Branding: KSPS PBS

Programming
- Affiliations: 7.1: PBS; for others, see § Subchannels

Ownership
- Owner: Friends of KSPS

History
- First air date: April 24, 1967
- Former call signs: KSHD (CP, 1964–1966)
- Former channel numbers: Analog: 7 (VHF, 1967–2009); Digital: 8 (VHF, 2004–2009)
- Former affiliations: NET (1967–1970)
- Call sign meaning: Spokane Public Schools, original licensee

Technical information
- Licensing authority: FCC
- Facility ID: 61956
- ERP: 45.1 kW
- HAAT: 558 m (1,831 ft)
- Transmitter coordinates: 47°34′34″N 117°18′2″W

Links
- Public license information: Public file; LMS
- Website: www.ksps.org

KSPS-TV (channel 7), branded as KSPS PBS, is a community-licensed PBS member television station in Spokane, Washington, United States. The station's studios are located on the campus of Joel E. Ferris High School on South Regal Street in the Southgate neighborhood of Spokane, and its transmitter is located on Krell Hill southeast of Spokane. A network of translators and carriage on cable television systems extends the station's reach into western Montana, northern Idaho, central Washington, and the Canadian province of Alberta.

KSPS-TV began broadcasting on April 24, 1967, as a service of its namesake, Spokane Public Schools. It aired locally produced daytime educational programs and evening programming from National Educational Television, forerunner to PBS. KSPS was the first educational station available to viewers in Alberta—Canadian viewers have historically represented about half of the station's contributions and revenue—and western Montana, which did not yet have an in-state service. Educational programming shifted off channel 7 in 1981, when the station cut local programming in response to budget cuts. In 1987, the station began production of Sit and Be Fit, an exercise series that went on to national distribution in its 35-year run.

Over time, the station grew more distant from the school board, and in 2013 KSPS was separated from Spokane Public Schools and spun off to Friends of KSPS, its fundraising arm. The station produces local public affairs, health and arts programming for the Spokane area.

== History ==
=== Early years ===
Though channel 7 had been assigned for use by an educational TV station in Spokane, Washington, it was still unused by 1960, when Spokane Public Schools superintendent W. C. Sorenson reported that it was still available for the district to use and a committee was gathering information. On December 13, 1961, the school board voted to permit planning activities for a television station, which was projected to cover areas of eastern Washington, northern Idaho, and western Montana. In the meantime, some educational programming, such as a 15-minute course in German, aired on Spokane's commercial stations. In 1963, the school board sent an application to the Federal Communications Commission (FCC) for the new station. A year later, after receiving a federal grant for funds to construct the facility, the commission granted the construction permit.

KHQ-TV offered use of its tower site, and a studio was planned for construction at Joel E. Ferris High School. The original call sign assigned to the permit was KSHD; the school board was unhappy with this designation and sought to change it. Among the three suggestions the board sent to the FCC was KSPS, for Spokane Public Schools.

On April 24, 1967, KSPS-TV first signed on the air with a program on economics. The station aired daytime educational programming and evening programming from National Educational Television (NET). The early local educational programs were in black and white to reduce the costs of production and outfitting the schools with television sets. KSPS rapidly grew its broadcasting output; by September, it was on the air for 15 hours a day on weekdays, later launching evening telecasts on Saturday and Sunday. The next year, it acquired an amplifier from KTTS-TV in Springfield, Missouri, to increase its power and coverage area.

As an educational station, KSPS-TV's geographic scope was crimped by a decision made years prior. The microwave transmission company that provided television signals to many Central Washington towns such as Yakima, Moses Lake, and the Tri-Cities was already providing the educational programming of KCTS-TV in Seattle, and the school systems in those areas were already paying per-student fees to KCTS. In 1970, PBS replaced the NET network. In 1972, Friends of Seven was founded to provide community financial support to the station amid budget cuts stemming from a failed school levy vote.

=== From educational to public ===
Another budget cut crisis at Spokane Public Schools caused KSPS to lose $400,000 from its budget in 1981. As a result, the station began holding pledge drives and dropped the remaining educational programming from its broadcast schedule; these programs were instead provided on cable channels. The station went from producing regular public affairs shows to only several hours a month of local programming. Friends of Seven began several campaigns that increased the station's membership base and were recognized with national awards. After the cuts, the station's primary local program was the Northwest Profiles series. In 1995, the station built a 17,000-square-foot (1,600 m^{2}) expansion to its studio building.

On November 29, 2006, ice and wind caused the top 200 feet (61 meters) of the station's antenna at the Krell Hill transmission site to collapse, disrupting its over-the-air signal though the station was still fed directly to cable systems. A temporary antenna was installed within two weeks to restore service in most of the coverage area. The mast was rebuilt to its full height in November 2007, during which time KSPS was unavailable to antenna users.

=== Transition to community licensee ===
Over time, the relationship between Spokane Public Schools and the operation of KSPS became indirect as the board focused on running the school system. By 2009, Friends of Seven (renamed Friends of KSPS in 2010) was the primary support vehicle for KSPS, though Spokane Public Schools contributed about $300,000 a year to the station. In comparison, Friends of Seven had contributed $15 million over a decade to KSPS operations. Only five public television stations were still owned by school districts as stations were spun off for financial reasons. The imbalance led the school system to consider spinning out KSPS; a study found that the move could increase the station's cash flow. On July 26 and 27, 2012, the boards of Spokane Public Schools and Friends of KSPS voted unanimously to approve the transfer. The transfer was finalized in September 2013 after receiving FCC approval, and Gary Stokes was named general manager to replace Claude Kistler, who retired after 33 years as manager and 46 with the station.

Stokes retired in 2025. That year, the rescission by Congress of federal funding for public broadcasting cut 18 percent of the station's budget, resulting in six layoffs and pay cuts for six other employees. Several local programs were shifted to produce fewer episodes. Other federal impacts, including antagonism towards Canada, affected donations by KSPS's Canadian audience.

== Coverage outside of the Spokane area ==
=== Alberta ===
In 1971, Alberta Government Telephones (AGT) completed construction of a microwave link that brought the KSPS-TV signal to cable television systems in Calgary and Edmonton. Service was extended to Lethbridge in 1977. Alberta became a significant share of KSPS's viewer and donor base. In 1988, 62 percent of KSPS's individual donations and 40 percent of its corporate support originated from Alberta viewers and businesses. Albertans were on KSPS's board of directors, and the station printed a program guide with Mountain Time schedules for its Alberta audience. By 2009, Canadian contributions represented 51 to 52 percent of KSPS's support.

In 1983, Edmonton cable company QCTV and several Calgary cable systems sought to move KSPS to a higher channel that required a converter box to view, threatening the station's contribution base. Later in the decade, CANCOM fought to take over the provision of American network service from AGT, which might have led to Detroit and Seattle network affiliates supplanting KSPS in Alberta, depriving the station of a critical source of revenue.

=== Montana ===
In 1970, Flathead Valley Community College built a UHF translator to provide KSPS-TV programming to Kalispell, Montana. The signal was also sent by further repeaters to cable systems serving Missoula. Schools in the area served by the translator, such as Libby, experimented with the use of KSPS-TV's educational programming. (There was no standalone educational television station within Montana until KUSM in Bozeman began in 1984.) KSPS was removed from Missoula cable in 1981 and restored in 1986, with a new microwave link upgrading the quality of the signal fed to Kalispell. In 1993, KSPS opened a UHF translator in Missoula.

In 2012, Time Warner Cable in Kalispell and Missoula removed KSPS from its lineup to add Montana PBS, citing a desire to offer local and in-state services. In addition, KSPS had not been available in high definition but Montana PBS was. At the time, KSPS had 1,100 members in western Montana.

== Local programming ==
=== Sit and Be Fit ===
In 1987, KSPS began producing Sit and Be Fit, an exercise program aimed at seniors and wheelchair users hosted by Mary Ann Wilson. Wilson, who had taught chair exercise classes at local senior centers, wrote KSPS suggesting the series be adapted to television. The first series of 30 episodes, put together within two weeks, was distributed to 34 stations, ensuring a renewal. Within five years, it was airing on 50 to 60 public stations nationally, and by 2014 it aired on more than 220 stations. Sit and Be Fit remained in production through Wilson's retirement in 2023, at the age of 85.

=== Other local programming ===
Other local programs from KSPS include a series of features on local life and history, Northwest Profiles; Inland Sessions, recordings of local music and dance performances; the weekly hosted film series Saturday Night Cinema; At Issue, a public affairs series; and Health Matters, a health education program.

== Funding ==
In fiscal year 2025, KSPS received revenue of $7,135,509, accounting for currency exchange loss from its Canadian contributions. Roughly 70% of funding came from individual contributions and bequests. The Corporation for Public Broadcasting, in its final year, contributed $1,264,779 (17.7%) of the budget.

== Technical information ==
=== Subchannels ===
KSPS-TV's transmitter is located on Krell Hill. The station's signal is multiplexed:

Subchannels of KSPS-TV
Subchannel	Res.	Short name	Programming
7.1	1080i	KSPS-HD	PBS
7.2	480i	KSPS Wo	World
7.3	720p	KSPS Cr	Create
7.4	480i	KIDS	PBS Kids

=== Analog-to-digital conversion ===
KSPS-TV began broadcasting a digital signal in 2004. It ended regular programming on its analog signal, over VHF channel 7, on February 17, 2009, the original digital television transition date. The station's digital signal relocated from its pre-transition VHF channel 8 (where its digital signal was originally slated to remain post-transition) to channel 7.

=== Translators ===
A network of translators rebroadcasts KSPS-TV's signal into parts of eastern Washington, northern Idaho, and western Montana. Some transmitters do not broadcast all subchannels.

==== Montana ====
- Big Arm, Elmo: K08PQ-D
- Ferndale (Big Fork): K21KA-D (Note: KSPS lists this transmitter as carrying all KSPS subchannels. RabbitEars lists it as carrying KSPS 7.1 and KUFM 11.1.)
- Kalispell (Blacktail Mountain): K32HH-D
- Libby (Sheldon Mountain): K30MJ-D
- Missoula (TV Mountain): K08PR-D
- Polson: K29LQ-D (Note: KSPS lists this transmitter as carrying all KSPS subchannels. RabbitEars lists it as carrying KSPS 7.1 plus KREM 2.1, KXLY-TV 4.1, and KAYU 28.1.)
- Thompson Falls: K36BW-D (Note: KSPS lists this transmitter as carrying all KSPS subchannels. RabbitEars lists it as carrying KSPS 7.1 on 4.4 plus other services, including KXLY-TV 4.1.)
- Troy (King Mountain): K13KV-D (Note: KSPS lists this transmitter as carrying all KSPS subchannels. RabbitEars lists it as carrying KHQ-TV.)
- Woods Bay: K11KE-D

==== Idaho ====
- Bonners Ferry (Black Mountain): K32HA-D
- Coeur d'Alene (Canfield–Butte Mountain): K26LJ-D
- Coolin: K05GL-D (Kinner Point Mountain) and K31DS-D (Lakeview Mountain)
- Cottonwood–Grangeville (Butte Mountain): K26CK-D
- Lewiston (Lewiston Hill): K24JN-D
- Sandpoint (Baldy Mountain): K23NM-D

==== Oregon ====
- Milton-Freewater (Basket Mountain): K23FH-D

==== Washington ====
- Baker Flats Area (Wenatchee, Jump Off Mountain): K32MC-D
- Brewster & Pateros (Goat Mountain): K14SF-D or K34NN-D (Note: KSPS says 14, which RabbitEars lists as carrying KXLY-TV.)
- Bridgeport: K23MU-D or K24LM-D (Note: KSPS says 24, which RabbitEars lists as carrying KAYU-TV.)
- Cashmere: K09ES-D
- Chelan–Butte Mountain: K07JO-D
- Colville (Gold Hill): K09UP-D (7.1 only) (Note: KSPS says this transmitter broadcasts 7.1 and 7.3; RabbitEars says it broadcasts 7.1. Shared with KAYU-TV, which owns it.)
- Coulee City: K10RA-D
- Leavenworth: K13IY-D
- Malott–Wakefield (Fox Mountain): K12CW-D
- Mazama: K17KR-D
- Methow: K11BM-D or K09BI-D (Note: KSPS says 9, which RabbitEars lists as carrying KHQ-TV.)
- Omak (Omak Mountain): K17EV-D
- Riverside (Olive Mountain): K12CV-D or K08CY-D (Note: KSPS says 8, which RabbitEars lists as carrying KAYU-TV.)
- Moses Lake (Monument Mountain): K19NN-D (Note: KSPS says this transmitter broadcasts 7.1 through 7.4. RabbitEars says it broadcasts 7.1 through 7.3. Shared with KXLY-TV, which owns it.)
- Tonasket (Pickens Mountain): K08CX-D
- Winthrop–Twisp (McClure Mountain): K13BA-D or K08AY-D (Note: KSPS says 8, which RabbitEars lists as carrying KHQ-TV.)
