= Dorothy Kloss =

American dancer (1923–2026)

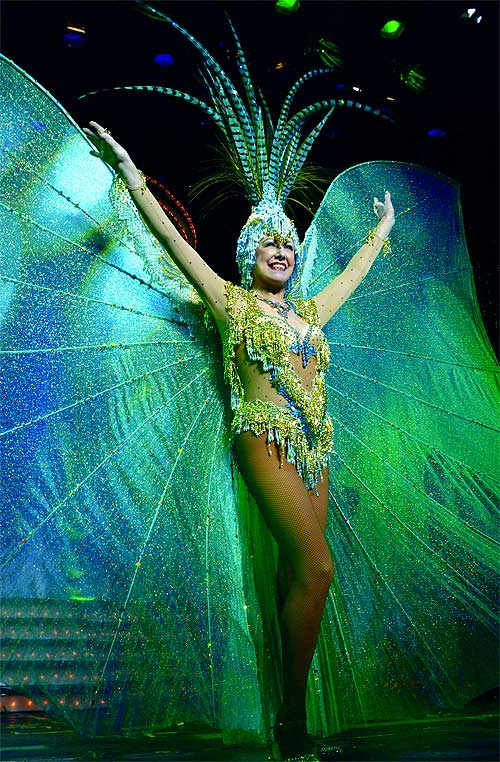
Kloss performing at the Fabulous Palm Springs Follies

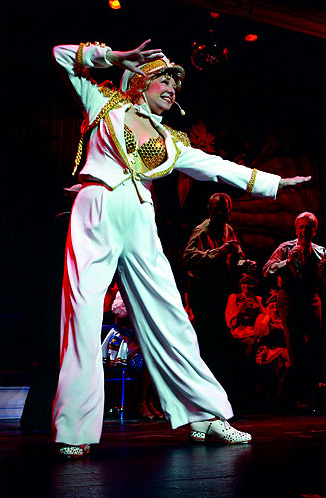
Kloss performing at the Fabulous Palm Springs Follies

Dorothy Dale Kloss (October 27, 1923 – August 19, 2026) was an American dancer.

== Life and career ==
Kloss began dancing when she was three years old. While working with a young Bob Fosse in a Chicago class, she won a tap dance contest and soon gained her own act at the Empire Room in Chicago. She toured the country and played Mexico City with actor Cantinflas.

She toured with Eddy Duchin until his orchestra was drafted during World War II, and then performed for the USO. In 1946 she became the hostess and dance instructor of television shows, broadcasting out of Chicago on WBKB.

Kloss performed with Liberace, The Mills Brothers, Mel Tormé, Harry Richman, Howard Keel, Kay Starr, Frankie Laine, and Chico Marx. She was accompanied by such bands as Ray Noble, Skinnay Ennis, Shep Fields and his "Rippling Rhythm", to name a few.

She performed at the Plaza Theatre in Palm Springs, California, with The Fabulous Palm Springs Follies, a dance and musical revue where she was a regular "Long-Legged Lovely", performing in ten shows weekly until May 2010. Soon after, she was awarded a star on the Palm Springs Walk of Stars.

In 2013, Kloss's autobiography entitled I'm Not in Kansas Anymore: Love Dorothy was published by Bear Manor Media (ISBN 978-1593932329).

Kloss died at her home on August 19, 2026, at the age of 102.
