= Plaza Theatre (Palm Springs, California) =

Historic venue in Riverside County, California

Coordinates: 33.8226°N 116.5465°W

The historic Plaza Theatre, 1951

The Plaza Theatre is a historic theater located at 128 South Palm Canyon Drive in Palm Springs, California. It is an anchor of La Plaza (a.k.a. Palm Springs Plaza), a streetside collection of shops, one of the first planned shopping centers in Southern California, opened in 1936. From 1990 through 2014 the theatre housed The Fabulous Palm Springs Follies which was featured on ABC's 20/20, The Today Show, the New York Times, NPR and other media since its founding. There is currently a fundraising campaign to raise money to restore the historic building to its former glory and make it a theater that meets theatrical needs for today and tomorrow.

== History ==
Earle Strebe, sold the very first ticket to Annette Freeman

It was December 12, 1936 that the historic Plaza Theatre opened with the Greta Garbo and Robert Taylor premiere Camille. The theatre's owner at the time, Earle C. Strebe, sold the very first ticket to Annette Freeman.

The Plaza Theatre became a venue for a number of world premieres, including the musicals My Fair Lady and Music Man. The Plaza was a popular theater during the 1940s for famous stars to do their broadcasting. Jack Benny, Bob Hope, and Amos 'n' Andy all did radio shows from the Plaza, bringing national attention to Palm Springs.

— Greg Niemann

In the early days of Palm Springs began the "Desert Circus" for which an annual show was staged by Melba Bennett called the "Village Insanities". Originally performed on the grounds of the Desert Inn, the "Insanities" would later perform at the Plaza Theatre under the name of the Village Vanities during the 1940s.

The Plaza Theatre remained active for many years, finally becoming dormant in 1989. It was at this time that television producer Riff Markowitz (The Hitchhiker), decided to renovate the cinema and create a "Broadway-caliber celebration of the music, dance, and comedy of the 30s, 40s, and 50s with a cast old enough to have lived it!".

== Follies era ==
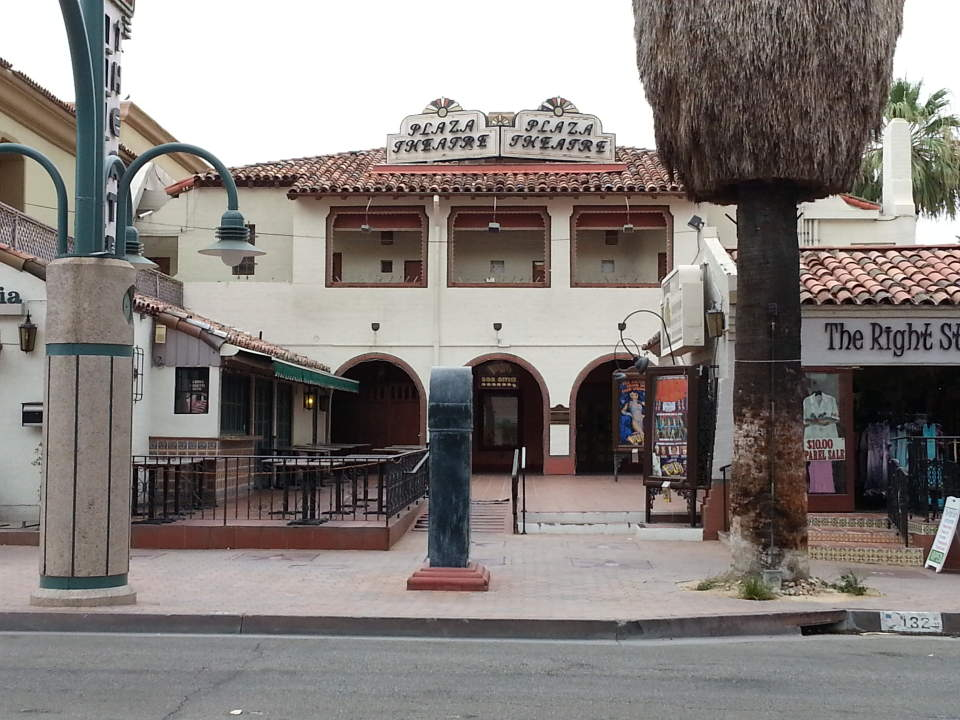
The theater seen in 2012

The Fabulous Palm Springs Follies ran late October through May from 1990 to 2014. The Managing Director and MC of the show, Riff Markowitz, is known for his cult classic television series The Hilarious House of Frightenstein and the HBO TV series The Hitchhiker. Among the theatre's stars were Dorothy Kloss, "the World's Oldest Showgirl", Leonard Crofoot, often remembered for his roles on Star Trek The Next Generation and Star Trek Voyager, and Markowitz himself.

The Plaza Theatre was the subject of a documentary, through the Follies, entitled Still Kicking: The Fabulous Palm Springs Follies, directed by Mel Damski, which was nominated for an Oscar in 1998.

The Follies held their last show in May 2014.

== Restoration project ==
Plans have been in the works to restore and reopen the Plaza Theater for several years. An official campaign, Save The Plaza Theatre, was launched in 2019, but was paused during the initial impacts of the COVID-19 pandemic.

In October 2021, former Frasier producer David Lee announced a $5 million donation to the fund drive. An anonymous donor also contributed an additional $2 million to the project.

The Plaza Theatre is owned by the City of Palm Springs and the restoration project is managed by the Palm Springs Plaza Theatre Foundation, a 501(c)(3) organization headed by JR Roberts. Restoration of the iconic building is set to begin in the summer of 2023.
