= Sit and Be Fit =

American exercise television series

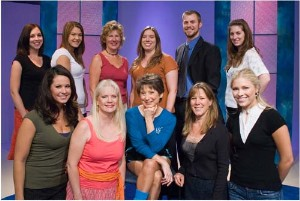
- Genre: Fitness
- Created by: Mary Ann Wilson
- Written by: Mary Ann Wilson, Gretchen Wilson
- Directed by: Angelia Savage, Gretchen Wilson
- Presented by: KSPS-TV Spokane WA
- Starring: Mary Ann Wilson
- Theme music composer: Steve Samsel, with adaptation by Brad Pearson
- Country of origin: United States
- Original language: English
- No. of seasons: 19
- No. of episodes: 400

Production
- Executive producer: Mary Ann Wilson
- Producer: Gretchen Wilson
- Production company: KSPS-TV

Original release
- Network: PBS
- Release: 1987 – present

Sit and Be Fit is a half-hour television exercise program that airs on KSPS-TV out of Spokane, Washington, broadcast throughout the United States to over three-hundred PBS member stations and eighty-six million (Note: as of 2014) households. The show focuses on toning and stretching from a seated position, beneficial to individuals who are restricted physically. The show's mission statement is—"Sit and Be Fit is committed to improving the quality of life of older adults and physically limited individuals through safe, effective exercises that are available through television, videos, personal appearances, classes, seminars, books, and the Internet. The show actively promotes functional fitness, healing, and independence, and is an effective resource for professionals in aging and fitness." Launched in 1987, it was hosted by Mary Ann Wilson until her retirement in 2023.

== Background ==
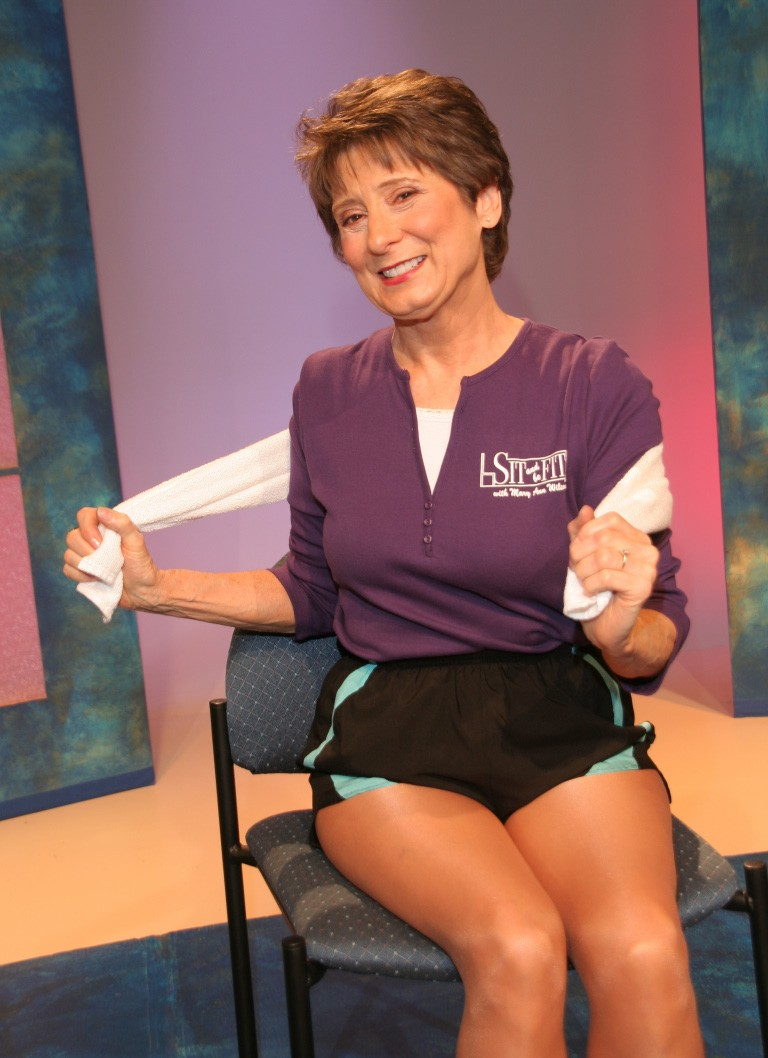
Mary Ann Wilson

The series was created by Mary Ann Wilson, RN, (pictured) who began her career in health as a registered nurse specializing in the field of post-polio rehabilitation and geriatrics. Beginning in 1980 as a high- and low-impact aerobics instructor, she was asked by the Community Colleges of Spokane's Institute for Extended Learning (IEL) in 1985 to develop a tone and stretch exercise program for residents at the South Hill Senior Center. Soon after they asked that she teach a class at the Canterbury Court apartments, and it was during these classes that she noticed her students, aged 70 to 95, were having difficulties with balance, coordination and fatigue, and she began to adapt the program by introducing the chair. She recognized that seniors who were moderately active or those managing chronic conditions or needing rehabilitation from strokes, heart attacks or other injuries would tire less and be more encouraged if sitting down, doing the movements slowly and gently.

Based on the positive response of individuals that took her classes, Wilson embarked on selling the idea for a television program in order to reach a larger audience, and in September 1986 contacted local stations in her area, including Bill Stanley, program director at KSPS, who liked the idea and asked her to keep in touch about it. Through her persistent letter writing and phone calls—"I hounded that poor man for nine months," Wilson said, Stanley agreed to do the show in May the following year, stating that it would appeal to KSPS' primary viewing audience of fifty and over. Thirty-four stations picked up the show in its first year, which was enough to warrant a second season. Over the years the show's popularity has grown steadily, with 70 stations signing on in 1995, 100 in 1999, 220 in 2014, and 300 in 2017. In April 2024 it was announced that new episodes were in the works, with Season 19 debuting April 24 through May 15, 2024 with ten new episodes, and Season 20 being planned for later in the year.

== Format ==
As host of the show, Mary Ann Wilson performs a variety of exercises to musical accompaniment while seated in a chair, although sometimes she performs while standing, using the chair as a prop for support. Simple household items like a small rubber ball or a hand towel, even a bag of lentils for weight resistance, are used occasionally to assist her with particular movements. She focuses on areas of the body like fingers, (Note: Finger exercises designed to relax and stretch the 27 joints of the hand) wrists, elbows, shoulders, neck, hips, knees and ankles to increase flexibility and range of motion while developing tone and strength, what Wilson calls "functional fitness," or fitness for everyday living.

The first years of taping had Wilson joined by two or three guests on the set, exercising along in unison. They ranged in age from kids to seniors, and were always introduced by Wilson at the beginning of the show. The show ran unscripted with cue cards, with cameras cuts between host and guests serving to give the show a down-to-earth feel while at the same time providing editors the ability to seamlessly omit the occasional blooper while taping was underway. The original theme music for the show was composed by Steve Samsel, a Spokane-based musician.

The current format is scripted and choreographed, with Wilson performing the exercises alone while seated. When doing standing exercises she is joined by her daughter, the show's producer/director Gretchen Wilson, who in unison with her mother performs the same movements while remaining seated—this for the benefit of viewers who are unable to stand. The show takes place on a minimally-decorated set with center stage painted decoratively by Gretchen Wilson, who is also a visual artist. Each season she paints a new design on the stage in preparation for taping. Theme music is a newer version of the original, still credited to Steve Samsel, with adaptation by Brad Pearson.

Wilson states that she finds ideas for the show from real-life situations, and with the help of her daughter consults with health-care professionals like doctors, physical therapists and specialists in preparation for each show to develop the exercises. Various programs have specific themes like "Neuro Rehab Workout," "COPD Workout," "Prevent DVT Workout," "Brain Fitness Workout" and "Boomer Workout." The "Neuro Rehab Workout" is designed to help people with neurological issues related to conditions such as Parkinson's disease, multiple sclerosis, a stroke or brain injury.

== Organization ==
Sit and Be Fit was set up as a non-profit endeavor from the very start, with production costs like designing the set and creating the theme song absorbed by KSPS. Initial run of the series comprised thirty episodes at 28½ minutes each. As with all PBS productions, costs are supported by fundraising efforts. "This is the perfect vehicle to make contact with older viewers," said program director Sean Herrin in 1995, discussing the benefits of producing a show seen by a large portion of its viewing demographic. "If they join and support KSPS, so much the better." Wilson has on numerous occasions refused to "sell out" because she wants the show to remain accessible, without the need for commercials or product endorsements. In 2000, the corporation filed for a non-profit status, and was granted the right to be a "501(c)(3) charitable organization."

== Reception ==
With an aging population and the almost universal promotion of staying active at all ages, especially those in retirement, the popularity of the show has grown steadily. Since its launch, the show has continued to receive letters from viewers describing the health benefits they have experienced by watching and following its exercises. Wilson ensures her staff responds to as many letters as possible, often researching questions about exercises for specific conditions.

Accolades

The program and its host, Mary Ann Wilson, have received numerous awards in the fields of health and fitness. In 1997 the show was chosen as Small Business of the Year by the American Society of Aging, while two of its home videos took gold at the National Health Information competition. In 2017 Wilson was inducted into the National Fitness Hall of Fame Museum & Institute and in 2019 was the recipient of President's Council on Sports, Fitness, and Nutrition Community Leadership Award.

Year	Awards	Nominee	Result	Ref.
2020	National Health Information Award	Sit and Be Fit: Lymphatic Health Workout	Gold	
2019	President's Council on Sports, Fitness, and Nutrition Community Leadership Award	Mary Ann Wilson, RN	Won	
2017	National Fitness Hall of Fame Museum & Institute	Mary Ann Wilson, RN	Inducted	
2015	National Mature Media Award, New Technologies and Resources, Health/Wellness Category	Sit and Be Fit: Chair Exercise Basics Course	Silver	
2012	National Health Information Award	Boomer Be Fit: Strength Workout	Merit	
2010	Aurora Award, Health and Fitness Category	Sit and Be Fit: COPD Workout	Gold	
1999	National Council on Aging: Best Practices in Health Promotion and Aging (video) Award	Sit and Be Fit	Won	
1997	Fitness Educators of Older Adults Association: Fitness Educator of the Year Award	Mary Ann Wilson, RN	Won	

== Notes, citations and sources ==
Notes

Citations

News

- Walton, Carolyn (August 27, 1987). "'Sit and Be Fit: KSPS-TV series focuses on exercise for seniors and the chair-bound". The Spokesman-Review. p. 6V.
- Atchison, Ron (March 7, 1988). "Learn how to 'Sit and be Fit'". The Spokesman-Review. p. B1.
- Vink, Graham (July 25, 1995). "Gentle fitness". The Spokesman-Review. pp. D1, D5.
- Fernandez, Maisy (October 21, 1997). "Exercise you can take while sitting down". The Spokesman-Review. p. D3.
- Bartel, Frank (May 2, 1999). "Fitness guru hones bodies, spirits". The Spokesman-Review. p. D2.
- Aleccia, JoNel (July 11, 2006). "Health Notes—New 'Sit and Be Fit' series begins production". The Spokesman-Review. p. D3.
- Curless, Erica (September 8, 2014). "'Sit and Be Fit' star continues to inspire nationwide audience". The Spokesman-Review. pp. C1, C3.
- Lind, Treva (August 1, 2019). "'Sit and Be Fit' founder gets national recognition: Wilson lauded for focus on fitness for all". The Spokesman-Review. p. Health 1.

Websites

- "Awards". Sit and Be Fit. March 26, 2015.
- "Normal Hand Anatomy". Colorado Orthopaedics.
- "The Sit And Be Fit Program Allows Wheelchair Bound to Exercise". Diets In Review.
- Lalley, Heather (November 1, 2005). "A perfect fit". Spokesman.
- Larue, Jennifer (June 26, 2007). "Paukert pleased with good fortune of being an artist". The Spokesman-Review.
- Sottile, Leah (November 1, 2009). "Not Sitting Still". Islander.
- Miller, Sarka-Jonae (July 8, 2011). "TV Exercise Programs for Seniors".
- Hval, Cindy (September 22, 2011). "Spokane's 'Sit and be Fit' creator headed to Big Apple". Spokesman.
- "Congratulations to the NFHOF Induction Class of 2017". National Fitness Hall of Fame Museum & Institute.
- Reep, Skyler (April 30, 2017). "Fitness Superstar Mary Ann Wilson, RN Inducted into the National Fitness Hall of Fame". KSPS PBS.
- "Sit and Be Fit ending song". YouTube. February 22, 2016.
- "Houston TV History". YouTube. October 10, 2020.
- "Stay Active As You Get Older: Quick Tips". U.S. Department of Health and Human Services.
- "Staying Active as You Age". Johns Hopkins Medicine.
- "Sit and Be Fit - Great News!". Facebook. April 10, 2024.
