= Jon Miyahara =

American actor (1941–2025)

- Miyahara in 2015
- Born: Jonathan Yasushi Miyahara; August 8, 1941; Los Angeles, California, U.S.
- Died: August 6, 2025 (aged 83)
- Occupation: Actor
- Years active: 2014–2025
- Known for: Superstore (2015–2021)

Jonathan Yasushi Miyahara (August 8, 1941 – August 6, 2025) was an American actor. He was best known for portraying Brett Kobashigawa in six seasons of the NBC workplace comedy Superstore.

== Early life ==
Miyahara was born in Los Angeles, California, on August 8, 1941. He was of Japanese American descent.

== Career ==
Jon Miyahara appeared in multiple episodes of the YouTube show Elders React. Miyahara's only major TV role was in Superstore in which he had just one line in six seasons. The character was thought to have been killed off in the Season 2 finale, but returned in Season 3. He had a cameo appearance in NBC's American Auto. Alongside Nico Santos and Nichole Bloom, Miyahara was praised for the representation of Asian Americans.

== Death ==
Miyahara died on August 6, 2025, at the age of 83.
