= Mary Ann Wilson =

American nurse and television fitness instructor (1938–2025)

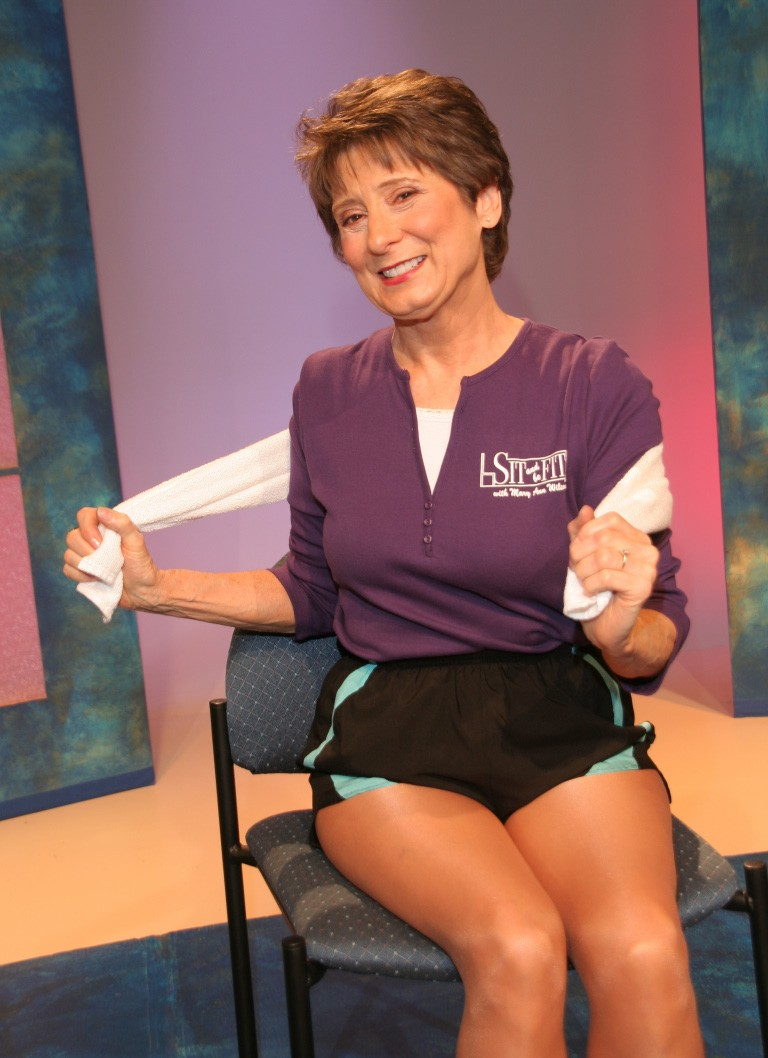
- Born: May 15, 1938
- Died: November 5, 2025 (age 87)
- Occupations: Nurse and TV fitness instructor
- Known for: host of Sit and Be Fit

Mary Ann Wilson (May 15, 1938 – November 5, 2025) was an American nurse and television fitness instructor. Wilson was also the founder and host of the award-winning exercise show Sit and Be Fit, which is broadcast on over 100 PBS television stations across the United States.

In 1987, Wilson started the PBS show Sit and Be Fit which includes a variety of exercises for the elderly and people with limited mobility. The show revolves around exercises that can be done while sitting in or using a chair, with little effort.

== Early life and career ==
Wilson began her career as a registered nurse specializing in geriatrics and post-polio rehabilitation. In 1985, while teaching an aerobics class, she noticed her older adult clients suffering a high incidence of injury and attrition. In response, she designed a gentle program tailored to their needs. As students began reporting marked improvement in their physical and mental health, Wilson became convinced that there was a need for this type of exercise program on a national level. In 1987, KSPS-TV agreed to produce her Sit and Be Fit television series and distributed the first 30 episodes nationwide. Sit and Be Fit has aired regularly on PBS stations nationwide ever since.

Wilson was the author of several health and fitness publications, including Chair Exercise Basics and was featured in columns on health in the aging community. She educated healthcare and fitness professionals at national and international health conferences.

In 2017, she was inducted into the National Fitness Hall of Fame.

Wilson's activities and history included:

- Registered Nurse
- Executive Producer/Host, SIT AND BE FIT television series
- Executive Director/Founder, SIT AND BE FIT non-profit organization
- Nationally certified by American Council on Exercise
- Member, ASA (American Society on Aging)
- Member, NCOA (National Council on the Aging)
- Member, SFA (American Senior Fitness Association) National Advisory Board
- Member, FEOAA (Fitness Educators Of Active Adults)
- Presenter, IDEA Conventions: 1987, 1988, 1989, 1991, 1995, 1996
- Presenter, 1st International Conference, Prevention: the Key Health for Life, 1994
- Presenter, 4th International Congress, Physical Activity, Aging and Sports, Heidelberg, Germany, 1996

== Personal life and death ==
Wilson and her daughter, Gretchen Wilson, who produces and directs the Sit and Be Fit programs her mother hosted, also appear together in the Boomer Be Fit DVD, which Wilson hosts. They resided in Spokane, Washington, where both the Sit and Be Fit TV program and the SABF organization, which is non-profit, are based.

Wilson died in her sleep on November 5, 2025, at the age of 87 from hypertensive atherosclerotic cardiovascular disease at her home in Spokane, Washington.
