= The Hitchhiker (TV series) =

Television show filmed in Vancouver

- Title screen
- Genre: Anthology; Horror; Mystery
- Starring: Page Fletcher; Nicholas Campbell
- Composers: Paul Hoffert; Shuki Levy; Michel Rubini; Haim Saban
- Countries of origin: United States; Canada; France
- Original language: English
- No. of seasons: 6
- No. of episodes: 85

Production
- Executive producers: Lewis Chesler; Riff Markowitz; Richard Rothstein; Jeremy Lipp; Jacques Methe; David Perlmutter
- Running time: 30 minutes (approx.)
- Production companies: Markowitz Chester Producing; DIC Audiovisuel (seasons 4-6)

Original release
- Network: HBO (1983–1987); First Choice (1983–1987); USA Network (1989–1991); La Cinq (1989–1991)
- Release: November 23, 1983 – February 22, 1991

The Hitchhiker (also known as Deadly Nightmares in the United Kingdom and Le Voyageur in France) is a mystery horror anthology television series. It aired from 1983 to 1987 on HBO, and First Choice and NTV in Canada. The series moved to the USA Network from 1989 to 1991.

== Synopsis ==
Each episode is introduced and concluded by a mysterious wanderer known only as "The Hitchhiker", and explores the foibles of humanity and its dark spirit. The title character was played by Nicholas Campbell from 1983-1984 (3 episodes), and Page Fletcher from 1984-1991 (82 episodes). There were a total of 85 episodes over six seasons (39 first runs on HBO and 46 first runs on USA).

== Production ==
The series was a United States/Canada/France co-production. It was filmed in Vancouver and Toronto, Ontario, Canada and Paris, France. The show was produced by Corazon Productions (Season 1 for a total of three episodes), Quintina Productions (Seasons 2-4 for a total of 36 episodes), and La Cinq, Atlantique & Quintina Productions (Seasons 5-6 for a total of 46 episodes).

The Hitchhiker was created by Lewis Chesler and Riff Markowitz, later joined by Richard Rothstein. The pilot episode consisted of three stories. Richard Rothstein wrote two and Jeph Loeb and Matt Weissman wrote the third.

Paul Hoffert created the theme music for the show.

== Episodes ==
=== Series overview ===
Season	Episodes	Originally released		
Season	Episodes	First released	Last released	Network
1	3	November 23, 1983	December 14, 1983	HBO
2	10	November 13, 1984	April 9, 1985	HBO
3	13	September 15, 1985	April 22, 1986	HBO
4	13	February 17, 1987	May 12, 1987	HBO
5	26	May 22, 1989	December 16, 1989	USA Network
6	20	September 21, 1990	February 22, 1991	USA Network

=== Season 1 (1983) ===
No. overall	No. in season	Title	Directed by	Written by	Original release date
1	1	"Shattered Vows"	Ivan Nagy	Lewis Chesler	November 23, 1983
2	2	"When Morning Comes"	Ivan Nagy	Lewis Chesler	November 30, 1983
3	3	"Split Decision"	Ivan Nagy	Lewis Chesler	December 14, 1983

=== Season 2 (1984–85) ===
No. overall	No. in season	Title	Directed by	Written by	Original release date
4	1	"Lovesounds"	David Wickes	Jeph Loeb & Matthew Weisman	November 13, 1984
5	2	"Remembering Melody"	Christopher Leitch	Teleplay by : Alvin Sapinsley; Based on a short story by : George R. R. Martin	November 27, 1984
6	3	"Face to Face"	David Wickes	Story by : Richard Rothstein; Teleplay by : Robert J. Avrech	December 4, 1984
7	4	"And If We Dream"	Mai Zetterling	Story by : Richard Rothstein; Teleplay by : Leora Barish	January 15, 1985
8	5	"Petty Thieves"	Christopher Leitch	Story by : Richard Rothstein; Teleplay by : William Darrid	January 29, 1985
9	6	"Videodate"	Richard Rothstein	Richard Rothstein	February 16, 1985
10	7	"A Time for Rifles"	David Wickes	Written by : Stanford Whitmore; Story by : H.A. DeRose	March 2, 1985
11	8	"Man at the Window"	Christopher Leitch	Michael Janover	March 12, 1985
12	9	"Hired Help"	Mai Zetterling	Written by : Stanford Whitmore; Story by : Gail Glaze	March 26, 1985
13	10	"Murderous Feelings"	Mai Zetterling	Charles Israel	April 9, 1985

=== Season 3 (1985–86) ===
No. overall	No. in season	Title	Directed by	Written by	Original release date
14	1	"Nightshift"	Phillip Noyce	Story by : April Campbell Jones & Bruce Jones; Teleplay by : William Darrid	September 15, 1985
15	2	"Out of the Night"	Brian Grant	Story by : Richard Rothstein; Teleplay by : Marjorie David	October 29, 1985
16	3	"The Killer"	Carl Schenkel	Story by : Richard Rothstein & Christopher Leitch; Teleplay by : April Campbell Jones & Bruce Jones	November 12, 1985
17	4	"W.G.O.D"	Mike Hodges	Story by : Richard Rothstein; Teleplay by : Thomas Baum	November 26, 1985
18	5	"Man's Best Friend"	Philip Noyce	Story by : April Campbell Jones & Bruce Jones; Teleplay by : Nevin Schreiner	December 10, 1985
19	6	"Ghostwriter"	Carl Schenkel	Thomas Baum	January 7, 1986
20	7	"O.D. Feelin'"	Richard Rothstein	Richard Rothstein & Christopher Leitch	January 28, 1986
21	8	"Dead Man's Curve"	Roger Vadim	Story by : Christopher Leitch; Teleplay by : John Harrison	February 11, 1986
22	9	"The Curse"	Phillip Noyce	Story by : Richard Rothstein & Christopher Leitch; Teleplay by : Thomas Baum	February 25, 1986
23	10	"True Believer"	Carl Schenkel	William Kelly	March 11, 1986
24	11	"Last Scene"	Paul Verhoeven	Story by : Richard Rothstein; Teleplay by : Robert J. Avrech	March 25, 1986
25	12	"Man of Her Dreams"	Phillip Noyce	Story by : April Campbell & Bruce Jones; Teleplay by : Gary Ross	April 8, 1986
26	13	"One Last Prayer"	Brian Grant	Story by : April Campbell & Bruce Jones; Teleplay by : Leora Barish & Henry Bean	April 22, 1986

=== Season 4 (1987) ===
No. overall	No. in season	Title	Directed by	Written by	Original release date
27	1	"Perfect Order"	Daniel Vigne	Marjorie David	February 17, 1987
28	2	"Minuteman"	Chris Thomson	Thomas Baum	February 24, 1987
29	3	"Dead Heat"	Kees Van Oostrum	Story by : William Rontog; Teleplay by : Maurice Noel	March 3, 1987
30	4	"Why Are You Here?"	Chris Thomson	Story by : Christopher Leitch; Teleplay by : Christopher Leitch & L. M. Kit Carson	March 10, 1987
31	5	"Homebodies"	Carl Schenkel	Story by : Christopher Leitch & Richard Rothstein; Teleplay by : Christopher Leitch	March 17, 1987
32	6	"Doctor's Orders"	Reynaldo Villalobos	Thomas Baum	March 24, 1987
33	7	"The Legendary Billy B."	Chris Thomson	Story by : Marjorie David; Teleplay by : L. M. Kit Carson	March 31, 1987
34	8	"In the Name of Love"	John Laing	Story by : Richard Rothstein, Christopher Leitch & Jeremy Lipp; Teleplay by : Jeremy Lipp	April 7, 1987
35	9	"Made for Each Other"	Thomas Baum	Thomas Baum	April 14, 1987
36	10	"Joker"	Colin Bucksey	Story by : James Padrino; Teleplay by : William Gray & Robert Reneau	April 21, 1987
37	11	"Best Shot"	John Kent Harrison	John Kent Harrison	April 28, 1987
38	12	"Secret Ingredient"	Colin Bucksey	Gail Glaze	May 5, 1987
39	13	"Cabin Fever"	Clyde Monroe	Story by : April Campbell, Bruce Jones & David Latt; Teleplay by : April Campbell, Bruce Jones & Jon Boorstin	May 12, 1987

=== Season 5 (1989) ===
1. "The Martyr" (1989-04-22)
2. "In Living Color" (1989-04-29)
3. "Dark Wishes" (1989-07-01)
4. "Garter Belt" (1989-07-07)
5. "Shadow Puppets" (1989-07-08)
6. "Renaissance" (1989-07-14)
7. "The Miracle of Alice Ames" (1989-07-15)
8. "Code Liz" (1989-07-21)
9. "Her Finest Hour" (1989-07-22)
10. "Together Forever" (1989-07-28)
11. "Phantom Zone" (1989-08-04)
12. "Spinning Wheel" (1989-08-05)
13. "Square Deal" (1989-08-11)
14. "Part of Me" (1989-08-12)
15. "Fashion Exchange" (1989-08-18)
16. "Hootch" (1989-09-16)
17. "Coach" (1989-09-30)
18. "The Verdict" (1989-11-04)
19. "Hit and Run" (1989-11-10)
20. "Studio 3X" (1989-11-11)
21. "Striptease" (1989-11-17)
22. "The Cruelest Cut" (1989-11-18)
23. "The Dying Generation" (1989-11-24)
24. "My Enemy" (1989-11-25)
25. "Power Play" (1989-12-09)
26. "Pawns" (1989-12-16)

=== Season 6 (1990–91) ===
1. "Fading Away" (1990-09-21)
2. "Tough Guys Don't Whine" (1990-09-28)
3. "Riding the Nightmare" (1990-10-05)
4. "Strate Shooter" (1990-10-12)
5. "Hard Rhyme" (1990-10-19)
6. "Toxic Shock" (1990-10-26)
7. "New Dawn" (1990-11-02)
8. "A Function of Control" (1990-11-09)
9. "Trust Me" (1990-11-16)
10. "Windows" (1990-11-23)
11. "Working Girl" (1990-11-30)
12. "White Slaves" (1990-12-07)
13. "Tourist Trap" (1990-12-14)
14. "Homecoming" (1991-01-11)
15. "Living a Lie" (1991-01-18)
16. "Made in Paris" (1991-01-25)
17. "A Whole New You" (1991-02-01)
18. "Offspring" (1991-02-08)
19. "Secrets" (1991-02-15)
20. "New Blood" (1991-02-22)

== Cast ==
Like the much earlier Twilight Zone series, with which it had a lot of other commonalities, The Hitchhiker served as starting point for many actors, some of whom would go on to gain greater recognition elsewhere. Notable cast members (in alphabetical order):

- Edward Albert: Arthur Brown in "Man at the Window" (1985)
- Kirstie Alley: Angelica in "Out of the Night" (1985), Jane L. in "The Legendary Billy B." (1987)
- Melody Anderson: Sterling Jenkins in "Cruelest Cut" (1989)
- Susan Anspach: Claudia in "Dead Man's Curve" (1986)
- Elizabeth Ashley: Woman in "Out of the Night" (1985)
- Belinda Bauer: Veronica Hoffman in "Lovesounds" (1984)
- Robby Benson: Bart in "Tourist Trap" (1990)
- Sandra Bernhard: Rat in "O.D. Feelin" (1986)
- Rachel Blanchard: Karen O'Neill in "Riding the Nightmare" (1990)
- Karen Black: Kay Mason in "Hired Help" (1985)
- Lisa Hartman Black: Cheryl in "Her Finest Hour" (1989)
- Susan Blakely: Melody in "Remembering Melody" (1984)
- Lisa Blount: Miranda in "One Last Prayer" (1986)
- Barry Bostwick: Tony in "Ghostwriter" (1986)
- Timothy Bottoms: Peter in "Joker" (1987)
- Melissa Brennan: Denise in "Homebodies" (1987)
- Dennis Burkley: The Fool in "O.D. Feelin' (1986)
- Gary Busey: Reverend Nolan Powers in "W.G.O.D." (1985)
- Robert Carradine: Frank in "Garter Belt" (1989)
- Rae Dawn Chong: Leesa White in "New Blood" (1991)
- Candy Clark: Cheryl in "Secret Ingredient" (1987)
- Christopher Collet: Jimmy in "Homebodies" (1987)
- Stephen Collins: Todd Fields in "And if We Dream" (1985)
- Bud Cort: Wax in "Made for Each Other" (1987)
- Peter Coyote: Alex in "Last Scene" (1985)
- Willem Dafoe: Jeffrey Hunt in "Ghostwriter" (1985)
- Joe Dallesandro: Julien in "Fashion Exchange" (1988)
- Lawrence Dane: Cop / Surgeon in "Out of the Night" (1985)
- Sybil Danning: Gloria in "Face to Face" (1984)
- Patti D'Arbanville: Wendy in "Spinning Wheel" (1985)
- Brad Davis: Mulack in "Why Are You Here?" (1987)
- Michael Des Barres: The Wise Man in "O.D. Feelin" (1986)
- Vernon Dobtcheff: Pimp in "Renaissance" (1989)
- Brad Dourif: Billy B. in "The Legendary Billy B." (1987)
- Polly Draper: Jennifer Richmond in "The Verdict" (1989)
- David Dukes: Ted Miller in "Remembering Melody" (1984)
- David James Elliott: Jason in "The Cruelest Cut" (1989)
- Greg Evigan: Johnnie in "In the Name of Love" (1987)
- Joe Flaherty: The Chemist in "O.D. Feelin' (1986)
- Louise Fletcher: Mother Birch in "Offspring" (1991)
- Meg Foster: Deirdre in "The Martyr" (1989)
- Robert Foxworth: Lee Greavy in "Hard Rhyme" (1990)
- Mary Frann: Veronica in "Secrets" (1991)
- Zach Galligan: Dick Raskin in "Toxic Shock" (1990)
- Jason Gedrick: Tommy in "Phantom Zone" (1989)
- John Glover: Miles Duchet in "Striptease" (1989)
- Elliott Gould: Augie Benson in "A Whole New You" (1990)
- David Marshall Grant: Jake in "Windows" (1990)
- Vincent Grass: Police Officer in "White Slaves", "Part of Me" and "The Miracle of Alice Ames" (1989)
- Erin Gray: Leslie in "Together Forever" (1989)
- Bruce Greenwood: Jeff Boder in "Shattered Vows" (1983)
- Lucy Gutteridge: Jackie Dresser in "In the Name of Love" (1989)
- Charles Haid: Coach Billy Bolt in "Coach" (1989)
- Antony Hamilton: Jim Buckley in "Man of Her Dreams" (1986)
- Harry Hamlin: Jerry Maclachlan in "The Curse" (1986)
- Marilyn Hassett: Jill McGinnis in "Man of Her Dreams" (1986)
- Jill Hennessy: Marla Cross in "Striptease" (1989), Elisabeth in "Pawns" (1989)
- Gregg Henry: Jack Rhodes in "Videodate" (1985)
- Anthony Holland: Lawyer in "Shattered Vows" (1983)
- Bo Hopkins: Lew Bridegman in "A Time for Rifles" (1985)
- Patrick Houser: Jonathan in "The Killer" (1989)
- Ken Howard: Dubois in "Homecoming" (1991)
- C. Thomas Howell: Gerald Brumner in "White Slaves" (1990)
- Season Hubley: Miranda in "Cabin Fever" (1987)
- Helen Hunt: Donette in "Why are You Here?" (1987)
- Lauren Hutton: Tess O'Neill in "Riding the Nightmare" (1990)
- John Ireland: Jack Guttman in "A Time for Rifles" (1985)
- Michael Ironside: Sheriff Lee in "Dead Man's Curve" (1986)
- Robert Ito: Sato in "W.G.O.D." (1985)
- Claude Jade: Monique in "Windows" (1990)
- Brion James: Lionel in "Best Shot" (1987)
- Daniel Kash: Killer in "Hard Rhyme" (1990)
- Brian Kerwin: Doctor Winters in "Shadow Puppets" (1989)
- Margot Kidder: Janie in "Nightshift" (1986)
- Perry King: Doug in "Studio 3X" (1989)
- Klaus Kinski: Kurt Hoffmann in "Love Sounds" (1985)
- Lorenzo Lamas: Tom Astor in "Trust Me" (1990)
- Audrey Landers: Priscilla Packard in "Split Decision" (1983)
- Judy Landers: Frances Packard in "Split Decision" (1983)
- Paul Le Mat: Jake Purely in "Doctor's Orders" (1987)
- Peggy Lipton: Helen in "Working Girl" (1990)
- Kelly Lynch: Theresa / Melissa in "Joker" (1987)
- Michael Madsen: John Hampton in "The Man at the Window" (1985)
- Virginia Madsen: Christina in "Perfect Order" (1987)
- Chris Makepeace: Jeremy in "Power Play" (1989)
- Nick Mancuso: Mitchell in "Fading Away" (1990)
- Dean Paul Martin: Chris in "Secret Ingredient" (1987)
- Roberta Maxwell: Marybeth in "Dying Generation" (1989)
- Jeff McCracken: Allen in "Joker" (1987)
- Darren McGavin: Old Man in "Nightshift" (1986)
- Stephen McHattie: Joe Caldwell in "A Time for Rifles" (1985), Johnny in "Nightshift" (1985)
- Nancy McKeon: Dawn Wilder in "New Dawn" (1990)
- Penelope Milford: Diane Hampton in "Man at the Window" (1985)
- Stephen E. Miller: Worker #1 in "Nightshift" (1985), Bullet in "In the Name of Love" (1987)
- Belinda Montgomery: Carla Magnuson in "The Man at the Window" (1985)
- Carrie-Anne Moss: Lookalike in "My Enemy" (1989)
- Ornella Muti: Sister Theresa in "True Believer" (1987)
- Franco Nero: Dr. Peter Milne in "Murderous Feelings" (1985)
- Michael O'Keefe: Richard in "Man's Best Friend" (1985)
- Ken Olin: Steve in "Best Shot" (1987)
- Michael Ontkean: Gordon Brooks in "Square Deal" (1989)
- Jerry Orbach: Cameron in "Cabin Fever" (1987)
- Geraldine Page: Lynette Powers in "W.G.O.D." (1985)
- Joe Pantoliano: Brother Charles in "The Miracle of Alice Ames" (1988)
- Alexandra Paul: Julie in "Minuteman" (1987)
- Bill Paxton: Trout in "Made for Each Other" (1987)
- Frank Pellegrino: Bowie in "Tough Guys Don't Whine" (1990)
- Joel Polis: Carl in "Man's Best Friend" (1985)
- Olivier Rabourdin: Denis LeBreaux in "A Whole New You" (1991)
- Steve Railsback: Mickey in "Petty Thieves" (1985)
- Bruce Ramsay: Manuel in "The Verdict" (1989)
- James Remar: Ron in "Homebodies" (1987)
- Donnelly Rhodes: Herb Mason in "Hired Help" (1985)
- Beah Richards: Serita in "The Curse" (1986)
- Sebastian Roché: Victor Ismael in "Phantom Zone" (1989), Glenn Birch in "Offspring" (1991)
- Clayton Rohner: Harry Deakon in "Doctor's Orders" (1987)
- Anny Romand: Juliette in "Phantom Zone" (1989)
- Christopher Rydell: Johnny Matell in "Strate Shooter" (1990)
- August Schellenberg: Bob Ames in "When Morning Comes" (1983)
- Michael Schoeffling: Lance in "Dead Man's Curve" (1986)
- Jenny Seagrove: Meg in "Killer" (1985)
- Joan Severance: Jane / Holly in "My Enemy" (1989)
- Ray Sharkey: Eric Coleman in "In Living Color" (1990)
- John Shea: Jeremy in "Minuteman" (1987)
- James Shigeta: Nishi in "Perfect Order" (1987)
- Madeline Sherwood: Vivian in "Ghostwriter" (1986)
- Gene Simmons: Mr. Big in "O.D. Feelin" (1986)
- Marc Singer: Robert Lewis in "Code Liz" (1989)
- Tom Skerritt: Detective Frank Sheen in "True Believer" (1986)
- Renée Soutendijk: Sara Kendal in "Serious Feelings" (1985)
- David Soul: Cooper Halliday in "Renaissance" (1989)
- Parker Stevenson: Brett in "Best Shot" (1987)
- Alexandra Stewart: Jackie Winslow in "Shattered Vows" (1983)
- Ted Stidder: Liquor Store Owner in "Homebodies" (1987)
- Andy Summers: Hodie in "The Legendary Billy B." (1987)
- Alan Thicke: Mickey Black in "Tough Guys Don't Whine" (1990)
- Angel Tompkins: Janet O'Mell in "Homebodies" (1987)
- Shannon Tweed: Barbara in "Videodate" (1984), Dr. Rita de Roy in "Doctor's Orders" (1987)
- Susan Tyrrell: Doris in "In the Name of Love" (1987)
- Robert Vaughn: Dr. Christopher Hamilton in "Face to Face" (1984)
- M. Emmet Walsh: Detective Underhill in "Ghostwriter" (1986)
- Fred Ward: Luthor Redmond in "Dead Heat" (1987)
- Alberta Watson: Jill Friedlander in "Remembering Melody" (1984)
- Bruce Weitz: Ray in "Hit and Run" (1989)
- Stephanie Zimbalist: Heather in "Hootch" (1989)

== Syndication ==
In 1995, The Hitchhiker entered syndication. To make the HBO episodes suitable for US broadcast television, edits were made, both for content (to remove nudity/gore/adult language) and for running time, to get them down to the standard 22-minute length needed to insert commercials. Reruns in foreign markets, such as Canada and Europe, often still contained the nudity/language/gore.

After 1983, (but prior to the 1995 syndication), the first three episodes had footage edited and/or re-shot to replace Nicholas Campbell with Page Fletcher, in order to preserve continuity during reruns. The Hitchhiker was syndicated by Rysher Entertainment (since absorbed by CBS Television Distribution) up until 2000.

== Home media ==
Lorimar Home Video released four VHS volumes of HBO episodes to the rental market in 1987 (a trade ad for the first two volumes confirms those were also released on Beta format). Volume 1 contained "W.G.O.D", "The Curse" and "Hired Help". Volume 2 consisted of "Nightshift", "Dead Man's Curve" and "Perfect Order". The third volume had "Ghostwriter", "And If We Dream" and "True Believer". The final Lorimar tape had "Videodate", "Man's Best Friend" and "Face to Face". These four volumes were also issued on laserdisc the following year.

Budget label Goodtimes Home Video also released a single VHS volume containing three of the USA Network episodes in 1989. That tape contained "Her Finest Hour", "In Living Color" and "My Enemy".

HBO Home Video released a three-volume set on DVD between 2004–2006, featuring various episodes from the series. The two-disc, three-volume sets contain a selection of 30 episodes, most from the HBO-produced episodes but also including some that were made for the USA Network.

In Australia, Volumes 1 and 2 were issued together in a single set, but instead of 20 episodes, the Australian set consists of only 17, leaving out "The Legendary Billy B.", "A Whole New You" and "Dead Heat".

In the United Kingdom, only the first HBO volume was released. This particular release contained nine episodes instead of 10. As with the Australian set, "The Legendary Billy B." is omitted from this release.

In Canada, Koch Entertainment released Canadian seasons 1 and 3 (which correspond to US Seasons 1-3 and 5, respectively) on DVD in 2004. On October 18, 2005, Koch released The Complete Fourth Season (which corresponds to US Season 6). According to Koch, the reason Canadian Season 2 (US Season 4) was not released was due to them not being able to find out who owned the Canadian distribution rights to those particular episodes.

Alliance Home Entertainment released The Hitchhiker: The Complete Collection on DVD in Canada on October 11, 2011. Despite being labeled as "The Complete Collection", the set actually combines the three previously released, incomplete HBO Home Video compilation volumes into one set.

Between the three HBO volumes and the Canadian season sets, all episodes of the show were released on home video except for "Minuteman" and "Doctor's Orders" (both of which came from US Season 4).

As of 2025, The Hitchhiker is not available on HBO's streaming service, HBO Max.

== Awards and nominations ==
Year	Award	Result	Category	Recipient
1987	CableACE Awards	Nominated	Actress in a Dramatic Series	Jenny Seagrove (For episode "Killer")
1987	CableACE Awards	Nominated	Actress in a Dramatic Series	Kirstie Alley (For episode "Out of the Night")
1987	CableACE Awards	Nominated	Actor in a Dramatic Series	Michael O'Keefe (For episode "Man's Best Friend")
1987	CableACE Awards	Won	Actor in a Dramatic Series	Gary Busey (For episode "WGOD")
1999	Gemini Award	Nominated	Best Sound in a Dramatic Program or Series	Tim Archer, W. Michael Beard, Rick Ellis, Thomas Hidderley, and Anthony Lancett
