= Riff Markowitz =

American screenwriter (1938–2025)

Rifael Ronald Markowitz (1938 – September 17, 2025) was a Canadian-American television and theatre producer, later the managing director, MC and co-founder of The Fabulous Palm Springs Follies, which performed at the historic Plaza Theatre in downtown Palm Springs, California, for 23 seasons until closing in 2014.

== Life and career ==
Markowitz was born in 1938 in New York City, but grew up in Toronto, Ontario, Canada.

He ran away from home at the age of 15 to join the circus and work as a clown for a year. He then secured a job as a radio announcer on CJKL in Kirkland Lake, Ontario. He later moved into television with CHCH-TV in Hamilton, producing several of the station's early forays into television syndication, including The Randy Dandy Show, which he created in 1961, The Hilarious House of Frightenstein, which he co-created with his brother Mitch in 1971, and Party Game.

Markowitz was also an on-air television personality, both as the titular Randy Dandy in The Randy Dandy Show, and as announcer "Gardiner Westbound" on Party Game.

He was also a producer on The Wolfman Jack Show, and a co-founder of early Canadian pay television movie channel First Choice in 1983.

Markowitz moved to Los Angeles where he produced musical variety and comedy specials for HBO in the late 1970s and early 1980s, including specials featuring Neil Simon, Tony Curtis, Red Skelton, and George Burns.

In 1983, he co-created and executive produced the mystery anthology series The Hitchhiker for HBO.

He moved to Palm Springs in 1991 intending to retire, but his continuing interest in theatre led to the offer to restore a vaudeville theatre, which became home to The Fabulous Palm Springs Follies.

Markowitz died after a short illness on September 17, 2025, at the age of 86.
