= List of people from Palm Springs, California =

This list of people from Palm Springs, California describes notable residents who have had homes in the city and nearby resort communities of the Coachella Valley. These communities, which include Palm Springs, Bermuda Dunes, Cathedral City, Coachella, Desert Hot Springs, Indian Wells, Indio, La Quinta, Palm Desert, Rancho Mirage and Thermal are in the Coachella Valley of Riverside County, southern California.

== Palm Springs Walk of Stars ==
Nearly 500 of Palm Springs area notable residents have been honored with Golden Palm Stars on the Palm Springs Walk of Stars. In October 2025, architect Herbert Burns became the newest recipient of a star.

=== Honorees ===
==== Inaugural Honorees ====
The first five inductees were:

- Earle C. Strebe, Owner of the Plaza Theatre
- William Powell, Actor
- Ruby Keeler, Actress, dancer, and singer
- Charles Farrell, Actor and politician
- Ralph Bellamy, Actor

==== Special Medal of Honor recipients ====
Five Medal of Honor recipients from the Coachella Valley were honored during the 1999 Veterans Day holiday.

- HM1 Robert E. Bush, US Navy
- Maj. Gen. James Lewis Day, US Marine Corps
- Capt. William McGonagle, US Navy, awarded for heroism during the 1967 USS Liberty incident
- Col. Lewis Millett, US Army
- Col. Mitchell Paige, US Marine Corps

=== Former presidents ===
Three former presidents of the United States lived in the Palm Springs area after their retirement.

- Dwight Eisenhower
- Gerald Ford
- Ronald Reagan

== Other Palm Springs residents ==
=== Early settlers (pre-World War I) ===
- Howard Burnham – mining engineer and World War I spy
- J. Smeaton Chase – early 20th century travel writer
- Edward Curtis – photographer of Native Americans, especially the Cahuilla people
- Carl Eytel – early artist of desert landscapes and book illustrator
- Edmund C. Jaeger – early school teacher (1905) in Palm Springs and noted naturalist
- George Wharton James – author of the 1906 Wonders of the Colorado Desert
- June McCarroll – nurse and physician with the Southern Pacific Railroad (Note: Invented the concept of road surface marking.)
- Jimmy Swinnerton – cartoonist and painter

=== Show business – performers ===
- Don Adams – actor, comedian and director
- Edie Adams – actress
- John Agar – actor
- Bobby Anderson – actor
- Herbert Anderson – character actor
- Russell Arms – actor
- Desi Arnaz – musician, actor and television producer (Note: With spouse Lucille Ball)
- Desi Arnaz Jr. – actor and musician (Note: Son of Lucille Ball and Desi Arnaz)
- Lucie Désirée Arnaz – actress, singer, dancer and producer (Note: Daughter of Lucille Ball and Desi Arnaz)
- Dorothy Arnold – film actress
- Mary Astor – actress
- Alana Austin – film and television actress
- Vivian Austin – actress and model
- Gene Autry – actor and singer (Note: Jackie Autry and Gene Autry were spouses.)
- Jim Bailey – actor, singer and female impersonator
- Fay Bainter – film and stage actress
- Lucille Ball – comedian, film, television, stage and radio actress, model, film and television executive (Note: With spouse Desi Arnaz and later with spouse Gary Morton)
- Kaye Ballard – comedian and actress
- Don Barclay – character actor
- Binnie Barnes – actress
- John Barrowman – actor
- William Bendix – actor
- Jack Benny – comedian (Note: Jack Benny and Mary Livingstone were spouses.)
- Michael Bentine – comedian, comic actor and writer
- Edgar Bergen – actor and ventriloquist
- Polly Bergen – actress
- Tom Bosley – actor
- Stephen Boyd – actor
- Elisabeth Brooks – actress
- Dorothy Burgess – stage and film actress
- Paul Burke – actor
- Charles Butterworth – comedic actor
- Rory Calhoun – television and film actor, screenwriter and producer
- Dyan Cannon – actress (Note: Cary Grant and Cannon lived in his Las Palomas estate part-time during their marriage.)
- Judy Canova – comedian, actress, singer, and radio personality
- Eddie Cantor – actor, singer, songwriter, comedian
- Jean Carson – stage, film and television actress
- Ann Carter – child actress
- Don Castle – actor
- Mary Castle – film and television actress
- Jeff Chandler – actor and singer
- Sydney Chaplin – actor and restaurant owner
- Cyd Charisse – actress and dancer (Note: Cyd Charisse and Tony Martin were spouses)
- Claudette Colbert – actress
- Chuck Connors – actor
- Jackie Coogan – actor
- Keith Coogan – actor
- Jackie Cooper – actor
- Lou Costello – actor and comedian
- Joseph Cotten – stage and film actor
- Bing Crosby – singer and actor
- Tony Curtis – actor
- Lili Damita – actress
- Marion Davies – actress and socialite
- Joan Davis – comedic actress
- Sandra Dee – film actress
- William Demarest – character actor
- Richard Denning – actor
- Leonardo DiCaprio – actor
- Andy Dick – comedian
- Rosie Dolly – Vaudeville performer, with twin Jenny
- Kirk Douglas – actor
- Betsy Drake – actress and writer (Note: Cary Grant and Drake were spouses when they bought the Los Palomas estate in the Movie Colony.)
- Don Durant – actor and singer
- Negin Farsad – comedian, writer and actress
- Susan Fleming – actress
- Errol Flynn – actor
- Virginia Fox – actress
- Clark Gable – actor
- Ava Gardner – actress
- William Gargan – actor
- Judy Garland – actress and singer
- Gregory Gaye – actor
- Hoot Gibson – rodeo champion and cowboy film star
- Laurel Goodwin – actress
- Cary Grant – actor (Note: Grant and Barbara Hutton were spouses. He was married to Betsy Drake when they bought the Los Palomas estate in the Movie Colony. He and Betsy Cannon lived in his Las Palomas estate part-time during their marriage)
- Shauna Grant a.k.a. Colleen Applegate – nude model and pornographic actress
- Bonita Granville – actress and television producer
- Erin Gray – actress
- Shecky Greene – comedian
- William Haines – film actor and interior designer
- Ron Hale – television actor
- Christian Haren – actor, model and community activist
- Eden Hartford – film actress
- Lindsay Hartley – actress and singer
- Laurence Harvey – actor
- Russell Hayden – film and television actor (Note: Russell Hayden and Lillian Porter were spouses.)
- Louis Hayward – actor
- Rita Hayworth – actress and dancer
- Emmaline Henry – actress
- Katharine Hepburn – actress
- Billy Herrington – bisexual pornographic actor, model and Internet personality
- Phyllis Hodges Boyce – film and television actress
- William Holden – actor
- Alex Hyde-White – actor
- Stella Inger – television news anchor
- Michael Irby – film and television actor
- Jesse James – actor
- David Janssen – film and television actor
- Van Johnson – film and television actor
- Carolyn Jones – actress
- Gabe Kaplan – actor and professional poker player
- Stubby Kaye – comedic actor
- Udo Kier – actor
- Nancy Kulp – comedic actress
- Alan Ladd – actor
- Fernando Lamas – actor and director
- Jack Lambert – actor
- Dorothy Lamour – actress
- Richard (Dick) Lane – television announcer and actor
- Peter Lawford – actor
- Marc Lawrence – character actor
- Francis Lederer – film and stage actor
- Janet Leigh – actress
- Bruce Lester – actor
- Jerry Lewis – comedian, actor, screenwriter and film director
- Robert (Bob) Livingston – actor
- Alison Lohman – actress
- Anita Louise – film actress (Note: Anita Louise and Buddy Adler were spouses)
- Sid Luft – impresario and husband of Judy Garland
- Paul Lukas – actor
- Richard Lynch – actor
- Ali MacGraw – actress
- Patrick Macnee – actor
- Gordon MacRae – singer and actor
- Marjorie Main – character actress
- Caren Marsh Doll – actress and dancer
- Brenda Marshall – film actress
- Mary Martin – actress and singer (Note: Mary Martin died at her home in Rancho Mirage)
- Tony Martin – actor and singer
- Gummo Marx – vaudeville performer and theatrical agent; one of the Marx Brothers
- Zeppo Marx – comedian; one of the Marx Brothers
- Pat McCormick – actor and comedy writer
- Darren McGavin – actor
- Steve McQueen – actor
- Patricia Medina – actress
- Adolphe Menjou – film actor
- Duke Mitchell – film actor, slapstick comedian, crooner and film director (Note: Anointed himself as the "King of Palm Springs".)
- Joanna Moore – film and television actress
- Dorothy Morris – film and television actress
- Bret Morrison – radio performer, played The Shadow
- Gary Morton – actor, comedian and producer (Note: With spouse Lucille Ball)
- J. Carrol Naish – character actor
- Gloria Neil – actress
- Danny Sue Nolan – film actress
- Kim Novak – film actress
- Margaret O'Brien – film, television and stage actress
- Reginald Owen – character actor
- Eleanor Parker – film actress
- Fess Parker – television actor and winemaker
- Jean Parker – actress
- John Payne – actor
- Joan Perry – film actress, model and singer
- Jean Peters – film actress
- Lillian Porter – film and television actress
- William Powell – actor
- Stefanie Powers – actress
- Marjorie Rambeau – film and stage actress
- Frankie Randall – singer and actor
- Rhodes Reason – actor
- Donna Reed – actress (Note: Donna Reed was married to Tony Owen.)
- Phil Regan – actor and singer
- Fritzi Ridgeway – silent film star; built the Hotel del Tahquitz in 1928
- Maria Riva – actress
- Charles Knox Robinson III – actor
- Edward G. Robinson – actor
- Tristan Rogers – television actor
- Lillian Roth – actress, singer and autobiographer
- Peggy Ryan – dancer
- S. Z. "Cuddles" Sakall – actor
- Albert Salmi – actor
- Fred Leedon Scott – actor and singing cowboy
- Joe Seiders - musician, drummer for the band The New Pornographers
- Diane Shalet – stage and television character actress
- Tony Shalhoub – actor
- Alia Shawkat – actress
- Sammy Shore – comedian and founder of The Comedy Store
- Robin Shou – actor and martial arts specialist
- Red Skelton – radio and television comedian
- Suzanne Somers – actress (Note: Alan Hamel is the spouse and manager of Suzanne Somers)
- Sara Sothern – stage actress
- Richard Stapley – actor and writer
- Alana Stewart (aka Alana Collins) – actress
- Milburn Stone – actor
- Gloria Swanson – actress, singer and producer (Note: William Duffy and Gloria Swanson were spouses.)
- Akim Tamiroff – actor
- Robert Taylor – actor
- Rod Taylor – actor
- Tedi Thurman – actress and model (Miss Monitor)
- Kenneth Tobey – actor
- Spencer Tracy – actor
- June Travis – actress
- Rudolph Valentino – actor
- Virginia Valli – stage and film actress, manager of the Palm Springs Racquet Club (Note: Valli was married to Charles Farrell, who has a Star on the Palm Springs Walk of Stars.)
- Robert Wagner – actor
- Ralph Waite – actor and aspiring politician
- Nina Wayne – actress
- Jack Webb – actor, television writer, director and producer
- Adam West – actor
- Richard Whorf – actor, author, director, and designer
- Henry Wilcoxon – actor
- Cindy Williams – television actress
- Edy Williams – film and television actress
- Fred Williamson – actor and football player
- Noble Willingham – television and film actor
- Beverly Wills – television and film actress
- Demond Wilson – actor
- Charles Winninger – actor
- Joan Woodbury – actress
- Donald Woods – film and television actor

==== Silent film era ====
- Robert Agnew – silent film actor
- Fatty Arbuckle – silent film actor, comedian, director, and screenwriter
- Clara Bow – silent and sound film actress
- Billie Dove – silent film actress
- Neva Gerber – silent film actress
- Josephine Hill – silent film actress
- Lamar Johnstone – silent film actor
- Laura La Plante – silent film actress
- Harold Lloyd – comedic silent film actor and producer
- Jackie Saunders – silent film actress
- Anita Stewart – silent film heroine and film producer
- Ruth Taylor – silent film actress

==== Radio ====
- Harry Caray – baseball broadcaster on radio and television
- Charlie Correll – radio comedian famous for Amos 'n' Andy
- Bill Goodwin – radio announcer and actor
- Freeman Gosden – radio comedian famous for Amos 'n' Andy
- Dave Hull – radio personality
- Irving Kaufman – radio comedian who was "Lazy Dan, the Minstrel Man"
- Mary Livingstone – radio comedian (Note: Jack Benny and Mary Livingstone were spouses.)
- Al Lohman – radio personality
- Peter Tripp – radio personality
- Dick Whittinghill – radio disc jockey, movie and television actor, recording artist
- Don Wilson – announcer

=== Show business – production ===
- Al Adamson – film producer
- Irving Allen – stage and film producer and director
- Hy Averback – producer, director and actor
- Kroger Babb – film and television producer and showman
- Sydney Banks – producer
- Busby Berkeley – film director and musical choreographer
- Pandro S. Berman – film producer
- Josef Berne – film director
- Milton Bren – film producer and real estate developer
- Harry Joe Brown – film producer
- Allan Carr – stage and screen producer and manager
- Cameron Crowe – film director, producer and screenwriter
- Homer Curran – theater owner and Broadway producer
- Frank Daniel – film producer, screenwriter and director
- Edward Dmytryk – film director and editor
- George Englund – film director and producer
- Don Fedderson – television producer
- Bryan Foy – film producer and director
- Maurice Geraghty – screenwriter, film director and producer
- Menahem Golan – film director and producer
- Edmund Goulding – film writer and director
- Alexander Hall – film director and actor
- John Hamrick – theater entrepreneur
- Howard Hawks – film director, producer and screenwriter
- Paul Henning – television producer
- H. Bruce Humberstone – film director
- Gale Anne Hurd – film producer and screenwriter
- Stanley Kramer – film producer and director
- Norman Krasna – screenwriter, playwright, producer, and film director
- Sidney Lanfield – film and television director
- Jennings Lang – film director and screenwriter
- Walter Lang – film director
- Glen A. Larson – television producer and writer
- Irving "Swifty" Lazar – talent agent
- Mervyn LeRoy – film director and producer
- Sol Lesser – film producer
- Henry Levin – film director
- Frank Lloyd – film director, scriptwriter and producer (Note: Was one of the founders of the Academy of Motion Picture Arts and Sciences.)
- Riff Markowitz – producer and Emcee of The Fabulous Palm Springs Follies
- Harold Mirisch – film production company executive
- Victor Orsatti – talent agent and film producer
- Tony Owen – television producer
- William Perlberg – film producer
- William H. Pine – film producer
- Dave Powers – Emmy Award-winning television director and producer
- Steve Rowland – record producer
- Joseph M. Schenck – film studio executive
- Sherwood Schwartz – television producer
- William A. Seiter – film director
- Steve Sekely – film director
- David O. Selznick – film producer
- Edward Small – film producer
- Milton Sperling – film producer and screenwriter
- Leo Spitz – film executive
- John M. Stahl – film director and producer
- A. Edward Sutherland – film director and actor
- Norman Taurog – film director and screenwriter
- Norman Tokar – film and television director
- Mike Todd – theater and film producer
- Ivan Tors – producer
- Raoul Walsh – silent film actor, actor, and director
- Charles Walters – film director and choreographer
- James Whale – film and theatre director
- Jack Wrather – businessman and film producer
- William Wyler – film director, producer and screenwriter
- Sam Zimbalist – film producer

==== Cinematographers and art directors ====
- Lucien Andriot – cinematographer
- Arthur E. Arling – cinematographer
- Harper Goff – art director
- Milton R. Krasner – Academy Award-winning cinematographer
- Richard Moore – cinematographer
- Clifford Stine – cinematographer
- Robert L. Surtees – Academy Award-winning cinematographer
- Leo Tover – cinematographer

==== Studio executives ====
- Buddy Adler – 20th Century-Fox head of production (Note: Anita Louise and Buddy Adler were spouses.)
- Gregson Bautzer – Hollywood celebrity attorney
- Steve Broidy – studio executive
- Walt Disney – developer of Disneyland and The Walt Disney Company
- William Goetz – film producer and studio executive
- Samuel Goldwyn – film producer
- B. Donald "Bud" Grant – president of CBS Entertainment
- Kirk Kerkorian – film studio executive
- M. (Michael) C. Levee – prop man, studio executive, talent agent
- Robert L. Lippert – film producer and cinema chain owner
- Harry Warner – studio president
- Jack L. Warner – studio executive
- Sam Warner – film producer and studio founder
- Lew Wasserman – talent agent and studio executive
- Darryl F. Zanuck – producer, writer, actor, director and studio executive

=== Artists, architects and photographers ===
- Joseph Barbera – animator, director, producer, and cartoon artist
- Bill Belew – costume designer
- Bruno Bernard – Hollywood pin-up photographer
- Tom Bianchi – nude photographer
- Milton Caniff – cartoonist
- Dale Chihuly – glass sculptor and entrepreneur
- William Francis Cody – architect
- William S. Darling – Hollywood art director
- Maynard Dixon – early artist of the American West
- Paul Dougherty – artist
- James Galanos – fashion designer
- Christopher Georgesco – sculptor
- A. Arnold Gillespie – special effects artist
- Paul A. Grimm – artist
- Al Guest – animation producer
- Jean Howard – actress and photographer
- Charles LeMaire – costume designer
- Don Loper – costume and clothing designer
- Jean Louis – 1956 Academy Award winner for Costume Design (Note: Jean Louis was married to Loretta Young, who has a Star on the Palm Springs Walk of Stars.)
- Jean Mathieson – animator
- Agnes Lawrence Pelton – artist
- Reginald Pollack – painter
- William Gray Purcell – architect
- Helen Rose – costume and clothing designer
- Thom Ross – artist and book illustrator
- Robert Stokes – Disney animator
- Robert Stone – architect
- Burr Tillstrom – puppeteer and creator of Kukla, Fran and Ollie
- Colin Webster-Watson – New Zealand-born sculptor and poet
- Glen Wexler – photographer
- Monte Zucker – photographer

=== Academics and scientists, authors and writers ===
- Franz Alexander – psychoanalyst and physician
- Christopher Paul Baker – travel writer and photographer, and adventure motorcyclist
- Harold Bell Wright – writer
- Claude Binyon – screenwriter and director
- Irving Brecher – screenwriter
- Ray Bradbury – fantasy, horror, science fiction, and mystery writer
- Oscar Brodney – screenwriter
- George Bruce - pulp writer and screenwriter
- Robert Buckner – screenwriter, producer and short-story writer
- Carolyn Cassady – author
- Raymond Chandler – novelist and screenwriter
- Leslie Charteris – author and screenwriter
- Theodore Dru Alison Cockerell – zoologist
- Leonard Crofoot – author, singer, dancer and choreographer
- William Dufty – author
- Sergio Galindo – author
- Erle Stanley Gardner – author
- Zane Grey – author
- Moss Hart – playwright and theatre director
- Winston Hibler – screenwriter, film producer and director
- Michael Hickey – screenwriter
- Sam Hinton – folk singer, marine biologist, director of the Palm Springs Desert Museum
- Mildred Horn – film critic and screenwriter
- Monica Johnson – screenwriter and novelist
- Howard E. Koch – screenwriter
- Irving P. Krick – meteorologist
- Christopher Lewis – writer and television film producer
- Arthur Lyons – author
- Tom McCahill – automotive journalist
- Ray Mungo – author
- Andrew Neiderman – author
- Hank Plante – television reporter and editor
- Donald Prell – author and futurologist
- Thelma Pressman – microwave cooking consultant and author
- Martin Ragaway – screenwriter
- Harold Robbins – author
- Elroy Schwartz – comedy and screenwriter
- Jonathan Schwartz – author
- Katherine Siva Saubel – Native American scholar, tribal leader, author, and activist
- Frank Scully – columnist for Variety
- Sidney Sheldon – author and screenwriter
- Obert C. Tanner – professor of philosophy, philanthropist, and founder of O.C. Tanner Co.
- Anthony Veiller – screenwriter and film producer
- Dale Wasserman – playwright
- James R. Webb – screenwriter
- Paul Whiteman – bandleader and orchestral director
- Beatrice Willard – botanist
- Herman Wouk – Pulitzer Prize-winning author

=== Composers, musicians and singers ===
- eden ahbez – songwriter and recording artist
- Gitta Alpár – opera and operetta soprano
- Arcesia – jazz and popular singer
- Georgie Auld – jazz tenor saxophonist, clarinetist and bandleader
- Gene Austin – singer-songwriter
- B-Tight – gangsta rapper
- Les Baxter – musician and composer
- Sam Bettens – singer-songwriter
- Eric Burdon – Rock and Roll Hall of Fame member
- Champ Butler – singer
- Sammy Cahn – lyricist, songwriter and musician
- Gina Carey – singer and independent filmmaker
- Hoagy Carmichael – composer, pianist, singer, actor, and bandleader
- Kitty Carlisle – singer and actress
- John S. Carter – music producer, writer, arranger, instrumentalist and A&R man
- Cher – singer, television personality, actress, director, record producer and philanthropist
- John Crosby – conductor
- Brody Dalle – guitarist, singer-songwriter
- Billy Daniels – singer
- Bobby Darin – singer
- Mack David – songwriter
- Dennis Day – singer and Mouseketeer
- DJ Day – DJ, producer and musician
- Will Donato – smooth jazz composer, alto saxophonist and recording artist
- Paul Dunlap – composer
- George Feyer – classical pianist
- Eddie Fisher – singer
- Tennessee Ernie Ford – singer and television host
- Alan Freed – disc jockey
- Max Geldray – jazz harmonica player
- Lud Gluskin – jazz bandleader
- Gogi Grant – singer and performer at The Fabulous Palm Springs Follies
- Irving Green – founder and President of Mercury Records
- Dick Haymes – singer and actor
- Lennie Hayton – composer, conductor and arranger
- Jascha Heifetz – violinist
- Skip Heller – singer-songwriter and guitarist
- Bugs Henderson – blues guitarist
- Jerry Herman – composer and lyricist
- Tyler Hilton – singer-songwriter and actor
- George Jessel – singer-songwriter, actor and Academy Award winning producer
- Allan Jones – operatic tenor and actor
- Morgana King – jazz singer
- Andre Kostelanetz – symphony conductor (Note: Was married to operatic soprano Lily Pons)
- Ernst Krenek – composer
- Peggy Lee – singer
- Benjamin Lees – composer
- Liberace, composer, pianist, singer and entertainer - died at The Cloisters in Old Las Palmas district of Palm Springs
- George Liberace – violinist, singer and television performer, elder brother of Liberace
- Julie London – singer and actress
- Claudine Longet – singer, actress and dancer
- Frederick Loewe – composer
- Shelby Lynne – singer-songwriter
- DJ Lynnwood – club and radio DJ
- Barry Manilow – singer-songwriter and producer
- Dean Martin – singer, television and film actor and comedian
- Johnny Mercer – lyricist, songwriter and singer
- Irving Mills – jazz music publisher
- Carmen Miranda – samba singer and actress
- Hugo Montenegro – orchestra leader and film soundtrack composer
- Magnificent Montague – R&B disc jockey
- Jane Morgan – popular music singer
- Ben Pollack – drummer and bandleader
- Steve Poltz – singer-songwriter and guitarist
- Lily Pons – operatic soprano (Note: Was married to conductor Andre Kostelanetz)
- Louis Prima – singer-songwriter, actor, and trumpeter (Note: Was married to Keely Smith, who has a Star on the Palm Springs Walk of Stars)
- Ruggiero Ricci – virtuoso violinist
- Buddy Rich – jazz drummer and bandleader
- Chan Romero – rock and roll pioneer
- Ross Russell – jazz producer and author
- Roman Ryterband – Polish born composer, founded the Palm Springs Festival of Music and Art
- Paul Sawtell – composer
- Sia – singer-songwriter
- Frank Skinner – composer
- Keely Smith – singer
- Billy Steinberg – songwriter
- Miguelito Valdés – singer
- Jerry Vale – singer
- Frankie Valli – singer
- Jimmy Van Heusen – composer
- Billy Vaughn – singer, orchestra leader, musician, and talent scout
- Lawrence Welk – musician, accordionist, bandleader, and television impresario
- Kitty White – jazz vocalist
- Paul Whiteman – bandleader and orchestral director
- Earl Wild – pianist
- Victor Young – composer, arranger, violinist and conductor

=== Business figures ===
- George Argyros – real estate investor, MLB club owner, U.S. ambassador to Spain
- Edward J. DeBartolo Sr. – businessman
- Forrest Bird – aviator, inventor and biomedical engineer
- Ronald Burkle – business magnate and investor
- Dave Chasen – restaurant owner
- Mark Matthew Connelly – retired merchant and politician
- Lawrence Crossley – developer and entrepreneur
- George Cunningham – founder and owner of the Canadian Cunningham Drug chain
- Noah Dietrich – business executive
- Donald F. Duncan Sr. – founder of Duncan Toys Company
- Donald Wills Douglas Sr. – industrialist and founder of the Douglas Aircraft Company
- Max Factor Jr. – president of Max Factor Cosmetics
- Reuben H. Fleet – aviation pioneer, industrialist and army officer
- William Clay Ford Sr. – businessman
- Jolie Gabor – entrepreneur, jeweler, and memoirist
- King C. Gillette – invented the safety razor and founded the Gillette Safety Razor Co.
- Robert Halperin – Olympic yachting medalist, NFL football player, war hero, (Note: Received the Navy Cross.) businessman
- Paul Helms – founder of Helms Bakery and sports philanthropist
- Conrad Hilton – hotelier
- Howard Hughes – industrialist
- Herbert Fisk Johnson Jr. – president of S. C. Johnson & Son
- John H. Johnson – businessman and publisher
- Edgar J. Kaufmann – owner of Kaufmann's department stores (Note: The Kaufmann Desert House was designed by Richard Neutra.)
- Will Keith Kellogg – founder of the Kellogg Company
- Sidney Korshak – labor lawyer and reputed mob "fixer"
- Joan Kroc – founder and owner of McDonald's
- M. Larry Lawrence – U.S. ambassador to Switzerland
- Raymond Loewy – industrial designer
- William Secondo Lombardo – businessman, entrepreneur and philanthropist
- Oscar G. Mayer Jr. – owner of the Oscar Mayer meat company
- Maurice McDonald – with his brother Richard, established the first McDonald's
- Thomas A. O'Donnell – oil industry pioneer
- Max Palevsky – art collector, venture capitalist, philanthropist and technology pioneer
- Peter Pocklington – entrepreneur
- Milton Prell – Las Vegas developer and casino builder
- Jilly Rizzo – restaurateur and entertainer
- Ray Ryan – businessman, gambler, oilman, promoter and developer
- William Scholl – podiatrist and developer of Dr. Scholl's
- Wally Scott – aviator and author
- Chris Watts – inventor, businessman, film maker and visual effect supervisor

=== Civic, political and labor leaders and noted personalities ===
- Stan Barnes – college football player, lawyer and federal judge
- Susan Bernard – Playboy Playmate and actress
- William K. Boardman – Speaker of the Alaska House of Representatives
- Chaz Bono – transgender advocate, writer, and musician
- Mary Bono Mack – Member, U.S. House of Representatives
- Elaine Chaddick – socialite and kidnapping victim
- Harry Chaddick – real estate developer and husband of Elaine Chaddick
- Bert Corona – labor and civil rights leader
- Cheryl Crane – author, real estate agent, and only child of actress Lana Turner
- Ginny Foat – local politician and feminist
- Magda Gabor – socialite, actress and elder sister of Zsa Zsa and Eva Gabor
- Jazmin Grace Grimaldi – Paris Match cover girl and daughter of Albert II, Prince of Monaco
- Mel Haber, philanthropist restaurant owner (Melvyn's) and hotel proprietor (Ingleside Inn)
- Alan Hamel – children's television show host and corporate spokesperson
- Edward T. Hanley – labor leader
- Paul P. Harris – lawyer and founder of Rotary International
- George Randolph Hearst – publisher
- Patricia Hearst – heiress, actress, kidnapping victim and bank robber
- Robert Hertzberg – Speaker, California State Assembly
- Willits J. Hole – land developer and "Father of La Habra, California"
- Barbara Hutton – socialite and philanthropist (Note: Cary Grant and Barbara Hutton were spouses at the time)
- Cleve Jones – activist
- Hari Jiwan Singh Khalsa – Chief of Protocol for the American Sikh group Sikh Dharma
- Edgar L. McCoubrey – mayor
- David J. McDonald – president of the United Steelworkers of America
- Alejandro Mendoza – democratic socialist politician from Texas
- George Murphy – dancer, actor and United States Senator
- Harry Oliver – film producer and desert rat
- William Pester – "The Hermit of Palm Springs"
- Steve Pougnet – mayor
- Winthrop Rockefeller – governor of Arkansas (Note: Winthrop's former spouse, Jeanette, has a Star on the Palm Springs Walk of Stars)
- Michael Romanoff – Hollywood personality and restaurateur
- José Sarria – political and LGBT activist, drag queen
- Stefanie Schaeffer – lawyer and successful candidate on The Apprentice (season 6)
- Gregg Sherwood – socialite, actress and convicted embezzler
- Samuel Untermyer – lawyer and civic leader

=== Military personnel ===
- Jack Brennan – retired USMCR Colonel and political aide to President Nixon
- Leslie E. Brown – retired USMC Lt. General
- William L. Durkin – USMC Master Sergeant and rescuer of Howard Hughes from plane crash
- Thomas S. Power – retired USAF General
- Robert T. Smith – World War II fighter pilot
- Howard L. Vickery – U.S. naval officer and merchant shipbuilder

=== Sports and recreation figures ===
- Jackie Autry – owner of the Los Angeles Angels of Anaheim
- Ralph Backstrom – NHL hockey player
- Hugh Baiocchi – golfer
- George Bayer – golfer
- Morris Belzberg – businessman and National Hockey League team owner
- Susie Berning – golfer
- Johnny Blood – NFL football player
- Gypsy Boots – fitness pioneer, actor and writer who once lived in Tahquitz Canyon
- Timothy Bradley – boxer
- Álex Calatrava – tennis player
- John Carlos – Olympic track and field Bronze Medalist, world record sprinter (Note: Track and field coach at Palm Springs High School.)
- Frank Carroll – figure skating coach and skater
- Todd Clever – rugby union player
- Kevin Cogan – Formula One racing-car driver
- Chris Cormier – champion IFBB bodybuilder
- Fred Couples – golfer
- Johnny Dawson – golfer and golf course architect (Note: His wife Velma Wayne Dawson, has a Star on the Palm Springs Walk of Stars.)
- Jack Dempsey – professional boxer and cultural icon
- Helen Dettweiler – professional golfer
- Vicki Draves – Olympic Gold Medalist diver
- Leo Durocher – Major League Baseball player and manager
- Jack Elway – football player and head coach
- Mike "M.J." Frankovich – UCLA football player, film producer and sports promoter
- Vern Freiburger – Major League Baseball player
- Harry Grabiner – Major League Baseball team executive
- Fred Gehrke – football player
- Bob Goalby – golfer and sports commentator, winner of the 1968 Masters Tournament
- Werner Groebli – the "Frick" of Ice Follies figure skating team Frick and Frack
- Howie Haak – Major League Baseball scout
- Claude Harmon – golfer
- Carol Heiss – Olympic silver medalist and world champion figure skater and actress
- José Higueras – tennis coach and player
- Willie Hunter – golfer
- Travis Jonas – poker player and winner of a WSOP bracelet
- Rod Kanehl – baseball player
- Frankie Kazarian – AEW and TNA wrestler
- Ralph Kiner – Major League Baseball player and announcer for the New York Mets
- Jack LaLanne – fitness instructor and television exercise guru
- Stan Leonard – golfer
- Lynette Lim – Olympic swimmer and Asian Youth Games gold medalist
- Dick Mayer – golfer
- Harley McCollum – NFL football player
- Daisuke Murakami – figure skater
- Jack Nichols – basketball player and dentist
- Mac O'Grady – golfer
- Pete Reiser – Major League Baseball player
- Jack Renner – golfer
- Johnny Revolta – golfer
- Ronnie Robertson – Olympic Silver Medal figure skater
- Bob Rosburg – golfer
- Sandra Rucker – 2005 U.S. Junior Figure Skating Champion
- Glen Sather – National Hockey League general manager and head coach
- Howard Schenken – contract bridge champion and author
- Dale Scott - Major League Baseball Umpire and author
- Brian Serven (born 1995), Major League Baseball catcher
- York Shackleton – snowboarder and actor
- Frank Shields – tennis player
- Byron Smith – golfer (Note: Smith now lives in Palm Desert.)
- Bobby Specht – figure skater
- Cub Swanson – UFC mixed martial artist
- Chris Truby – Major League Baseball player
- Phil Weintraub – Major League Baseball player
- Russell White – National Football League player
- Frank Zane – three time Mr. Olympia

=== Underworld (criminal) figures ===
- Anthony "Big Tuna" Accardo – mobster
- Joey "The Dove" Aiuppa – mobster
- Jim Bakker – televangelist, convicted of fraud
- Frank "The Horse" Buccieri – mobster
- Vincent Dominic "Jimmy" Caci – mobster
- Jackie Cerone – Chicago mobster
- Glen Stewart Godwin – FBI Ten Most Wanted Fugitive (Note: Dropped from the list in 2016, but still at large as 2017)
- Sante Kimes – murderer
- Tom Neal – actor, convicted of manslaughter
- Michael Rizzitello – mobster
- James "The Turk" Torello – mobster

== Coachella Valley residents ==
=== Bermuda Dunes ===
- Rich Newey – multi-media director

=== Cathedral City ===
- Carroll Baker – actress (and spouse of Donald Burton)
- Donald Burton – theatre and television actor
- Marceline Day – actress
- Lalo Guerrero – musician, composer, and actor
- Dorothy Harrell – All-American Girls Professional Baseball League player
- Simon Oakland – actor
- Agnes Lawrence Pelton – German-American artist
- Jeremy Thornburg – football player

=== Coachella ===
- Jim Criner – football player
- Julio Díaz – boxer, IBF lightweight champion
- Steve Howe – baseball player
- Malverde – artist
- Alan O'Day – singer-songwriter
- V. Manuel Perez – politician

=== Desert Hot Springs ===
- John L. Gaunt – 1955 Pulitzer Prize winner for Photography
- Janet Gaynor – actress and painter
- Gus Henderson – football coach
- Knute Hill – United States Representative from the state of Washington
- Noel Langley – novelist, playwright, screenwriter and director
- Robert McAlmon – author, poet and publisher
- Jerome Storm – film director, actor and writer
- Joan Woodbury – actress
- Cabot Yexra – early homesteader and builder of Cabot's Pueblo Museum
- Rick Zumwalt – professional world champion arm-wrestler and actor

=== Indio ===
- Vanessa Marcil – actress
- Tony Reagins – Major League Baseball manager
- John Van Druten – English playwright and theatre director
- Edward White – football player

=== Indian Wells ===
- Ernest E. Debs – Los Angeles City Council member and Los Angeles County supervisor
- Charles Koch – businessman
- Don Fairfield – golfer
- James Frawley – film and television director
- Bill and Melinda Gates – Microsoft CEO and philanthropists
- Colleen Kay Hutchins – Miss America (1952) and wife of Ernie Vandeweghe
- Arthur Lake – actor
- W. Howard Lester – businessman
- Charles Peebler – advertising executive
- Charles H. Price II – businessman and ambassador
- Greg and Stacey Renker – founders of Guthy-Renker and philanthropists
- Tommy Shepard – trombonist and orchestra leader
- Ernie Vandeweghe – physician, U.S. Air Force veteran and basketball player; husband of Colleen Kay Hutchins
- Sam B. Williams – inventor and businessman
- John Wilson – golfer

=== La Quinta ===
- Dorothy Arzner – pioneer woman film director
- Frank Capra – film director
- Clint Eastwood – actor, businessman and politician
- Tod Goldberg – novelist and teacher (born in Palm Springs; lives in La Quinta)
- Merv Griffin – television host, musician, actor and media mogul
- Dorothy Hamill – Olympic figure skater
- Jack Jones – singer
- Philip Knight – business magnate and philanthropist
- Oscar Lua – football player
- Aubrey O'Day – singer, actress, fashion designer and television personality
- Kyle Richards – actress, reality star: Real Housewives of Beverly Hills
- Tony Robbins – motivational speaker and author
- Barbara Seranella – author
- Andy Williams – singer
- Ernie Vossler – golfer and golf course developer

=== Palm Desert ===
- William Asher – television writer and director
- Jenna Ortega - Actress with TV Series Netflix Wednesday
- John Aylesworth – television writer, producer and actor
- Ted Bank – football player, coach and athletic director
- Max Bell – newspaper publisher, race horse owner and philanthropist
- William Boyd – actor
- Nicole Castrale – professional golfer
- Richard Clayton – actor and talent agent
- Maureen Daly – author
- Adolph Deutsch – composer, conductor and arranger
- Ági Donáth – child actress, business woman and socialite
- Ellen Drew – film actress
- Eddie Elguera – skateboarder and minister
- Tom Fears – Hall of Fame American football player and coach
- Virginia Field – British film actress
- Leonard Firestone – business man and developer
- John Ford – film director
- John Garcia – singer
- Jack Garner – actor
- Brent Geiberger – golfer
- Norris Goff – radio and film comedian
- Buddy Greco – singer, pianist and nightclub owner (Buddy Greco's Dinner Club)
- Mary Hart – host of Entertainment Tonight
- Goldie Hawn – actress
- Cliff Henderson – organizer of the National Air Races
- Kathy Hite – professional golfer
- Eddy Howard – vocalist and bandleader
- Rochelle Hudson – actress
- Jesse Hughes – musician
- Tab Hunter – actor
- Barry Jaeckel – professional golfer
- Herb Jeffries – singer and actor known as the "Bronze Buckaroo" cowboy
- Barbara Kent – actress
- Forrest Kline – singer-songwriter and musician
- Nancy Kulp – actress
- Leonard Landy – Our Gang child actor
- Rowland V. Lee – film director, writer and producer
- George A. Lingo – artist and Alaska politician
- Alice Marble – 1930s tennis Grand Slam champion
- Marian Marsh – actress
- Peter Marshall – original host of The Hollywood Squares
- Michael Masser – songwriter, composer and producer
- Patsy Ruth Miller – film actress
- Alvy Moore – film and television comedian
- Brian Nestande – politician
- Catherine Ponder – author and minister
- Steve Previn – director
- Queens of the Stone Age – American rock band, members include:
  - Josh Homme (founder; Palm Desert Scene musician and promoter of The Desert Sessions)
  - Troy Van Leeuwen
  - Joey Castillo
  - Michael Shuman
  - Dean Fertita
- Ronnie Robertson – figure skater
- Kurt Russell – actor
- Frederick Swann – organist
- Ian Flannon Taylor – musician
- Herbert R. Temple Jr. – retired United States National Guard Lt. General
- Jerry Vale – singer
- David Wachs – actor and musician
- Margaret Wenzell – professional baseball player
- Paul Winchell – ventriloquist, voice actor, comedian, inventor
- Paul Zastupnevich – costume designer

=== Rancho Mirage ===
- Stuart Anderson – restaurateur
- Leonore Annenberg – businesswoman, philanthropist and Chief of Protocol of the United States (also lived in Palm Springs)
- Walter Annenberg – publisher, philanthropist and United States Ambassador to the United Kingdom (also lived in Palm Springs)
- Tammy Faye Bakker – singer, evangelist, entrepreneur, author and television personality (Note: Tammy Faye Bakker and Roe Messner were spouses.)
- Kaye Ballard – actress
- Lucien Ballard – cinematographer and director of photography
- Frank Bank – Leave It to Beaver actor and later bond broker
- Johnny Bench – MLB catcher
- Isabel Bigley – Tony Award winning actress
- Tim Blixseth – real estate developer, record producer, songwriter and timber baron
- Barbara Boxer – United States Senator
- Harry Caray – sportscaster (the "voice of the Chicago Cubs")
- Joseph Coors – chemical engineer, philanthropist, Coors Beer brewer, founder and financer of The Heritage Foundation
- Broderick Crawford – actor
- Coco Crisp – MLB player (family lives in Desert Hot Springs)
- Larry Ellison – business magnate and CEO of Oracle Corporation
- Chris Evert – tennis player
- Gerald Ford – 38th president of the United States
- Jacqueline Gagne – golfer
- Helene and Lou Galen – philanthropists
- Donald Holmquest – astronaut and physician
- Don Hutson – football wide receiver
- Gregg Juarez – art dealer, gallerist and philanthropist
- Ralph Kiner – baseball player and broadcaster
- Tim LaHaye – evangelical Christian minister, author, and speaker
- Catherine Dean May – member of Congress
- Rachel McLish – bodybuilding champion, actress, and author (Note: Rachel McLish and Ron Samuels were spouses.)
- Roe Messner – megachurch builder (Note: Tammy Faye Bakker and Roe Messner were spouses.)
- Ann Meyers – basketball player and sportscaster
- Jerry Moe – author
- Anne Rice – author
- Ginger Rogers – dancer and actress
- Al Rosen – baseball player and baseball executive
- Ron Samuels – producer (Note: Ron Samuels and Rachel McLish were spouses)
- Dinah Shore – singer and actress
- Frank Sinatra – singer and actor
- Lee Surkowski – All-American Girls Professional Baseball League baseball player
- Hal B. Wallis – film producer and writer
- Joseph Wambaugh – novelist
- Terry Wilcox – tournament director for the Kraft Nabisco Championship

=== Thermal ===
- William Devane – actor

== See also ==
- List of mayors of Palm Springs, California
