= 30th GMA Dove Awards =

1999 US music awards ceremony

- Date: March 24, 1999
- Location: Nashville Arena, Nashville, Tennessee
- Hosted by: John Tesh

Television/radio coverage
- Network: Syndicated to certain markets only

The 30th Annual GMA Dove Awards were held on March 24, 1999, recognizing accomplishments of musicians for the year 1998. The show was held at the Nashville Arena in Nashville, Tennessee, and was hosted by John Tesh.

== Nominees ==
Winners are listed in bold type.

=== Main categories ===
==== Song of the Year ====
- "Adonai"; Stephanie Lewis, Lorraine Ferro, Don Koch, Sparrow Songs (BMI), Word Music, First Verse Music, Chalante Music (ASCAP)
- "Deeper"; Martin Smith, Stuart Gerrard; Curious Music (UK), Birdwing Music
- "Entertaining Angels"; Jody Davis, Peter Furler, Phil Joel; Helmet Publishing (BMI), Dawn Treader Music (SESAC), Shepherd's Fold Music (BMI)
- "God So Loved"; Chris Eaton; SGO Music Publishing, Bug Music Inc.(BMI)
- "I Believe In Christ"; Jonathan Pierce, Steve Plunkett, Denise Hildreath; Mike Curb Music (BMI), Sofa and Chair Music (BMI), Plunk Songs (BMI)
- "Live The Life"; Michael W. Smith, Brent Bourgeois; Milene Music, Inc./ Deer Valley Music (ASCAP), W.B.M. Music Corp/ADC Music/Edinburg Songs (SESAC)
- "Mercy Said No"; Don Koch, Dave Clark, Greg Long; Word Music, Dayspring Music, Definitive Music (BMI), First Verse Music (ASCAP), Inferataste Music, Curline Music (ASCAP)
- **"My Deliverer"**; Rich Mullins, Mitch McVicker; Liturgy Legacy Music, Word Music (ASCAP), White Plastic Bag Music (SESAC)
- "Testify To Love"; Paul Field, Henk Pool, Ralph VanManen, Robert Riekerk; Windswept Music, the Netherlands (ASCAP)
- "Undo Me"; Jennifer Knapp; Gotee Music, West Hudson Music (BMI)
- "We Fall Down"; Kyle Matthews; BMG Songs (ASCAP), Above The Rim Music (ASCAP)

==== Songwriter of the Year ====
- Joel Lindsey
- Toby McKeehan
- Cindy Morgan
- **Rich Mullins**
- Michael W. Smith

==== Male Vocalist of the Year ====
- Steven Curtis Chapman
- Jonathan Pierce
- Bob Carlisle
- **Chris Rice**
- Michael W. Smith

==== Female Vocalist of the Year ====
- Jennifer Knapp
- Crystal Lewis
- Rebecca St. James
- Kathy Troccoli
- **Jaci Velasquez**

==== Group of the Year ====
- Avalon
- DC Talk
- Delirious?
- Newsboys
- **Point of Grace**

==== Artist of the Year ====
- Avalon
- DC Talk
- Point of Grace
- **Michael W. Smith**
- Jaci Velasquez

==== New Artist of the Year ====
- All Star United
- Burlap to Cashmere
- **Jennifer Knapp**
- Nichole Nordeman
- Michelle Tumes

==== Producer of the Year ====
- Brown Bannister
- Brent Bourgeois
- Kirk Franklin
- Toby McKeehan
- **Michael W. Smith**

=== Pop/Contemporary ===
==== Song of the Year ====
- "Basic Instructions"; Anybody Out There?; Burlap To Cashmere; Steven Delopoulos, John Philippidis; Squint Entertainment
- "God So Loved"; Jaci Velázquez, Jaci Velasquez, Chris Eaton, Myrrh Records
- "I Believe In Christ"; Mission; Jonathan Pierce; Jonathan Pierce, Steve Plunkett, Denise Hildreath; Curb Records
- "Steady On"; Steady On; Point of Grace; Grant Cunningham, Matt Huesmann; Word Records
- "**Testify To Love**"; A Maze of Grace; Avalon; Paul Field, Henk Pool, Ralph Van Manen, Robert Riekerk; Sparrow Records

==== Album of the Year ====
- A Maze of Grace; Avalon; Charlie Peacock, Chris Harris; Sparrow Records
- **Live the Life**; Michael W. Smith; Mark Heimermann, Michael W. Smith, Stephen Lipson; Reunion Records
- Steady On; Point of Grace; Brown Bannister; Word Records
- Supernatural; dc Talk; Toby McKeehan, Mark Heimermann; ForeFront Records
- The Jesus Record; Rich Mullins and A Ragamuffin Band; Rick Elias; Myrrh Records

=== Inspirational ===
==== Album of the Year ====
- **Corner of Eden**; Kathy Troccoli; Nathan DiGesare; Reunion Records
- Dream Big; The Martins; Phil Naish, Michael Sykes; Spring Hill
- Gospel; Michael English; Michael English, Jay DeMarcus; Curb
- Perennial Songs For The Seasons Of Life; Twila Paris; Brown Bannister for RBI Productions; Sparrow Records
- The Breaking Of The Dawn; Fernando Ortega; John Andrew Schreiner; Myrrh Records

==== Song of the Year ====
- "**Adonai**"; A Maze of Grace; Avalon; Stephanie Lewis, Lorraine Ferro, Don Koch; Sparrow Records
- "Farther Than Your Grace Can Reach"; Mission; Jonathan Pierce; Connie Harrington, Steve Siler; Curb Records
- "Gloria"; Watermark; Watermark; Nathan and Christy Nockels; Rocketown Records
- "Psalm 23"; Corner of Eden; Kathy Troccoli; Kathy Troccoli, Nathan DiGesare; Reunion Records
- "When The Wind Blows"; Steady On; Point of Grace; Chuck Hargett, Word Records

=== Southern gospel ===
==== Album of the Year ====
- Faithful; Cathedrals; Bill Gaither, Lari Goss, Roger Bennett; Homeland
- Rhythm & Rhyme; Poet Voices; Chris White; Sonlite Records
- **Still The Greatest Story Ever Told**; Gaither Vocal Band; Bill Gaither, Michael Sykes, Guy Penrod; Spring Hill
- That Says It All; George Younce; Vic Clay, Toni Clay; Spring Hill
- They Gave The World A Smile, The Stamps Quartet Tribute Album; James Blackwood Quartet, Light Crust Doughboys; James Blackwood, Art Greenhaw, Marvin Montgomery; Light Crust Doughboys Records

==== Song of the Year ====
- "Born Again"; Sweet Life; Janet Paschal; Public Domain; Spring Hill
- "He Made A Change"; Faithful; The Cathedrals; Joel Lindsey, Ernie Haase; Homeland
- "**I Believe In A Hill Called Mount Calvary**"; Lovin' God and Lovin' Each Other; Gaither Vocal Band; William J. Gaither, Gloria Gaither; Spring Hill
- "In Time, On Time, Every Time"; Within the Rock; Gold City; Belinda Smith; Daywind Records
- "One Holy Lamb"; Rhythm & Rhyme; Poet Voice; Phil Cross; Sonlite

=== Country ===
==== Album of the Year ====
- **A Work In Progress**; Jeff and Sheri Easter; Michael Sykes; Spring Hill
- In The Middle Of It All; David L. Cook; Mickey Hiter, David L. Cook, Jeff McKee; Mountainview Records, DLC Records
- In My Life; Larry Gatlin; Larry Gatlin, Michael G. Smith; Spring Hill
- Increase My Faith; The Isaacs; Ben Isaacs; Horizon Records
- The Lewis Bunch; The Lewis Family; Buddy Spicher, Wayne Haun, The Lewis Family; Thorough Bred Records

==== Song of the Year ====
- "Been There, Done That"; A Work In Progress; Jeff and Sheri Easter; Jerry Salley, C. Aaron Wilburn; Spring Hill
- "**Count Your Blessings**"; Dream Big; The Martins; Kim Patton-Johnston, Joe Johnston; Spring Hill
- "He Chose To Wear The Crown"; Rabbit Easter Band featuring Stan Dailey; Rabbit Easter Band; Peggy Newman, Michael Puryear; Daywind
- "Heaven Will Be My Home"; Heaven Will Be My Home; Walt Mills; Walt Mills; Homeland
- "Whispers In My Heart"; Tender Road Home; Susie Luchsinger; Billy Aerts, Claire Cloninger; New Haven

=== Bluegrass ===
==== Album of the Year ====
Insufficient amount of eligible entries.

==== Song of the Year ====
- "Till The Last Leaf Shall Fall"; Gospel Radio Gems; Doyle Lawson & Quicksilver; Sonny James, Jack Rhodes; Suger Hill Records
- "**He Still Looks Over Me**"; The Lewis Bunch; The Lewis Family; Mike Richards, Rodney Lay Jr; Thoroughbred Records
- "I Dreamed I Drove the Nails"; Feel Good Day; Continental Divide; Jeff Silvery, Larry Williams, Kim Williams; Pinecastle Records
- "Peace Like a River"; Gospel Radio Gems; Doyle Lawson & Quicksilver; W.B. Walbert, James D. Walbert; Suger Hill Records
- "The Old Love Letter"; New Highway; Larry Sparks; Pam Gremillion; Mountain Home
- "Who Will Pray For Me"; Our Point Of View; New Coon Creek Girls featuring Dale Ann Bradley; Dale Ann Bradley, Ramona Church Taylor; Pinecastle Records

=== Traditional gospel ===
==== Album of the Year ====
- Bow Down And Worship Him; Full Gospel Baptist Fellowship Mass Choir; Percy Bady; Gospo Centric
- **Christmas With Shirley Caesar**; Shirley Caesar; Steven Ford, Shirley Caesar; Myrrh Records Black Music Division
- My Soul Feels Better Right Now; Della Reese; Franklin Lett; Homeland
- Now That I'm Here; Beverly Crawford; Dan Cleary; Warner Alliance
- So Good; Colorado Mass Choir featuring Joe Pace; Rudolph Stanfield, Paul Wright III, Joe Pace II; Verity Records

==== Song of the Year ====
- "**Is Your All On The Altar?**"; Songs From The Heart; Yolanda Adams; Elisha Hoffman, Percy Bady, Yolanda Adams; Verity Records
- "Jesus I Won't Forget"; 50 Blessed Years; Rev. Milton Brunson's Thompson Community Singers; Percy Gray; Myrrh Records Black Music Div.
- "Just A Closer Walk With Thee"; Just Churchin'; Bobby Jones & New Life with The Nashville Super Choir; PD, arrangement by Derrick Lee; Gospo Centric
- "So Good"; So Good; Colorado Mass Choir featuring Joe Pace; Percy Bady; Verity Records
- "Thank You Lord (He Did It All)"; Strength; The New Life Community Choir featuring John P. Kee; John P. Kee; Verity Records

=== Contemporary gospel ===
==== Album of the Year ====
- Conversations; Greg O'Quinn 'n Joyful Noyze; Greg O'Quin, James Moss, Paul D. Allen; Myrrh Records
- Everlasting Love; CeCe Winans; Keith Crouch, Chakdaddy, Babyboy, E. Dank, Tony Rich, Tommy Simms, Cedric Caldwell, Victor Caldwell, Sibusiso Victor Masando, CeCe Winans, Eric Dawkins, Daryl Simmons, Lauryn Hill; Sparrow Records, Pioneer Music Group
- **Nu Nation Project**; Kirk Franklin; Kirk Franklin; Gospo Centric
- Pages of Life Chapters I & II; Fred Hammond & Radical For Christ; Fred Hammond, Paul Wright III; Verity Records
- So Cool; Take 6; Take 6, Jim Ed Norman, George Duke; Reprise Records

==== Song of the Year ====
- "I Told The Storm"; Conversations; Greg O'Quin 'N Joyful Noyze; Greg O'Quin; Myrrh Records Black Music Division
- "Jesus Is All"; Pages of Life Chapters I & II; Fred Hammond & Radical For Christ; Fred Hammond; Verity Records
- "**Let The Praise Begin**"; Pages of Life Chapters I & II; Fred Hammond & Radical For Christ; Fred Hammond; Verity Records
- "Love Wouldn't"; I Get Lifted; Kelli Williams; Kelli Williams; Word Gospel
- "Your Steps Are Ordered"; Pages of Life Chapters I & II; Fred Hammond & Radical for Christ; Fred Hammond, Radical for Christ; Verity Records

=== Rap/Hip Hop/Dance ===
==== Album of the Year ====
- Glory 2 Glory; Lil' Raskull; Stephen Thomas; Grapetree Records
- **Heatseeker**; The World Wide Message Tribe; Zarc Porter; Warner Resound
- Pawns In A Chess Game; God's Original Gangstaz; Sonny Formato, Kevin G; Grapetree Records
- Tears Of A Gansta; Preachas In Tha Hood; Adrian Sandoval, Arthur Sandoval; Grapetree Records
- The Return; E-Roc; Blake Knight; Grapetree Records
- Welcome To The New Era; K·II·S; New Era Productions, Brian Ray; Metro One

==== Song of the Year ====
- "After the Rain"; Welcome to the New Era; K·II·S; Donald Newman; Metro One
- "Everything I Need"; Heatseeker; The World Wide Message Tribe; Dante, Pennells, Porter; Warner Resound
- "God Is In Control"; Godzhouse.com – The Compilation; DelaRay; Dell Ray; CMN Records
- "Hide"; The Echoing Green; The Echoing Green; j xhan; 5 Minute Walk, Sarabellum
- "**Plagiarism**"; Factors of the Seven; Grits; T.Carter, S.Jones, T. Collins, R. Robbins; Gotee Records

=== Urban ===
==== Album of the Year ====
Insufficient amount of eligible entries.

==== Song of the Year ====
- "Can't Let Go"; More Than You Know; Out of Eden; L. Bragg, M. Bragg; Gotee Records
- "Fly Away"; So Cool; Take 6; Cedric Dent; Reprise Records
- "Grace & Mercy"; Grace & Mercy; Marvin Sapp; Percy Bady; Word Gospel
- "In The Midst Of The Rain"; BeBe Winans; BeBe Winans; BeBe Winans, Cedric Caldwell, Victor Caldwell; Sparrow Records, Atlantic Records
- "**Revolution**"; Nu Nation Project; Kirk Franklin; Kirk Franklin, Rodney Jerkins; Gospo centric

=== Rock ===
==== Album of the Year ====
- **Anybody Out There?**; Burlap To Cashmere; Jay Healy, David Rolfe; Squint Entertainment
- Kansas; Jennifer Knapp; Mark Stuart; Gotee Records
- King of Fools; Delirious?; Andy Piercy, Delirious?; Sparrow Records
- Some Kind of Zombie; Audio Adrenaline; John Hampton; ForeFront Records
- Step Up to the Microphone; Newsboys; Peter Furler; Star Song Records

==== Song of the Year ====
- "Agnus Dei"; Exodus; Third Day; Michael W. Smith; Rocketown Records
- "Butterfly"; Seven Day Jesus; Seven Day Jesus; Brian McSweeney, Douglas Kaine McKelvey; ForeFront Records
- "Hands In The Air"; The Waitin; The Waiting; Brad Olsen, Todd Olsen, Steve Hindalong, Clark Leake; Sparrow Records
- "My Friend (So Long)"; Supernatural; DC Talk; Toby McKeehan, Michael Tait, Kevin Max, Mark Hudson, Dominick Miller; ForeFront Records
- "**Undo Me**"; Kansas; Jennifer Knapp; Jennifer Knapp, Gotee Records

=== Modern rock/alternative ===
==== Song of the Year ====
- "Blitz"; Some Kind of Zombie; Audio Adrenaline with Special Guest Supertones; Bob Herdman, Will McGinniss, Mark Stuart; ForeFront Records
- "La La Land"; All Star United; All Star United; Doug McKelvey, Ian Eskelin, Essential Records, Reunion Records
- "Super Good Feeling"; Static; Bleach; Brad Ford, Matt Gingerich Sam Barnhart, Todd Kirby, David Baysinger; ForeFront Records
- "**The Devil Is Bad**"; Fourth From The Last; The W's; Andrew Schar, Todd Gruener, James Carter, Brian Morris, Val Hellman, Bret Barker; 5 Minute Walk, Sarabellum
- "Underwater"; The Legend of Chin; Switchfoot; Jonathan Foreman, Casey Gee; re:think Records

==== Album of the Year ====
- Am I Pretty?; Skypark; Thom Roy; Word Records
- **Fourth From The Last**; The W's; Masaki Liu; 5 Minute Walk, Sarabellum
- Hey You, I Love Your Soul; Skillet; Skidd Mills; Ardent/ForeFront
- Vegas Car Chasers; Silage; Todd Collins; Essential Records
- Water; Between Thieves; Steve Hindalong; Tattoo Records, Benson

=== Hard music ===
==== Album of the Year ====
- Bananaman; Ghoti Hook; Kevin 131; Tooth & Nail Records
- **Brightblur**; Massivivid; Wally Shaw, Mark Nash; Tattoo Records, Benson
- On Your Feet; Spoken; Dan Garcia, Brian Ray; Metro One
- Project 86; Project 86; Bryan Carlstrom, Project 86; BEC Recordings
- Where Blood & Fire Bring Rest; Zao; Bruce Fitzhugh, Jason Magnuson; Solid State

==== Song of the Year ====
- "**Awesome God**"; Skalleluia; The Insyderz; Rich Mullins with additional lyrics by Joe Yerke; Squint Entertainment
- "Locked In A Cage"; Hey You, I Love Your Soul; Skillet; John Cooper; Ardent/ForeFront
- "On Your Feet"; On Your Feet; Spoken; Spoken; Metro One
- "Pain"; Flying; Grammatrain; Pete Stewart, Paul Roraback, Dalton Roraback; ForeFront
- "Salt Circles"; American Standard; Every Day Life; Todd Cookerly; KMG Records, Alarma

=== Others ===
==== Instrumental Album of the Year ====
- **Acoustic Sketches**; Phil Keaggy; Phil Keaggy, John August Schroeter; Sparrow Records
- Christmas Sax; Sam Levine; Jeck Jezzro; Spring Hill
- Epic Tales of Whoa!; Tony Palacios; Tony Palacios, Grover Jackson; Cadence Communications Group
- Grand Passion; John Tesh; John Tesh; GTSP, Word Records
- The Gospel According to Jazz; Kirk Whalum; Kirk Whalum, Tyrone Dickerson; Warner Gospel

==== Praise & Worship Album of the Year ====
- Acoustic Worship: 25 of Your Favorite Praise and Worship Songs; Various; Provident
- **Focus On The Family presents Renewing The Heart Live Hymns and Songs of Worship**; Kim Hill; David Zaffiro, Kim Hill; Star Song Records
- Freedom; Darrell Evans; Paul Mills; Vertical Music
- God Came Near; Max Lucado, Jeff Nelson, Dennis Jernigan, John G. Elliott, Lisa Lopez; Glenn Wagner; Here To Him Music
- Skalleluia; Insyderz; Gene Eugene, Insyderz; Squint

==== Children's Music Album of the Year ====
- America's 25 Praise & Worship Choruses For Kids; David Lyndon Huff; Brentwood Kids Co.
- Bible Action Songs; Bob Singleton; Everland Entertainment
- Butterfly Kisses & Bedtime Prayers; Various; Dennis Patton; Benson
- Hide 'Em In Your Heart – Praise and Worship for Kids; Steve Green; Sparrow Records; Frank Hernandez
- **Veggie Tunes 2; Veggie Tales**; Kurt Heinecke, David Mullen; Big Idea Productions

==== Spanish Language Album of the Year ====
- Avivanos; XXXIIIDC; Alejandro Allen, Lenny LeBlanc; Hosanna! Music
- Entrare' a Jerusalen; Rene Gonzalez; Mark Gasbarro, Alejandro Allen; Hosanna! Music
- **Libertad Me Das** (tie); Sandi Patty; Isaac Hernandez, Greg Nelson; Word International
- Me Regalo; Marcos Vidal; Marcos Vidal, Alejandro Allen; Piedra Angular
- **Oro** (tie); Crystal Lewis; Brian Ray, Dan Posthuma; Metro One

==== Special Event Album of the Year ====
- Artists Acappella: First Call, Cindy Morgan, Mark Lowry, Babbie Mason, John Elefante, Ron Kenoly, Dallas Holm, Michael O'Brien, Bruce Carroll, David L Cook, The Martins; Darrell Bledsoe, Jeff Nelson;
- **Exodus**; dcTalk, Jars of Clay, Sixpence None the Richer, Cindy Morgan, Chris Rice, The Katinas, Third Day, Crystal Lewis, Michael W. Smith; Michael W. Smith. (Rocketown Records)
- Surfonic Water Revival: New Surf Music for the Redeemed Masses: Smalltown Poets with Paul Johnson, Brother's Keeper with Phil Keaggy, The Insyderz, Chuck Girard with Paul Johnson, Plumb, Terry Scott Taylor, PlankEye, Randy Stonehill with Havalina Rail Co., Danial Amos, Rebecca St. James, Silage, All Star United with Phil Keggy, Rick Altizer, Skillet (band), The O.C.Supertones.
- Lost Dogs with Rich Young Ruler: Terry Taylor (KMG Records)
- Touched by an Angel: Della Reese and the Vertical All-Stars, Celine Dion, God's Property, Wynonna, The Kinleys, Deana Carter, Bob Dylan, Amanda Marshall, Shawn Colvin, Imani Coppola, Uncle Sam, Keb' Mo, Amy Grant, Martina McBride, Faith Hill, Jaci Velasquez; Keith Thomas, Paul Worley. (Myrrh Records)
- Tribute to Dottie Rambo: The Kingdom Heirs, Squire Parsons, Karen Peck and New River, Sonya Isaacs Surrett, Tim Surrett, Amy Lambert, Kirk Talley, The Talley Trio, Phil Cross & Poet Voices, The Perry Sisters, The Hoppers; Phil Cross, Jeff Collins, Chris White. (Crossroads Records)

==== Musical of the Year ====
- Glory! Another Soulful Celebration of the Season; Dave Williamson; Brentwood-Benson Music Publishing
- God For Us; Don Moen, Jack Hayford, Tom Fettke, Camp Kirkland, Randy Vader, Jay Rouse; Integrity Music, Praise Gathering
- He Is Still The King of Kings; Mosie Lister; Lillenas
- **Mary Did You Know?**; David Guthrie, Bruce Greer; Word Music
- The Christmas Post; Deborah Craig-Claar, Robert Sterling; Word Music

==== Youth/Children's Musical of the Year ====
- **2 Extreme!**; Steven V. Taylor; Brentwood-Benson Music Publishing
- A Lamb's Tale; Martha Bolton, Dennis Allen
- A Star Is Born; Celeste Clydesdale; Word Music
- The Ultimate Youth Choir Book 2; David Guthrie, Bruce Cokeroft, Robert Sterling, Steven V. Taylor, Rob Howard, Dennis Allen; Word Music
- WWW.Christmasonline.com; Nancy Gordon, John Chisum; Dovetail Music, Genevox

==== Choral Collection of the Year ====
- A Mighty Fortress, Ken Barker, Malcolm DuPlesis; Word Music
- **Peace Speaker**, Geron Davis; Brentwood-Benson Music Publishing
- Songs From The Altar, Carol Cymbala; Word Music
- The Worship Library, Vol. 2, David Guthrie, Bruce Cokeroft; Word Music
- Victory In Jesus!, Tom Ferrke, Billy Ray Hearn; Lillenas

==== Enhanced CD of the Year ====
- Family Time Favorites; Loving Care Children; Allan Hardin, Frank DeFino, Jr., Tom Defino
- Hide 'Em In Your Heart – Praise and Worship For Kids; Steve Green; Craig A. Mason; Sparrow Records
- Mission 3:16 Super CD 5; Carman; Gawain Reifsnyder; Sparrow Records
- **Steady On Enhanced CD**; Point of Grace; Denise Niebisch, Rose Irelan; Word Records
- Ten; The Birthday Album; Various; Damon Riley, Michael Wilson; ForeFront Records

==== Recorded Music Packaging of the Year ====
- Anybody Out There?; Burlap To Cashmere; Beth Lee; Michael Wilson; Squint Entertainment
- Bon Voyage; Bon Voyage; Suzy Hutchinson; J. Gnewikow; Tim Owen; BEC Recordings
- Down Goes The Day; Chris Taylor; Paul Soupiset; Paul Soupiset, Paul Soupiset; Toolbox; Thunder Image; Alan Clark
- Live The Life; Michael W. Smith; Diana Lussenden; Diana Lussenden; Jimmy Abegg; Reunion Records
- Supernatural; dcTalk; Deborah Norcross; Deborah Norcross; Alistair Thain, Len Paltier; ForeFront Records
- **The Jesus Record**; Rich Mullins and A Raggamuffin Band; Beth Lee, Jimmy Abegg, Ben Pearson; Beth Lee, Ben Pearson; Myrrh Records

==== Short Form Music Video of the Year ====
- "**Entertaining Angels**"; Newsboys; Janet Eisner; Eden; A&R; StarSong, Virgin
- "He Has Made Me Glad"; The Insyderz; Jonathan Richter; Squint Entertainment; Squint Entertainment
- "Kiss Me"; Sixpence None the Richer; Tiffany Long; Steve Taylor; Pearson/Taylor Productions; Squint Entertainment
- "Ms. Innocence"; Wilshire; Brandon Dickerson; Brandon Dickerson; Spiral Films; Rocketown Records
- "My Friend (So Long)"; dcTalk; C.J. Hicks; Tryan George; The End; ForeFront/Virgin
- "The Devil Is Bad"; The W's; Brandon Dickerson; Brandon Dickerson; Spiral Films; 5 Minute Walk, Sarabellum

==== Long Form Music Video of the Year ====
- Atlanta Homecoming; Bill Gaither & The Homecoming Friends; Bill Gaither, Barry Jennings, Bill Carter, Dennis Glore; Ralph Emery Productions; Spring House
- Mission 3:16 The Video; Carman; Stephen Yake, Cindy Montano; Stephen Yake; Stephen Yake Productions; Sparrow Records
- **My Utmost For His Highest – The Concert**; Cindy Morgan, Avalon, Twila Paris, Bryan Duncan, Sandi Patty, Steven Curtis Chapman; Nancy Knox; Clark Santee; Word Entertainment; Myrrh Records
- Perennial In Concert A Season of Worship; Twila Paris; Norman Miller; Russell Hall; Trinity Broadcasting Network; Sparrow Records
- X: The Birthday Video; Seven Day Jesus, Rebecca St. James, Bleach, Eli, Geoff Moore & The Distance, Considering Lily, Raze, The Normals, Grammatrain, Outro, Audio Adrenaline, dcTalk, Eddie DeGarmo, Michael Anderson, Dana Key, iona; Gael Van Sant, Cindy Montano, Darlene Brock; Cory Edwards; Blue Yonder Films, Forefront Records; ForeFront Records
