= List of awards and nominations received by Della Reese =

Della Reese awards and nominations
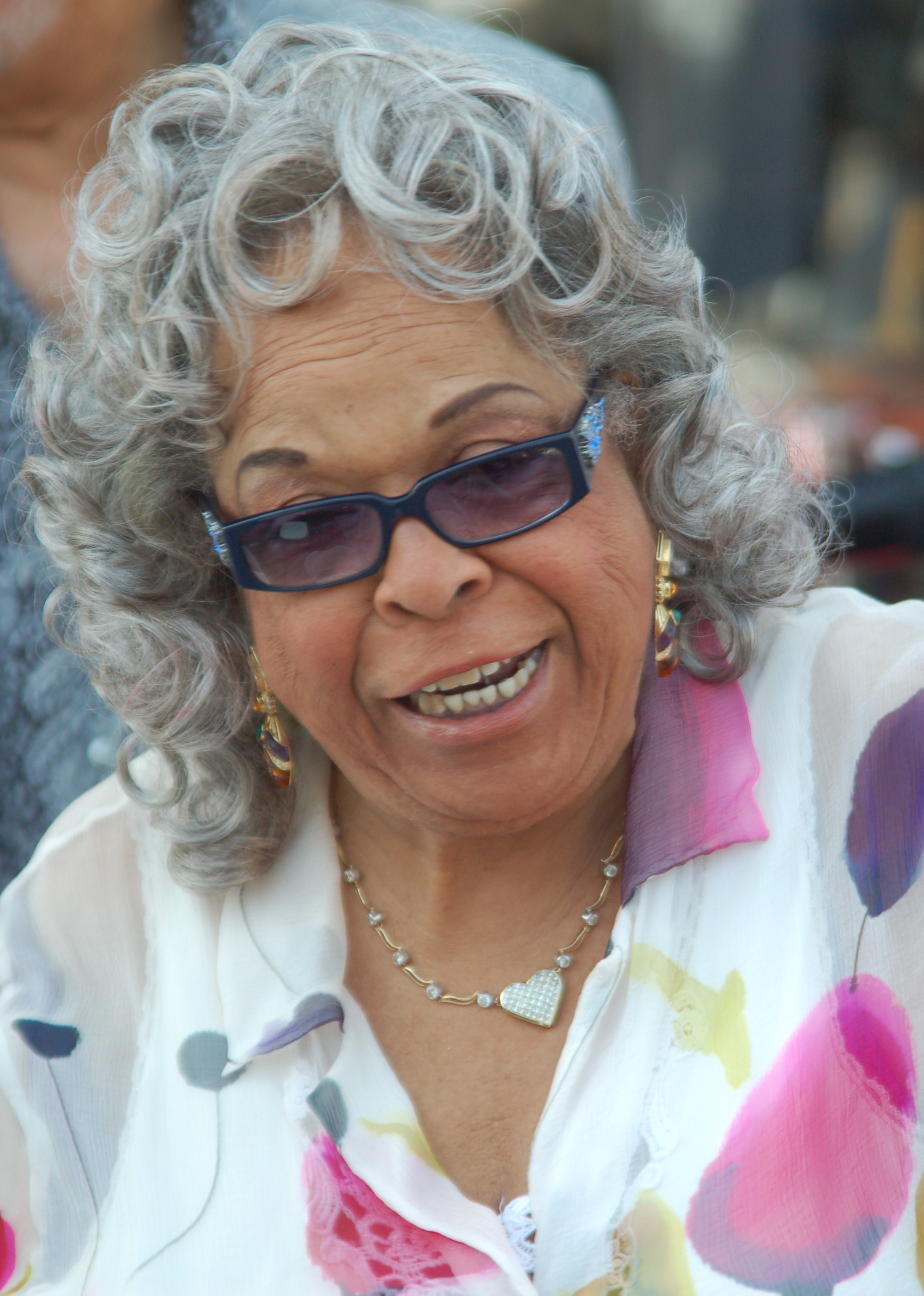
- Reese at the Hollywood Walk of Fame
Awards and nominations
Award	Wins	Nominations
Emmy Awards	0	2
Golden Globe Awards	0	1
Grammy Awards	0	3

Della Reese, an American singer, actress, television personality and author, has received several awards and nominations in her career.

== Awards and nominations ==
=== GMA Dove Awards ===
Year	Award	Nominated work	Result	Ref.
1999	Traditional Gospel Album of the Year	Live! My Soul Feels Better Right Now	Nominated	
1999	Special Event Album of the Year	Touched By An Angel: The Album	Nominated	

=== Golden Globe Awards ===
Year	Award	Nominated work	Result	Ref.
1997	Best Supporting Actress – Series, Miniseries or Television Film	Touched by an Angel	Nominated	

=== Grammy Awards ===
Year	Award	Nominated work	Result	Ref.
1961	Best Vocal Performance Album, Female	Della	Nominated	
1988	Best Soul Gospel Performance, Female	"You Gave Me Love"	Nominated	
1999	Best Traditional Gospel Album	Live! My Soul Feels Better Right Now	Nominated	

=== NAACP Image Awards ===
Year	Award	Nominated work	Result	Ref.
1994	Outstanding Actress in a Drama Series	Picket Fences	Nominated	
1996	Outstanding Actress in a Drama Series	Touched by an Angel	Won	
1997	Outstanding Actress in a Drama Series	Touched by an Angel	Won	
1998	Outstanding Actress in a Drama Series	Touched by an Angel	Won	
1999	Outstanding Actress in a Drama Series	Touched by an Angel	Won	
2000	Outstanding Actress in a Drama Series	Touched by an Angel	Won	
2001	Outstanding Actress in a Drama Series	Touched by an Angel	Won	
2002	Outstanding Actress in a Drama Series	Touched by an Angel	Won	

=== Primetime Emmy Awards ===
Year	Award	Nominated work	Result	Ref.
1997	Primetime Emmy Award for Outstanding Supporting Actress in a Drama Series	Touched by an Angel	Nominated	
1998	Primetime Emmy Award for Outstanding Supporting Actress in a Drama Series	Touched by an Angel	Nominated	

=== Screen Actors Guild Awards ===
Year	Award	Nominated work	Result	Ref.
1997	Outstanding Performance by a Female Actor in a Drama Series	Touched by an Angel	Nominated	
1998	Outstanding Performance by a Female Actor in a Drama Series	Touched by an Angel	Nominated	

=== Miscellaneous awards and honors ===
Year	Award Show	Award	Nominated work	Result	Ref.
1994	Hollywood Walk of Fame	7060 Hollywood Boulevard	Herself - Television	Awarded	
2000	Annie Awards	Outstanding Individual Achievement for Voice Acting By a Female Performer in an Animated Feature	Dinosaur	Nominated	
2015	Palm Springs Walk of Stars	Golden Palm Star	Herself	Awarded	
2017	Rhythm & Blues Music Hall of Fame	Herself	N/A	Inducted	
