= Schaer =

Schaer, Schär, or Schar is a surname. Notable people with the surname include:

- Fabian Schär (born 1991), Swiss footballer
- Jean-Marc Schaer (born 1953), French retired professional football striker
- Michael Schär (born 1986), Swiss professional road bicycle racer
- Manuela Schär (born 1984), Swiss Paralympic athlete
- Gary Schaer (born 1951), American Democratic Party politician
- Dwight Schar (born 1942), an American businessman, philanthropist, and Republican Party financial supporter
- Fritz Schär (1926–1997), Swiss cyclist
- Andrew Schär (born 1981), South African-born composer, actor, and musician
- Miriam Schaer (born 1956), American artist
- Robin Beth Schaer, American poet
