= Gina Carey =

American singer

- Also known as: Gina Green, Gina Brown
- Origin: Chicago, U.S.
- Genres: Gospel, R&B, neo souls
- Occupations: Singer, filmmaker
- Years active: 1996–present
- Labels: Gico Music, Trendency, Rite-Step Records, Isom & Isom, Grapetree
- Website: GinaCarey.net, GinaCareyFilms.com

Gina Carey is an American independent filmmaker and soul R&B / gospel music singer based in Palm Springs, California. Formerly known as Gina Green, Gina has since remarried and changed her name to Gina Carey.

== Early life ==
Gina was born in Chicago and raised in Los Angeles. Gina Carey has a younger sister Bella Maori who is an actress and screenwriter. Bella Maori is the creator of the award winning tv show “Ugly”. Gina grew up with her sister in Los Angeles.

== Career ==
=== Acting ===
Gina Carey is currently a filmmaker who manages her own independent film company, Gina Carey Films. The indie film company, which has successfully produced six feature films as of 2019, is based in the Coachella Valley and makes use of local talent and resources. As the first African-American female filmmaker in Palm Springs, Gina had originally started out as a self-taught, self-funded filmmaker who eventually expanded onto building Gina Carey Films.

Gina Carey Films' first movie, “The Unexpected”, premiered in 2016. Subsequently, Gina Carey Films has produced other indie films such as “One Year Pact.”

In 2017, Gina launched the 1st annual CV (Coachella Valley) Indie Film Awards, which was awarded to independent filmmakers producing low-budget films. The 2nd annual CV Indie Film Awards were continued in 2018.

=== Music ===
Gina has produced 14 CD albums (3 gospel and 11 soul CDs), as well as 5 hit singles that have reached number one on the UK charts.

Gina's debut album, In His Time, was released on Grapetree Records in 1997 under her then-legal name, Gina Brown, and sold over 10,000 copies worldwide. The album was received particularly well in Europe, topping out at number two on the U.K. Gospel charts. 2003's Changes was released independently and sold at a respectable pace. The planned release for Tell 'Um, her third album on Rite-Step Records, fell through in mid-2005 as the label folded before it even got off the ground. The album was later picked up by Nashville-based Trendency Records and released nationally in July 2006. The singles "Hiding Place" and "Testimony" received moderate airplay across the U.S. and in Europe. Both the Changes and Tell 'Um albums were produced by Isom Green, Jr., who has worked with Dr. Dre, Whitney Houston, Ice Cube, and Snoop Dogg.

Gina has recorded three albums as Gina Green, which are In His Time, Changes, and Tell 'Um. She is known for her vibrant spirit and silky-smooth vocal style, and is often compared stylistically to 1980s pop diva Stephanie Mills. Her music blends elements of contemporary R&B with 1970s soul and modern-day hip hop to create a neo soul gospel flavor.

Gina has performed on the same stage with Gospel artists Tonex, J Moss, TBN's Bill & Rene Morris, The Gospel Gangsters, two-time Dove Award nominees God's Original Gangstaz, Brent Jones, and many others.

Gina Carey is the founder and CEO of Gico Music, an independent music label and entertainment company.

== Awards ==
In 2006, Gina was nominated by the Black Music Academy Association of America in two categories: "Best Gospel Performer - Female" and "Gospel Rising Star". She performed at the event, held at the Cashman Theater, before a full house and won the "Las Vegas Black Music Awards 2006 Best Gospel Performer - Female" award. Later that year, she auditioned for NBC's America's Got Talent. In 2008 Gina also auditioned for Showtime at the Apollo in Los Angeles, California, and was chosen to be on the show.

Gina has won various music awards, including:

- Best Gospel Artist (2006)
- Rising Stars of the Desert “Best Jazz Music Artist Award” (2012)
- Best Single, GHP Virtual Music Awards (song: “Beautiful Music”) (2015)
- “Best Contemporary Artist”, Coachella Valley Music Award (2015, 2016, 2017)
- Most Influential and Interesting Women in the Coachella Valley, from Coachella Valley Weekly (2016)

Gina's film awards include:

- The One Year Pact: Cinemafest award winner (October 2, 2017)
- The Assumptions: Miami Epic Trailer Festival award winner (April 21, 2017)
- The Unexpected: Nevada International Film Festival award winner (November 15, 2016)

In addition to being an award recipient, Gina is also the founder and manager of the CV Indie Film Awards.

== Filmography ==
Gina Carey is the director and producer for the following independent films.

- Acts of Kindness
- Rose England
- The One Year Pact (2018)
- The Assumptions (2017)
- Aspire to Inspire (2016)
- The Unexpected (2016)

== Discography ==
=== Albums ===
Album	Year
In His Time	1996
Changes	2003
Tell 'Um	2006
My Journey	2008
Melodic	2011
Love Letters	2012
Love Letters 2 (the Love Continues)	2012
Funk Rhythm & Soul	2013
The Songbird	2013
Can You Dig It	2015

== See also ==
- Black women filmmakers
