= Hefe Wine =

American rapper

- Also known as: Wine-O; Black Jew; NuWine
- Born: Maurice Williams; Houston, Texas, United States
- Genres: Hip Hop, R&B, Screwed & Chopped
- Labels: Wine-O Records; Grapetree Records

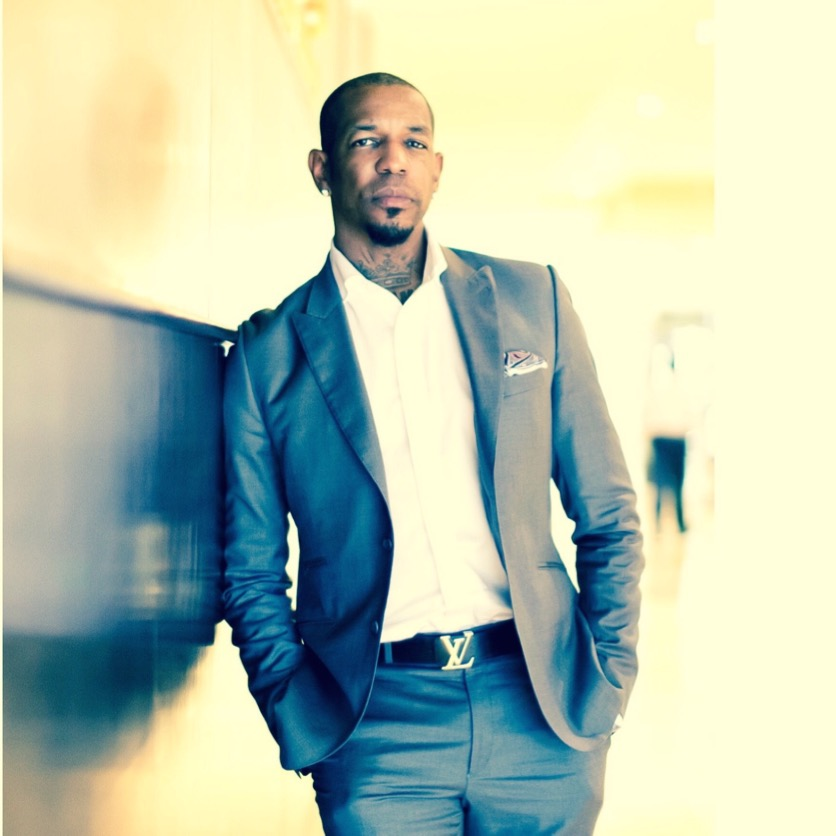
Hefe Wine

Maurice Williams (born August 25, 1972), known by his stage names Hefe Wine, NuWine, and Wine-O, is an American rapper and producer from Houston, Texas. In 2006, his single "Pop My Trunk" appeared on the Billboard Top 100.

In 2014, he received media attention following claims of a sex tape featuring Williams and his former girlfriend Iggy Azalea.

== Early life ==
Maurice Williams was raised in Houston. At the age of 15, after a troubled childhood in a dysfunctional family with an alcoholic father, he started stealing cars.

== Music career ==
In 1996, he released his debut album, Bloody 5th. He has since released 17 albums, and secured record label deals with EMI and Universal Records.

Beyoncé featured his track "Pop My Trunk" on her 2016 Formation tour.
