= Antonio Neal =

- Birth name: Antonio Neal Phelon
- Also known as: Amani
- Born: June 7, 1973 (age 51); Alton, Illinois
- Origin: Memphis, Tennessee
- Genres: Gospel; Christian R&B; Christian hip hop; urban gospel; black gospel
- Occupation(s): Singer, songwriter
- Instrument(s): Vocals, singer-songwriter
- Years active: 1999–present
- Labels: EMI Gospel, Grapetree
- Website: antonioneal.net

Antonio Neal Phelon (born June 7, 1973) is an American gospel musician and music producer, as well as a Christian R&B, Christian hip hop, urban gospel and black gospel recording artist and singer. He started his music career, in 1999, with an independently-made album on Grapetree Records under the name Amani, followed by a second album on label. His first studio album, Days of My Life, that was released by EMI Gospel. His only hip hop music album, Bible Megamix, was released Anshar Forever Records, in 2009. The only extended play, Welcome Home, a contemporary R&B work, was released by Madison Line, in 2014. He has won two GMA Dove Awards, one for his songwriting and another for his music production work.

== Early life ==
Antonio Neal Phelon, was born on June 7, 1973, in Alton, Illinois, into a family of seven children, where his father was a construction worker on extended duration projects that kept him away from home, but for two weekends a month. His mother was an integral force in fostering his faith development, where she was a devoted church attendee, while his brother brought about his love of gospel music with listening to artists Andraé Crouch and Commissioned. He went to Texas A&M University on a full basketball scholarship during his first year, while he would marry, Sharralisa, at just 19 years-old, eventually moving back home to Illinois. Phelon would play his remaining three years of basketball eligibility, with three different programs, all the while getting full scholarships.

== Music career ==
Phelon's music recording career began in 1999, with an independently-made album, Issues of Life, under the name Amani, on Grapetree Records followed by a second album on Grapetree, Songs of Love. His first studio album, Days of My Life, was released on August 2, 2005, with EMI Gospel. The only hip hop music album, Bible Megamix, was released in 2009, from Anshar Forever Records. He released, an extended play, Welcome Home, in 2014, with Madison Line Records. He has won two GMA Dove Awards, the first in 2007 for his production work on It's Not Over by Karen Clark Sheard, and songwriting in 42nd GMA Dove Awards for "There Is Nothing Greater Than Grace" by Point of Grace.

== Personal life ==
He currently resides in Memphis, Tennessee, with his wife Shae, and their three children.

== Discography ==
- Issues of Life (1999, Grapetree Records)
- Songs of Love (2001, Grapetree Records)
- Days of My Life (August 2, 2005, EMI Gospel)
- Bible Megamix (2009, Anshar Forever)
- Welcome Home EP (2014, Madison Lane)
