= William Secondo Lombardo =

William Secondo Lombardo (1930 – 27 March 2009) is a Canadian businessman and entrepreneur and philanthropist. Lombardo was born in Windsor, Ontario. His father Angelo owned Lombardo Construction, which in the 1960s built many Windsor-area establishments, including ice rinks and schools. Bill and his wife Jina moved to southern Spain in the mid-1970s, with their six boys. They settled in Torremolinos, a picturesque coastal town, and ran a restaurant and bar. The family returned to Windsor in the early 1980s, and Bill took over as President and CEO of Peerless-Cascade Plastics. He turned that fledgling company into a major auto parts supplier in southern Ontario and Kentucky. Also, he represented the Canadian government on trade missions to China and Japan. Throughout his life, Lombardo contributed generously to charities and other worthy causes, such as building the Brentwood Recovery Home in Windsor. Bill was an active community member in Palm Springs, California, where Jina and he kept a winter home. Over the past few decades, the couple's worldwide travels took them to faraway places in Africa, Alaska, Asia, Europe, and Hawaii.

Bill Lombardo was a pioneer in establishing better employer–employee relations in the Windsor area, and was among the first business owners to set up an employee substance abuse treatment program.
