= The Perry Sisters =

- Origin: Huntington, WV, United States
- Genres: Southern Gospel
- Years active: 1974–present
- Labels: Chapel Valley
- Website: www.perrysisters.com

The Perry Sisters originated in Huntington, WV in 1974 with Diana Perry Gillette and her two sisters, Bonnie & Carol.

In 1984 they signed with a major record label and officially became the first professional ladies trio in southern gospel music and have enjoyed numerous top charting songs over their 43 year career including I Wonder How Mary Felt, There'll Be A Payday, Resurrection Morn, Imagine If You Will, Heaven's Avenue, Only Sleeping, More Like You, That Wonderful Name, God Save Our Country, and He'll Deliver Me.

The Perry Sisters have recorded 25 albums, and had 33 top forty hits, in a career spanning 43 years.

The Perry Sisters have been nominated for numerous awards such as: Favorite Trio, Favorite Soprano, Horizon Award, and Favorite Video and in 2009 and 2010 was awarded Favorite Female Group at the SGN Music Awards, .

In 1990 Diana's sisters retired from the road, leaving Diana as the remaining founding member.

The group reorganized with Diana Perry Gillette in the lead position.

Diana is known for her distinctive voice in contemporary gospel music and her work as a songwriter in the southern gospel music field.

Tammy Underwood, Diana's niece, holds the soprano position and plays acoustic guitar. Tammy has a signature sound with dynamic tones and range and has also contributed to the Perry Sisters songwriting efforts.

Diana's daughter, Nicole Mathews makes her debut with her rich alto voices on the new recording' "a New Season," proving nothing sounds better than family.
