= Palm Springs Walk of the Stars =

Sidewalk stars honoring Palm Springs area personalities

Palm Springs Walk of Stars
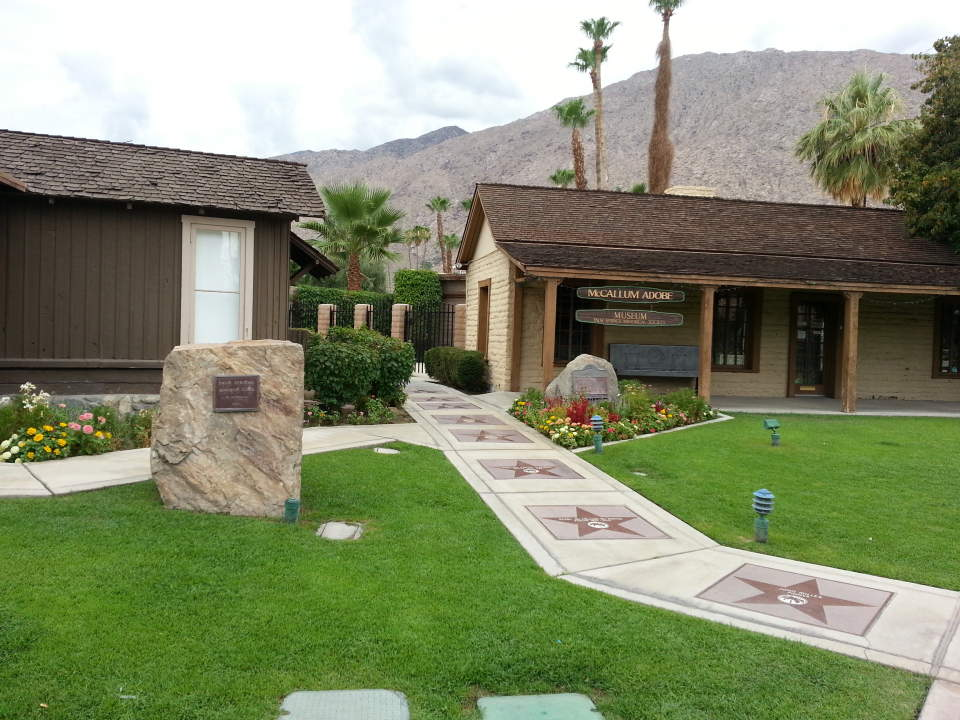
- Stars on the Palm Springs Walk of Stars near the Cornelia White House

- Location in Palm Springs, California
- Established: February 26, 1992
- Location: Palm Springs, California, U.S.
- Coordinates: 33°49′23″N 116°32′49″W
- Type: Hall of Fame
- Founders: Gerhard Frenzel; Barbara Foster-Henderson
- Website: walkofthestars.com

The Palm Springs Walk of the Stars is a Walk of the Stars in downtown Palm Springs, California. Embedded in the sidewalks, the Golden Palm Stars honor notable individuals who have lived in the greater Palm Springs region, across multiple categories. The walk spans sections streets on downtown Palm Springs.

It was established in 1992 by Gerhard G. Frenzel and Barbara Foster-Henderson, with the inaugural ceremony held on February 26, 1992 and included Walk of the Stars chairman Johnny Grant. Modeled after the Hollywood Walk of Fame, the program has since honored presidents of the United States, showbusiness personalities, literary figures (authors, playwrights, screenwriters), pioneers and civic leaders (early settlers, tribal leaders, civic personalities), humanitarians and Medal of Honor recipients. As of 2025 nearly 480 stars have been dedicated.

== History ==
Plans for a Palm Springs Walk of the Stars began in the early 1990s, led by Frenzel and Foster-Henderson in collaboration with the Palm Springs Chamber of Commerce and the City of Palm Springs. The first five Golden Palm Stars were unveiled during the February 26, 1992 ceremony. Early inductees included local figures like theater proprietor Earle C. Strebe and individuals prominent during the Hollywood Golden Age. By 1999, 139 stars had been installed, and by 2006 the total reached around 300.

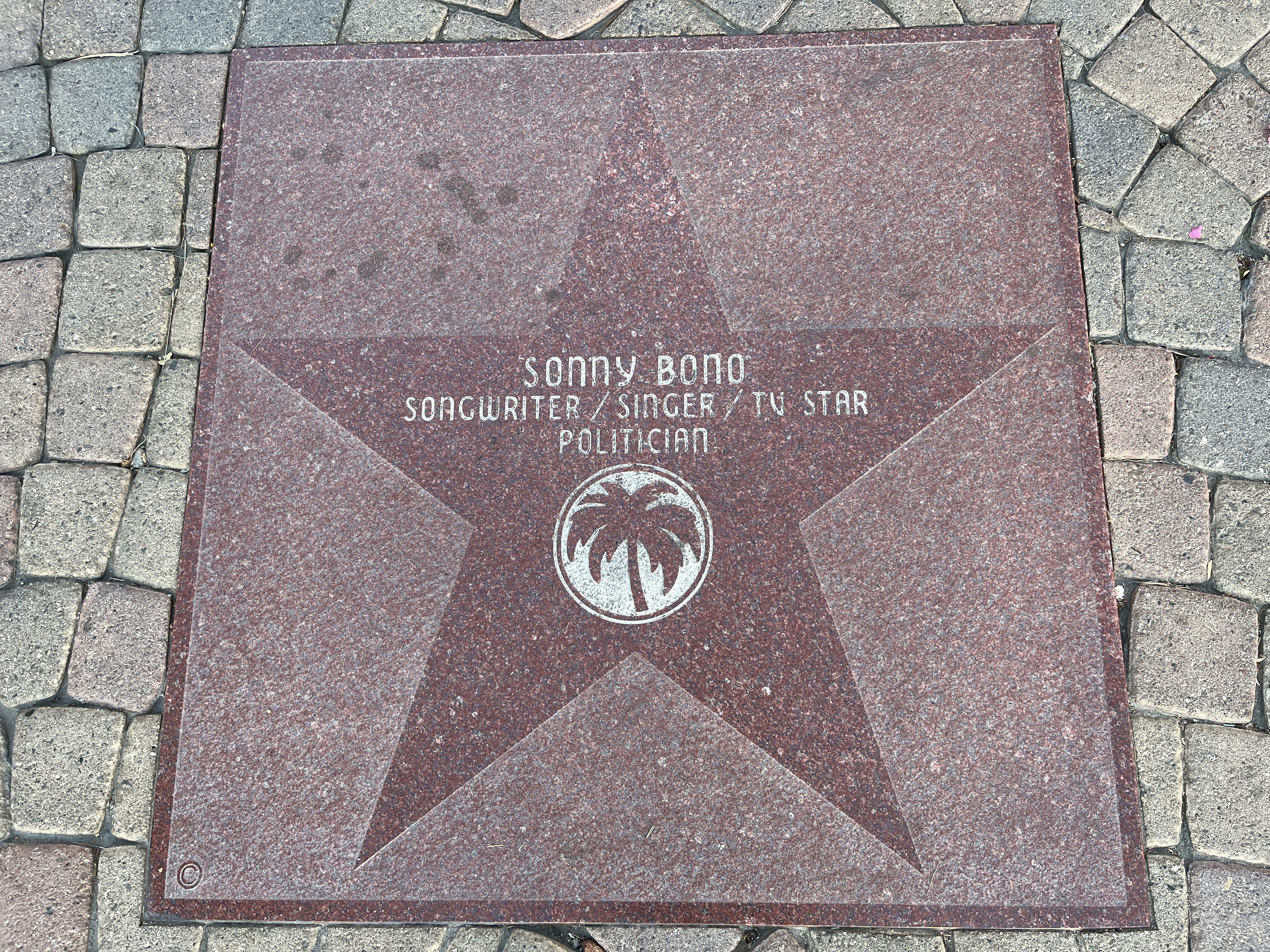
Star of Sonny Bono

During the 1990s and 2000s, honorees included entertainment professionals and local leaders such as Frank Sinatra, Sophia Loren, Elizabeth Taylor, Liberace, Dinah Shore, and Sonny Bono. The Walk also recognized historical figures, like the chimpanzee “Cheeta” of Tarzan fame received a star in 1995, and President Gerald Ford in 1997.

=== Controversy ===
In 2004, Gerhard Frenzel resigned from the Walk of the Stars Foundation over the nomination of golfer Ken Venturi.

In May 2017, installations were temporarily suspended while the Chamber and the City reviewed selection criteria amid concerns about the selection criteria. Later that year they resumed with stronger guidelines.

== Nomination and induction process ==
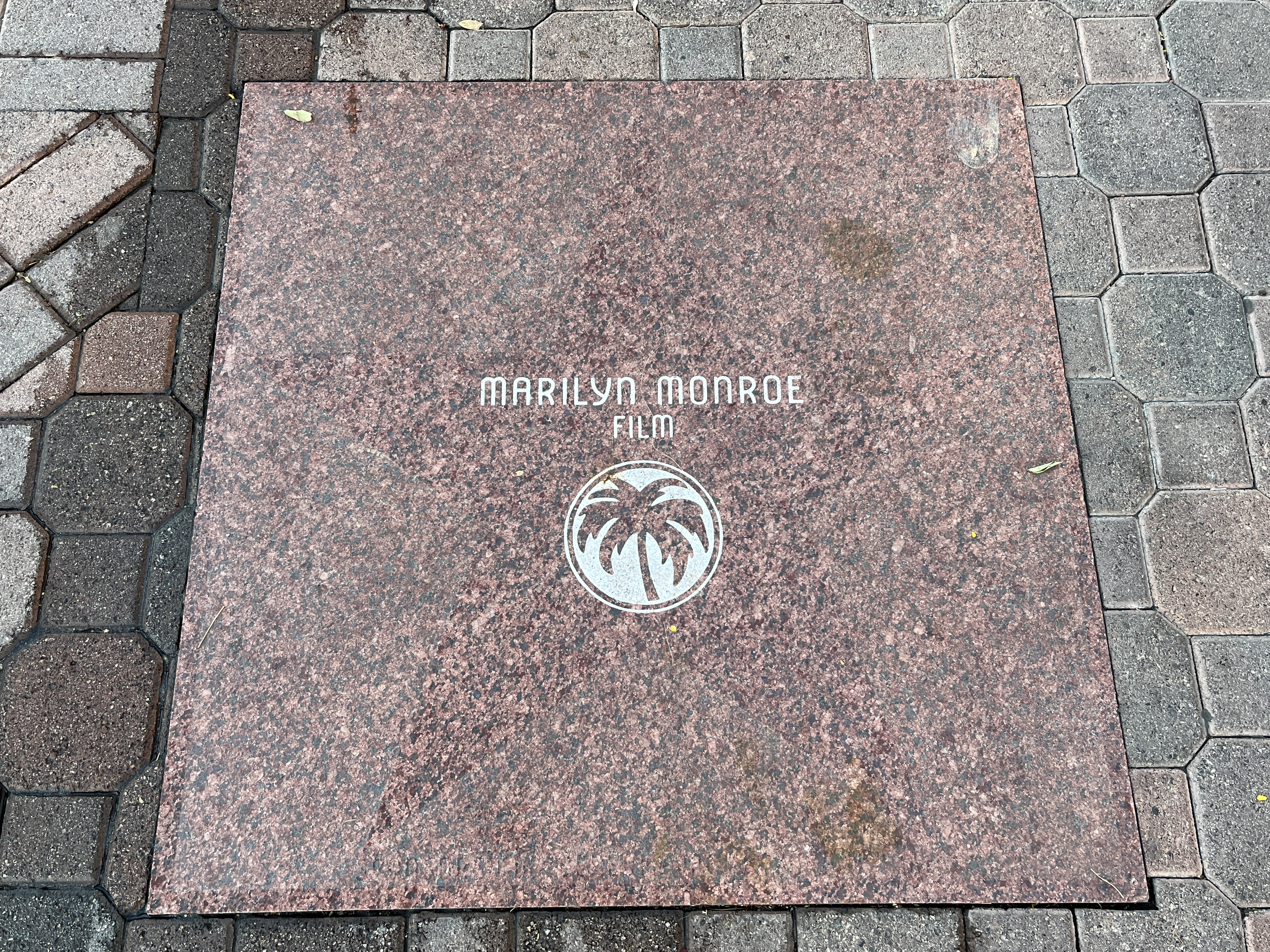
Star of Marilyn Monroe

The program is managed by the Palm Springs Chamber of Commerce in partnership with the City of Palm Springs. Anyone may submit a nomination, subject to the nominee's consent, for consideration by the Walk of Stars committee, which meets during the “season” (October–May). Typically 6–12 stars are approved and dedicated each season.

Nominees must have significant affiliation with the area and notable achievements in designated categories: Entertainment; Literary; Civic/Pioneer; Humanitarian; Architect/Artist/Designer; Athlete; and Military. Approved nominees (or their sponsors) must pay a sponsorship fee of US$15,000 as of 2023, covering the plaque, installation, ceremony, publicity, and an official city proclamation. Ceremonies are free public events held during the season, with honorees receiving a star replica and civic recognition. A mobile app and online map help visitors locate stars and learn about inductees.

== Categories ==
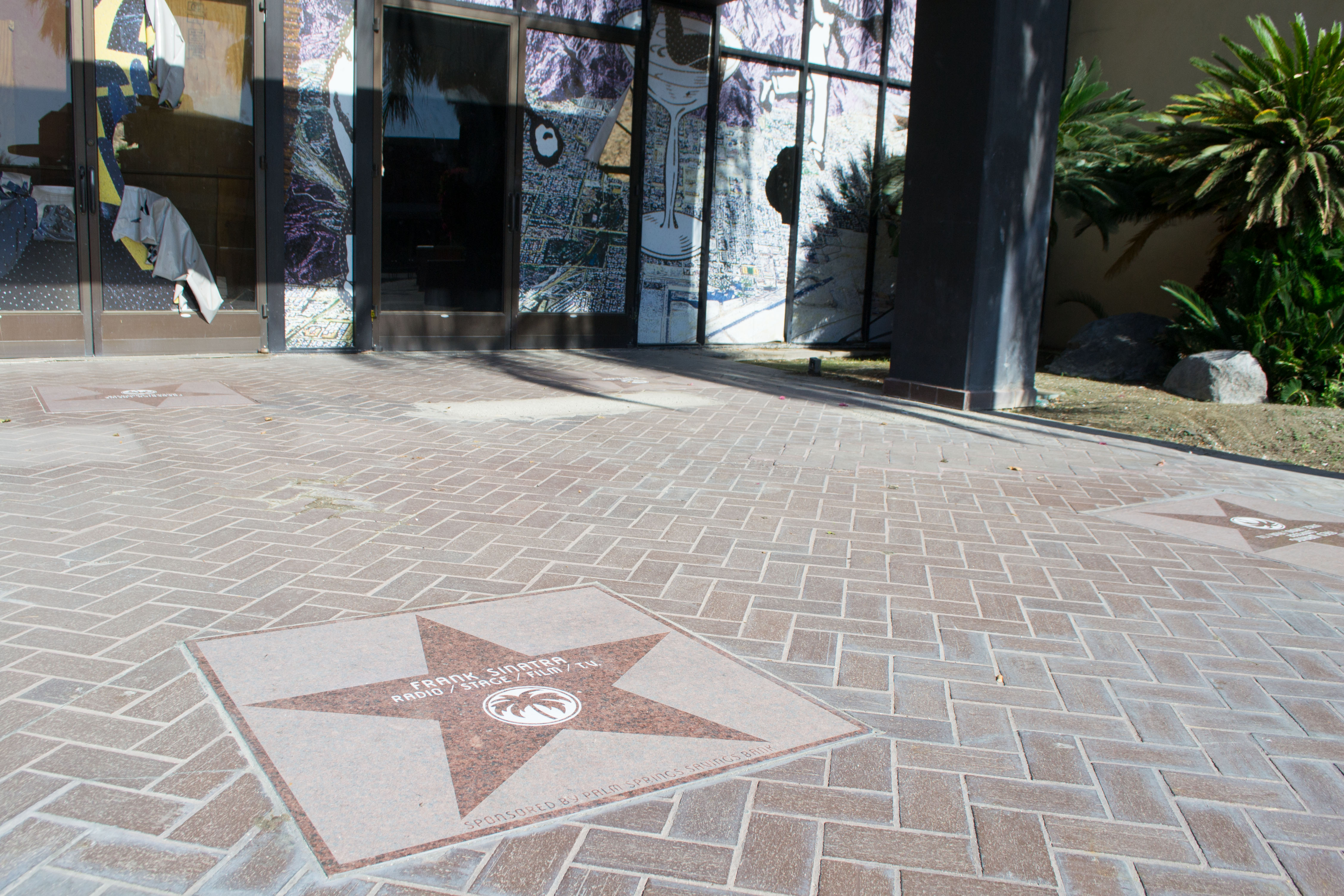
Star of Frank Sinatra

The Walk of the Stars honors individuals for their contributions in seven categories . The seven categories and their emblems are:

- Architect/Artist/Designer: Given to honorees who have achieved notability in the areas of architecture, art and design.
- Athlete: Given to individuals who have achieved a notable level of success in their sport.
- Civic/Pioneer: Awarded to individuals who have played a notable role in the development of Palm Springs.
- Entertainment: Honorees are people who have achieved notability in their respective fields.
- Humanitarianism: Given to honorees who have made a "notable contributions to their community, state, and country through philanthropic endeavors and selfless acts of kindness." (as quoted from the Walks' website)
- Literary: Given to honorees who have achieved notability in writing.
- Military: Given to honorees to people who have achieved a "illustrious military career" (as quoted from the Walks' website) and who have reached the rank of Flag or General in one of the US Armed Services.

The categories are not represented equally. To date, 68% of all honorees were awarded in the Entertainment category, 13% in Civic/Pioneer category, 8% in the Humanitarian category, 5% in the Architect/Artist/Designer category, 3% in the Literary category and less than 2% in the Athlete and Military categories.

Star locations

The majority of the Walk's stars are located on Palm Canyon Drive, running from the 1300 block of North Palm Canyon Drive (Ron Nyswaner) in the north, to the 400 block of South Palm Canyon Drive (President Dwight Eisenhower) in the south. Additionally, stars are located along Tahquitz Canyon Way, Museum Drive, Downtown Palm Springs Park and La Plaza Court, with one star located at 161 Waterford Circle (Ken Venturi) and one located at 100 E Arenas Rd (Paul Reed Yinger).

== Honorees ==
=== Inaugural Honorees ===
The first five inductees were:

- Earle C. Strebe, Owner of the Plaza Theatre
- William Powell, Actor
- Ruby Keeler, Actress, dancer, and singer
- Charles Farrell, Actor and politician
- Ralph Bellamy, Actor

=== Special Medal of Honor recipients ===
Five Medal of Honor recipients from the Coachella Valley were honored during the 1999 Veterans Day holiday.

- HM1 Robert E. Bush, US Navy
- Maj. Gen. James Lewis Day, US Marine Corps
- Capt. William McGonagle, US Navy, awarded for heroism during the 1967 USS Liberty incident
- Col. Lewis Millett, US Army
- Col. Mitchell Paige, US Marine Corps

=== Former presidents ===
Three former presidents of the United States lived in the Palm Springs area after their retirement.

- Dwight Eisenhower
- Gerald Ford
- Ronald Reagan

== See also ==
- List of people from Palm Springs, California
- List of walks of fame
- List of mayors of Palm Springs, California
