= Glenn M. Wagner =

American pastor

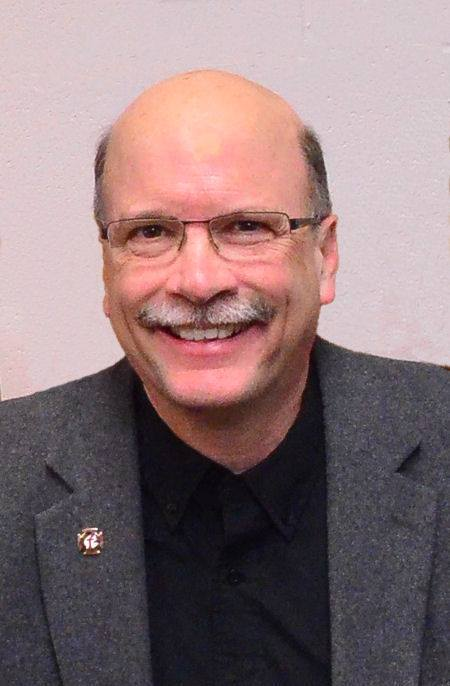

Glenn M. Wagner (born 1953) is an American United Methodist pastor and author. Throughout his 40-year pastoral career, Wagner served congregations in four states and two countries, most notably in Freeport and Harvard, Illinois and North Muskegon, Holt, and Grand Haven, Michigan. Wagner announced his retirement from the United Methodist Church of the Dunes in Grand Haven in October 2016.

== Education ==
Rev. Dr. Glenn M. Wagner was born in Elmhurst, Illinois, but moved to Michigan in 1971 to attend Hope College in Holland, Michigan. He graduated with a B.A. with honors from Hope College in 1975. The year before he graduated from Hope College, he attended the American University of Beirut and the Near East School of Theology. While there, he was the starting forward for the 1973 Lebanese National Championship basketball team for the university. He went on to receive the Mersick preaching prize in 1976 and earned his Master of Divinity degree from Yale Divinity School in 1978. Wagner completed his Doctor of Ministry degree in 1986 from Garrett-Evangelical Theological Seminary in Evanston, Illinois following an associate pastorship in Freeport. In 2000 and 2009, Wagner traveled to Jerusalem to further his education in the history and geography of the Bible.

Wagner married his wife Nancy (Oosting) on August 30, 1975, in Fremont, Michigan.

== Career ==
After graduating from Hope College, Wagner taught English and Biblical texts in Kaohsiung, Taiwan. While he was working on his masters of divinity degree at Yale Divinity School, Wagner interned as a chaplain in a drug and alcohol unit and hospital in Connecticut and later at Pine Rest Hospital in Grand Rapids.

Wagner began his work in ministry as an associate pastor in Freeport, Illinois while studying to complete his Doctor of Ministry degree at Garrett-Evangelical Theological Seminary in Evanston, Illinois. His degree focused on developing leadership for small groups in the church. Following graduation, Wagner became the pastor of 800-member First United Methodist Church in Harvard, Illinois from 1986 through 1992.

In 1992, Wagner moved back to Michigan to lead the congregation of Community United Methodist Church in North Muskegon. While in North Muskegon, Wagner graduated from the Muskegon Area Leadership Academy and acted as the vice president for several health project initiatives including the Community Mental Health board for Muskegon County and of Hospice of Muskegon-Oceana. Wagner also served as vice chair of the North Muskegon Charter Commission that wrote a new city charter. He authored the charter's preamble. The charter was adopted by an 80% majority. Alongside this work, Wagner acted as the chairman of the West Shore Committee for Jewish Christian Dialogue.

While serving in North Muskegon, Wagner lead several community efforts, including the Community United Methodist Church Rocket Team, a student organization made up of students from Mona Shores, Reeths-Puffer and North Muskegon public schools that competed in the Michigan Rockets for Schools competition. Under Wagner's leadership, the team took home several awards, including a championship trophy and individual awards for tabletop display, website design, and actual flight.

In 2006, Wagner was appointed pastor at Holt United Methodist Church in Holt, Michigan as the 45th pastor in the church's 161-year history. During his eight years of pastoral leadership in Holt, the congregation retired its debt, created more accessible and energy efficient buildings, expanded mission outreach to the community and became involved in Christian leadership training. He was named "People’s Choice" pastor for Holt by the Lansing State Journal three times in eight years and provided leadership for the Lansing District Board of Church Building and Location.

Wagner returned to Garrett-Evangelical Theological Seminary in 2010 to become a certified clergy coach through the school and the Samaritan Counseling Center.

Following his service in Holt, Wagner succeeded Rev. Daniel Duncan as the pastor of United Methodist Church of the Dunes in Grand Haven, Michigan in July 2014. Wagner announced that he would be retiring as pastor at the end of 2016 in October.

In August 2015, Wagner was selected as one of two co-chairs of the United Methodist Michigan Conference Design Team by Bishop Deborah Lieder Kiesey. The decision was made following an affirmative vote to combine the West Michigan and Detroit Annual Conferences. The Design Team, made up of 26 members from around the state of Michigan, have worked to design an annual Methodist conference for the over 800 United Methodist congregations in Michigan.

As a result of Wagner and Kiesey's collaboration, 2016 saw the beginning of the two areas holding a joint conference in Acme, Michigan at the Grand Traverse Resort & Spa. In 2019, the Detroit and West Michigan Conferences will combine to form the Michigan Conference.

In 2016, Wagner released his first book, entitled God-Incidents: Real-Life Stories to Strengthen and Restore Your Faith.

== Written works ==
- God-Incidents: Real-Life Stories to Strengthen and Restore Your Faith (2016)
