= Grapetree Records =

US record label

- Founded: 1993
- Founder: Knolly Williams
- Defunct: 2003
- Distributor: Diamante Music Group
- Country of origin: United States
- Location: Austin, Texas

Grapetree Records is a record label founded by Knolly Williams. It was active from the early 1990s to the early 2000s.

== History ==
=== Beginning ===
In 1988, Knolly Williams was anxious enough to avoid the temptations inside Los Angeles to spend a summer in Austin, Texas working for his uncle. Although he had given up his dreams of rap stardom as part of his commitment to Christianity, he allowed himself to write verses he deemed "poetry" but suspiciously resembled lyrics.

According to Williams, the path toward founding a Christian rap label followed God's giving him the name "Grapetree." Biblically speaking, Williams says the name represents a combination of people that were about to be destroyed (grapes) and the fully restored state of man in Christ (trees).

After getting his GED, starting college, and working a series of Austin-area graphic design and retail management jobs, Williams decided to launch Grapetree in 1993 with his first release as Rubadub, Reflections of an Ex-Criminal. His second release, Mind of a Gangsta, wound up setting the tone for the upstart company.

By then, Williams had signed a distribution deal with Diamante Music Group, a mid-size distributor that handled retail accounts for more than 40 Christian indies. Three years later, Grapetree stood as the coalition's bestselling label, with each Grapetree release averaging 10,000-25,000 units. At that point, Grapetree was releasing as many as 30 albums a year. To Williams' surprise, finding the label's talent wasn't difficult. Grapetree artists routinely found other MCs disenfranchised by street life on the road and turned them on to Williams. By 1995, Williams brought his wife onboard full-time and quickly began amassing a staff.

In 1999, Grapetree signed a lucrative distribution deal with EMI, the parent company of Capitol Records.

Grapetree was featured on ABC, NBC, FOX, CBS, Newsweek and in over 300 newspapers worldwide. The company grew to become the largest independent label in Central Texas and the world leader for the genre, with over one million CD units sold. However, by 2001, the music industry had suffered a severe blow with the onset of digital downloading. And, like the high-tech industry, sales came to an almost stand-still. After 12 profitable years, the bottom fell out of the business when the music industry switched to "digital". The situation worsened quickly, and before long, Williams was facing default and possible foreclosure. Fortunately, he and his wife Josie had built enough equity in their home to be able to sell, without having to bring money to the table. The experience of nearly losing their home, however, left Williams reeling—and gave him a perspective that he would carry with him into a new career in real estate.

=== Reformation ===
In 2023, Knolly Williams announced the reformation of Grapetree Records, with Lil Raskull as the CEO and himself as the chairman. He also announced a new roster featuring Alicross, Colby J, and Zigg Madison. This reformation was done in partnership with Syntax Creative. “We are thrilled to partner with Grapetree Records and bring their genre-defining music into our system,” said Syntax Creative CEO Timothy Trudeau. “Grapetree started releasing music when I was still in high school and definitely paved the way for the rest of us. I’m excited to now return that same favor.”

=== Divisions ===
- GT Latin
- Phat Boy Music
- Diamond Cut Records
- Syntax Creative

== Artists ==
- A.G.E.
- Alicross
- Angela
- Antonious
- Amani aka Antonio Neal
- Ayeesha
- Barry G
- Breathe Eazy
- Bruthaz Grimm
- Christ Fa Real
- Colby J.
- C.R.O.W.
- D.D.C.
- D.C.P.
- E-Roc (aka Rhymes Monumental)
- Faze
- Fiti Futuristic
- Tha Original Flow
- FTF (Dr. Chedder & Fila Phil)
- Geno V
- God's Original Gangstaz
- J-ROC
- KIIS
- L.G. Wise
- Lil' Raskull
- Mike Mike
- Mr. Real
- M.V.P.
- Mystery
- NuWine (now known as Hefe Wine)
- Preachas in tha Hood
- Prime Minister
- Rhymes Monumental (aka E-Roc)
- Rubadub
- St8 Young Gangstaz
- Truth
- True II Society
- Zigg Madison

== Discography ==
1993

- Rubadub - Reflections of An Ex-Criminal

1995

- KIIS - West Coast Thang
- Barry G - Rugged Witeness

1996

- Rubadub - Mind Of A Gangster
- Gina Brown (now known as Gina Green) - In His Time
- D.D.C. - Plate Fulla Funk
- Lil' Raskull - Controversial All-Star
- G.O.G.'z - True 2 Tha Game
- Faze - Just Trying Ta Stay Up
- GOD's New Creation - Self Titled
- Muzik Ta Ride 2 Vol. 1
- HHH Vol. - Strickly Gangsta Style

1997

- Prime Minister - Prime Time
- True 2 Society - Bow Down
- Lil' Raskull - Cross Bearing
- Preachas in tha Hood - Gangstaz Pain
- G.O.G.'z - Resurrected Gangstaz
- Geno V - Take Me 2 Tha Homies
- L.G. Wise - G's Us 4 Life
- Nuwine - Da Bloody 5th
- Muzik Ta Ride 2 Vol. 2
- HHH Vol. 2 - From Tha Ground Up
- Gina Brown - In His Time
- Another Way to Praise - Take A Look Back

1998

- Prime Minister - Prime Time 2: The Millennium
- True 2 Society - Let's Take a Ride
- Lil' Raskull - Gory to Glory
- Preachas in tha Hood - Tearz Of A Gangsta
- E-Roc - The Return
- Rhymes Monumental aka E-Roc - Target Earth
- G.O.G'z - Pawn's In A Game of Chess
- SYG'z - Steady Bangin'
- Lord Byron - Keep Tha Fire Burning
- Antonious - Good Vs. Evil
- D.C.P. - The Last Saint
- Bruthaz Grimm - He's Coming
- L.G. Wise - Never Alone
- Muzik Ta Ride 2 Vol. 3
- GT Hit Mix: Wreakin' Thangs
- HHH Vol. 3 - Ghetto Drama
- Phat Trax R&B Vol. 1

1999

- E-Roc - Avalanche
- Lil' Raskull - Certified Southern Hits
- Preachas in tha Hood - Life Sentence
- G.O.G.'z - Tha G Files
- SYG'z - Tha Movement
- Ayeesha - Listen Closely
- Antonious - Principalities
- D.C.P. - Ghetto Preacha
- C.R.O.W. - Operation K.A.P. (Kill A Pimp)
- Bruthaz Grimm - Letter 2 Tha Bruthaz
- Muzik Ta Ride 2 Vol. 4
- Mr. Real - Humility
- HHH Vol. 4 - N-Tyme Mafia
- Christ Fa Real - It's Personal
- Amani - Issues Of Life
- Rhat Trax R&B Vol. 2
- GT Greatest Hits Vol. 1

2000

- Prime Minister - Inside Out
- True 2 Society - All Up In Yo Face
- Lil' Raskull - The Day After
- Rhymes Monumental aka E-roc - A Lie N Science
- D.C.P. - Our Time to Shine
- Bruthaz Grimm - ...And Things Will Never Be The Same
- F.T.F. - Fireproof?
- J-Roc - Last Days: Perelious Times
- L.G. Wise - Ghetto Fables: Da 1/2 Ain't Been Told
- Mr. Real - A Chosen One
- Muzik Ta Ride 2 Vol. 5
- GT Greatest Hits Vol. 2
- Kandle - Encounters
- Angela - Faithful & True

2001

- Amani - Songs Of Love
- Preachas in tha Hood - Gangsta Hitz
- Antonious - This Chapter In My Life
- C.R.O.W. - Method Of Attack
- L.G. Wise - Greatest Hits
- Marod - Degree 40:3
- Muzik Ta Ride 2 Vol. 6: 2001
- Southern Butter: Hot Out Tha Kitchen
- Testimony: Songs of Redemption
- King Cyz - Life Or Death
- Mystery - The Mystery Is Revealed

2002

- Prime Minister & Z.O.E. Click - Reel Life
- Rhymes Monumental aka E-Roc - Back 2 Earth
- Antonious - Fury (Greatest Hits)
- Fiti Futuristic - All In A Days Work
- Muzik Ta Ride 2 Vol. 7: From Tha Cross 2 Da Streets
- The Gathering: Chicago's Finest

2003

- Truth - The Truth Hurts
- E-Roc - Greatest Hits

2024

- Alicross - Alone
