= Monte Zucker =

American photographer (1929 - 2007)

Monte Zucker M.Photog.Cr., Hon.M.Photog., API, F-ASP (born on September 1, 1929, died March 15, 2007) was an American photographer. He specialized in wedding photography, entering it as a profession in 1947. In the 1970s he operated a studio in Silver Spring, Maryland. Later he lived in Florida.

He was Brides Magazine's Wedding Photographer of the Year for 1990 and United Nations Photographer of the Year for 2002, and one of Canon's "Explorers of Light". Additionally, he was a prolific author and teacher, with monthly columns in magazines such as Shutterbug. Several manufacturers made equipment bearing his name, including Westcott's "Monte Reflector" and ALM's "Monte Zucker Pneumatic Posing Stool".

Unlike many photographers of his generation, he embraced new technology, particularly digital photography and Adobe Photoshop. He featured digital techniques in his magazine columns until the end of his life, and related them to earlier methods. He did a series of traveling workshops taught by himself and Eddie Tapp, who covered Photoshop techniques.

== Quotations ==
He noted in one column that one of his maxims was "See the finished picture before you even snap the shutter!" He repeated this at each of his three training seminars in the United Kingdom in the late 1980s. Regarding digitally retouched images, he stated "Did I have this in mind when I first created the image? Yes and no. I wanted to create something artistic, something special. Did I know how I was going to do it? Not really."

"If you like the way it looks, go with it! I liked it and I did it! Of course, it takes a lot of experience to develop good taste. When one is just starting out it's easy to like something without knowing if it's really good or not. That works some of the time, but an educated opinion usually works better."

== Early career ==
Monte Zucker started doing photography in high school in Washington, D.C., shooting for friends who remained loyal clients over the years as they became successful and affluent professionals and businessmen. By the early 1970s he had specialized in wedding photography. At this time, he worked almost exclusively for affluent members of the Jewish community in the Washington, D.C. area, primarily shooting weddings and bar mitzvahs.

== Innovator ==
In the 1960s most formal portraits were taken with large cumbersome pack and head flash units, with wedding reception "candid" photos taken with a single flash on camera and dimensionally flat lighting.

What set Monte's work apart from his peers was the use of daylight from a north-facing window and a reflector for his formal posed portraits. He used backgrounds he had painted on 8-foot-wide (2.4 m) linen roll-up window shades to mimic the look of Old Master painters. He marketed this style as an "Old Master Style" which appealed to his niche market.

By the late 1960s color began to replace black and white for shooting weddings, and electronic flash guns replaced flash bulbs. A technical shortcoming of color film was that it could not reproduce the full range of detail in a photograph when a single flash on camera was used. Familiar with conventional studio lighting, Monte understood that the solution to the shorter range film was to control the range of the scene with two lights; one off camera light for modeling (key light), over a foundation of even centered light (fill) to control the tone of the shadows. With the invention of the photo-cell trigger, which allowed wireless firing of the off-camera "key" flash, Monte created studio-like lighting "on the fly" at wedding receptions using two identical direct flash units, one mounted over the camera as fill to control the shadow tone and a second optically triggered key light for 3D modeling which he mounted on a rolling converted medical IV stand.

The difference in the realism of the photos both in tonal range and 3D modeling that dual-flash candid shooting provided revolutionized wedding photography. This created a new career for Monte, who taught others how to duplicate his style.

His style was characterized by precise control of lighting pattern and facial angles in every "candid" reception shot. It gave them a three-dimensional quality and full tonal range that the work.

Monte was innovative in his approach to wedding photography. Rather than trying to photograph the live action of the ceremony under available light, he would make prior arrangements to recreate parts of the ceremony afterwards while the guests were en route to the reception. When combined with the other window and dual flash photos, the finished product had a polished look.

By using window light, Monte was able to set up and shoot anywhere during the day with minimum equipment. Not needing a "brick and mortar" studio allowed him to work out of his Silver Spring home with just a reception area and a room for meeting clients.

Monte later opened several studios and switched to using studio flash. He set up his studio with identical "key" and "hair" lights on both sides of the room, which allowed a subject to be faced either right or left without needing to move the lighting gear. Other photographers began to equip their studios similarly.

== Marketing strategy ==
Monte also took wedding photos of flower arrangements, the wedding cake, food buffets, and the band. He would send vendors free prints to show off his work. He matted and framed the prints to make it easy for the vendors to hang them up. Top-end wedding business in the Washington D.C. area had a "Monte Wall" with his name stamped in gold foil in the corner of every photo, which generated referrals.

== Second career as a teacher ==
In the 1960s, most wedding photographers were members of the Professional Photographers of America (PPofA), which regularly held print competitions at meetings and conventions. Monte won competitions at the state and national levels in the "Candid" category of the competitions, which gave him recognition beyond his niche market. Awards in competition led to offers to teach at PPofA events and training seminars, as well as writing a column on wedding photography in the PPofA magazine. He also attracted the support of sponsors such as Rolleiflex and Meisel Photo Labs.

Monte's teaching style kept the technical side of wedding photography simple. This allowed the photographer to focus their attention on client interaction.

He taught easy to learn "1-2-3" techniques for posing people, which allowed Mr. Zucker to teach complex topics such as lighting and posing. These techniques allowed for predictable photos for the client. Some criticized him for having a rigid, rule-based approach.

== Later years ==
Having a distinguishable style made it difficult to stray too far from it.

Monte retired from the wedding business and relocated to Florida in the 1990s where he experimented with digital photography.

He remained a teacher and speaker until his death. He shared his enthusiasm for the new digital capture and editing medium.

== Personal life ==
Zucker mentioned aspects of his personal life in his photography magazine columns, including his diagnosis of terminal cancer. Shortly after the diagnosis, he arranged a four-generation photo session that included himself, his children, grandchildren, and a great-grandchild. Photos from that session appeared in his Shutterbug column.

His marriage to Sondra Wool Zucker ended in divorce. Zucker recognized his homosexuality after his divorce.

Zucker died from pancreatic cancer at his home in Fort Lauderdale, Florida at the age of 77.
