= Jerry Moe =

American therapist

Jerry Moe is a therapist, author, trainer, and public speaker. He is a leader on issues for children living in families impacted by addiction and an advocate that recovery from addiction should include all family members.

== Early life ==
Jerry Moe grew up in San Francisco, the youngest of three children in a family that had struggled with addiction for many generations. At 14 he was starting to get into trouble when a teacher intervened and suggested he attend a program for teens affected by a loved one's drinking, Alateen. For the first time, Moe found himself surrounded by other kids his age going through the same experiences, feeling the same guilt, sadness, and confusion. Eventually, Moe's mother began attending Al-Anon and shortly after, Moe's father obtained sobriety through Alcoholics Anonymous. He lived the last 38 years of his life sober. This experience exemplified for Moe the importance of recovery for the whole family.

== Career ==
Moe began his career in education and realized that young children ages 7 to 12 years old were left out of the recovery process altogether – often being the first to be affected but the last to receive help and support. From his firsthand experience of a childhood and adolescence marred by alcoholism came a deep understanding of why children in that age group might need a helping hand to cope and to avoid alcoholism – or drug dependency – themselves. Moe began developing a psycho-educational program for young children impacted by addiction and found support for the program at Sequoia Hospital in Redwood City, CA, where the new program was successfully piloted for a 6-month period.

Moe served as National Director of Children's Programs at the Betty Ford Center.

== Professional highlights ==
In addition to his work at the Hazelden Betty Ford Foundation, Moe is one of the foremost experts on counseling for young children in families affected by addiction. He has written dozens of books and articles that are used by families and other professionals throughout the world. Moe has spoken in all 50 states and trained or presented in 24 countries. He has also spoken at the White House and on Capitol Hill, and has been interviewed frequently by local, state and national media.

Moe's work helping young children in families facing addiction has been featured on Sesame Street.

Since 2019, Moe has been a significant contributor to ‘Sesame Street in Communities’ and its initiative on parental addiction.

Moe lives with his family in Palm Desert, CA. He is a cancer survivor, father to three children and grandfather of four.

== Awards ==
- 2020 22nd Annual Firestone Award

== Books and articles ==
- Moe, Jerry & Johnson, Jeannette & Wade, Wendy. (2008). Evaluation of the Betty Ford Children's Program. Journal of Social Work Practice in the Addictions. 8. 464–489. 10.1080/15332560802310144.
- Arria, Amelia M et al. “Integration of parenting skills education and interventions in addiction treatment.” Journal of addiction medicine vol. 7,1 (2013): 1–7. doi:10.1097/ADM.0b013e318270f7b0
- Moe, Jerry and Poheman, Don. Kids' power: Healing Games for Children of Alcoholics. Tucson, AZ: ImaginWorks, 1989.
- Moe, Jerry and Ways, Peter. Conducting Support Groups for Elementary Children K-6: A Guide for Educators and Other Professionals. Minneapolis, MN: Johnson Institute, 1991.
- Moe, Jerry. Discovery: Finding the Buried Treasure. Dallas, TX: ImaginWorks, 1993.
- Brown, Cathey, LaPorte, Betty and Moe, Jerry. Kids' Power Too!: Words to Grow By. Dallas, TX: ImaginWorks, 1996.
- Moe, Jerry and Ziegler, Ross. The Children's Place. Hong Kong: QuinnEssentials Books & Printing Inc., 1998.
- Moe, Jerry. Understanding Addiction and Recovery Through a Child's Eyes. Deerfield Beach, FL: Health Communications, Inc., 2007.
