= Robert Stone (architect) =

American architect

- Born: August 15, 1968 (age 58); Palm Springs, California
- Education: University of California, Berkeley
- Occupation: Architect
- Practice: Robert Stone design, RSd
- Buildings: Rosa Muerta, Acido Dorado
- Website: robertstonedesign.com

Robert Stone is an American architect based in southern California.

== Biography ==
Robert Stone (b. August 15, 1968 in Palm Springs, California) attended the University of California at Berkeley for bachelor's and master's degrees in architectural studies, however regularly cites Los Angeles artists as his primary influences.

== Art work ==
Stone worked as an artist in Los Angeles through the early 2000s; producing both sculptural and architectural work. These projects were exhibited at Armand Hammer Museum of Art in Los Angeles; MoCA, Miami; the Cooper-Hewitt Design Museum in New York; and Los Angeles Museum of Contemporary Art.

== Architectural work ==
Stone is best known for his solo-built houses in the Southern California desert town of Joshua Tree, California. Rosa Muerta is a monochrome black indoor/outdoor pavilion which mixes Japanese references, Minimalism (of the art variety), and Lowrider Baroque. Acido Dorado is a metallic gold house with mirrored accents. Both houses use simple materials and careful details which Stone creates himself.

The houses have been published in Wallpaper, Abitare, Architectural Digest (US, France, Russia editions), Interior Design, Elle Décor (UK, France, China editions), Mark Magazine, Design Bureau, Glamour, Playboy (France), The Los Angeles Times, Surface Magazine, and Taschen's Architecture Now. Stones's new approach to architecture was adopted early by fashion photographers and has appeared in many fashion shoots.

== Sources ==
- Architecture Now- Houses, Taschen Books, 2011, Phillip Jodido.
- Another Magazine, April 2012, Fashion editorial by Jack Pierson.
- The Lab Magazine, Issue #4, Fashion editorial by Julia Galdo / Cody Cloud.
- Architectural Digest France, 2010 June, "Comme Un Mirage", Sophie Pinet.
- Luxury Home Quarterly, 2011 March, "Robert Stone", Zach Baliva.
- Elle Decor UK, 2010 October, "Gold Standard", Jo Froude.
- Mark, Issue #24, 2010 February, "Robert Stone", Katya Tylevich.
- Flair, 2010 September, "Acido Dorado", Giulia Toscini.
- Elle Decor UK, 2009 September, "Desert Gothic", Britt Collins.
- Gloss, 2010 September, "Acido Dorado", Katarina Peterlin.
- Mark, Issue #21, 2009 July, "Robert Stone", Katya Tylevich.
- Monument, 2010 September, "Robert Stone design", David Neustein.
- Architectural Digest Russia, 2010 July, "Acido Dorado", Doris Chevron.
- Casa International, October 2011, "Acido Dorado", Yuanzheng Chen.
- Design Bureau, September 2010, "Robert Stone design", Tarra Kieckhaefer.
- BG Magazine (Spain), September 2010, "Rosa Muerta", Adriana Argudo.
- Eigen Huis & Interieur, September 2010, "Acido Dorado", Erik Jager.
- Elle Décor Indonesia, Nov. 2010, "Acido Dorado", Hermawan Kurnianto.
- Playboy France, August 2010, "Acido Dorado", Sasha Eisenman.
- Roberto Cavalli 40 years, Rizzoli, photography by Mert & Marcus.
- Interior Design Magazine, September 2010, "A Machine for dreaming In", Greg Goldin.
- Los Angeles Times Magazine, May 4, 2010, "All That Glitters", Mayer Rus.
- Glamour Magazine, April 2010, Fashion editorial by Michele Laurita.
- Abitare Magazine, February 2010, "Acido Dorado", Fabrizio Gallanti.
- Vonhaus Magazine, Issue #8 April 2010, "Rosa Muerta".
- Elle Décor China, November 2009, "Rosa Muerta", Britt Collins.
- Elle Décor Russia, March 2010, "Rosa Muerta", Britt Collins.
- Hise Magazine, December 2009, "Rosa Muerta".
- Hinge Magazine (Hong Kong), November 2009,"Rosa Muerta".
- Atrium Magazine (Germany), October 2009, "Rosa Muerta".
- Borsen (Denmark), June 2009, "Rosa Muerta".
- Wallpaper, Virtual walkthrough Rosa Muerta, July 2009, Jonathan Bell.
- Los Angeles Times, April 3, 2009, "Desert Heart", Barbara Thornburg.
- Surface Magazine, Fall 2009, Fashion Editorial, Lane Coder.
- Surface Magazine, Summer 2009, Fashion Editorial, Lane Coder.
- Amica Magazine, March 2009, Fashion Editorial by Neil Kirk.
- Architecture, December 2002, Charles Sullivan.
- Metropolis, April 2001, Jade Chang.
- Declaration of Independents, Chronicle Books, 2001, John Read.
- Skin: Surface and Substance in Contemporary Design, Smithsonian Design Museum, 2001.
- The Los Angeles Times, To Live and Create in L.A, July 29, 2001, David Pagel.
- Snapshot: New Art from Los Angeles (catalog), Armand Hammer Museum, 2001.
