= Andrew Schär =

- Born: 14 December 1981 (age 44); Dundee, KwaZulu-Natal, South Africa
- Origin: South Africa (of Swiss-Belgian-German-Anglo-Irish-Portuguese ethnic background)
- Occupations: Film composer, voice over artist, actor, singer/songwriter, filmmaker, author.
- Instruments: Guitar, piano
- Website: andrewschar.com

Andrew Schär (born 14 December 1981) is a South African-born film composer, actor, and musician.

== Early life and education ==
Andrew was born on 14 December 1981, in Pietermaritzburg, Kwa-Zulu Natal, at Grey's Hospital, and was raised in Dundee, Kwa-Zulu Natal.

Andrew's family name, Schär, originates from Bern, Switzerland, but his ancestry also has roots in Belgium, Germany, Ireland, England, and most notably, Portugal, where his great, great-grandfather, Augusto César de Gouveia, was the Administrator of Madeira.

Andrew attended junior school in Dundee, and spent most of his free time fishing and hunting on farms in the area. At age 14, he left Dundee and attended Cordwalles Preparatory, in Pietermaritzburg for his Std. 6 year. Thereafter, he attended high-school at Hilton College, for four years, until matriculating in 1999.

From age 8, Andrew attended acting classes, and spent many hours acting in school productions, where he received his Honours for Drama, at Hilton College.

Although he sang in many musical productions, he only picked up the guitar at age 16. He attended one guitar lesson, but decided to teach himself how to play instead. He quickly began writing his own songs.

In sports, Andrew was a talented swimmer, and water-polo player, a skilled marksman, and he excelled in shot put. He was a school prefect in his final year.

In 2000, Andrew spent the year as a gap-student at a private preparatory school called West Hill Park, in Hampshire, England. He worked mostly as a groundsman, maintaining the sports-fields and school grounds. His spare time was spent writing songs.

After travelling Europe for a bit, he returned to South Africa to attend the University of Cape Town, where he studied for a bachelor's degree in information systems for three years. He furthered his studies in 2004, by completing an honours degree in information systems.

== Career ==
=== 2005–2008 ===
Andrew spent 2005 writing an album, part of which he recorded in London, in 2006, where he began pursuing a musical career.

In 2007, he returned to Cape Town. During that year, his song "Lost & Found" played on 5FM, and another of his songs, "Over You", was playing on KFM and Highveld Stereo, where it went at #1 on the HomeBru charts in its first week, and made it to #22 on the Take40SA. It continued to be play-listed for another two years.

Towards the end of 2007, Kia Motors America purchased his song "Where I'll Be" for use in their Kia Sorento: Frames, Commercial.

Andrew also began modelling, and signed with YModels, Cape Town. During that time, he featured in a South African Airways commercial, entitled "Speed Dating".

=== 2009–2012 ===
In 2009, Andrew began writing children's books, which were subsequently published by Shuter & Shooter Publishers.

During that time, he became a voice over artist, continued to write music, and also began a filmmaking business. His song "Warrior Poet", which was written as a theme song for the Ikey Tigers, was featured in the 2011 independent film, "Fathoms Deep". He also wrote the soundtrack to a documentary by Xenia Forrester, entitled 'Robot Artists', which was featured on CNN Africa.

In 2012, Andrew began the role of presenter for an online photography school, called Lunchbox, started by Adi Pienaar (of WooThemes), Iaan Van Niekerk and Christine Meintjes.

Towards the end of 2012, Andrew started a studio called 'Black Forest', based in Cape Town, where he composes music for film and television commercials.

=== 2013–present ===
Andrew is currently composing the music to a short film by writer/director Amanda Evans, entitled 'Instance', and is in talks with the same director to compose the music for the feature film, 'The Consequence', scheduled for production sometime in early 2014.

=== Studio albums ===
- The Great Escape (2006)

== Theater performances ==
Film
Year	Title	Role	Notes
1996	Joseph And His Technicolour Dreamcoat	Napthali	
1997	Romeo & Juliet	Tibalt	
1998	Of Mice & Men	Lennie	Awarded: Half-Colours
1998	Charlie Brown	Charlie Brown	
1999	The Cold Stone Jug	Prison Guard	Cameo
1999	The Pirates of Penzance	Pirate King	Awarded: Honours
