= 32 Poems =

American literary magazine

32 Poems Magazine (32 Poems) is a literary magazine, founded in the American states of Maryland and Texas in 2003, that has published poems from writers around the world.

== About ==
This independent magazine, founded by Deborah Ager and John Poch, made its debut at the 2003 Associated Writing Programs Conference in Baltimore, Maryland and publishes a winter issue in November and a spring issue in April. Each issue contains 32 poems for a total of 64 poems published per year. The magazine emphasizes shorter poetry, with many of the poems being less than a page in length. In the beginning, 32 Poems published only poetry. Since at least the Fall of 2013 it also publishes prose.

The Board members include C. Dale Young, B.H. Fairchild, Deborah Ager, and Grace Schulman.

32 Poems is currently edited by George David Clark.

== Contributors ==
Contributors have included: Billy Collins, Brigit Pegeen Kelly, Lydia Davis, Ricardo Pau-Llosa, A.E. Stallings, William Logan, G.C. Waldrep, Rosemary Winslow, Jeannine Hall Gailey, Chad Davidson, Paul Guest, Bob Hicok, H. L. Hix, James Hoch, Lia Purpura, Daniel Nester, Dan O'Brien, Robin Beth Schaer, Amit Majmudar, Lisa Russ Spaar, Bernadette Geyer, J.E. Pitts, Stephen Graham Jones, Lydia Davis, Katie Umans, Averill Curdy, Steven D. Schroeder, Christopher Cessac, Katie Chaple, Emily Walter, Diana Smith Bolton, Kelli Russell Agodon, Amanda Auchter, Andrea Hollander Budy, Jacqueline Kolosov, Sebastian Matthews, Daniele Pantano.

== See also ==
- List of literary magazines
