= Bernadette Geyer =

American writer

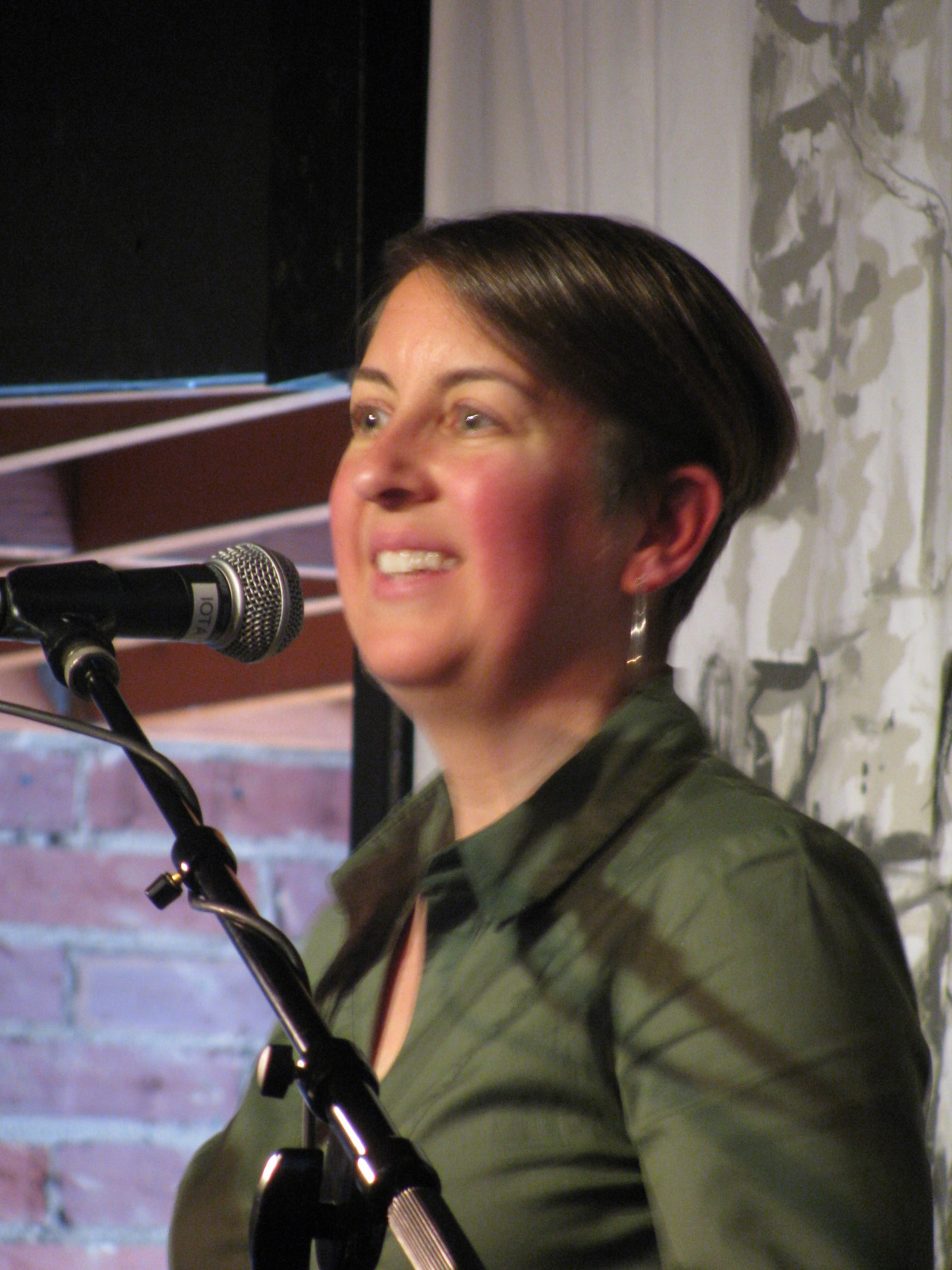
- Bernadette Geyer reading at Iota Poetry Series, 2013
- Born: June 16, 1968 (age 58)
- Education: Allegheny College
- Writing career
- Language: English
- Genre: Poetry

Bernadette K. Geyer (born June 16, 1968) is a poet, writer, translator, and editor in Berlin, Germany.

== Life ==
She graduated from Allegheny College. She worked for the US Fuel Cell Council, and was deputy director of Fuel Cells 2000; she served as editor-in-chief of The Word Works, and works as a writer/editor/translator in Berlin, Germany.

Her writings and translations have appeared in Oxford American, The Massachusetts Review, Barrow Street, Hotel Amerika, The Marlboro Review, South Dakota Review, The Midwest Quarterly, The Potomac Review, Gargoyle, 32 poems, The Evansville Review, culture: the word on cheese, AFAR Magazine, Birmingham Poetry Review, and the 2015 Poet's Market.

She read at the Poetry at Noon Series at the Library of Congress.

== Awards ==
- Selected by Cornelius Eady for the Hilary Tham Capital Collection imprint of The Word Works in 2012, resulting in the publication of her first full-length book, The Scabbard of Her Throat
- Recipient of a 2010 Strauss Fellowship from the Arts Council of Fairfax County.
- Finalist for the OSU Press/The Journal Award in Poetry, and the Richard Snyder Publication Prize from Ashland Press, for Dead Men
- 2000 Moving Words Competition.

== Works ==
- "WHITE HOUSE PLUMBER, 27 YEARS"; "FACTORY, MILAN"; "THE ROSE FORGETS ITS BEAUTY"; "I BECOME LIKE PROUST"; "THE FOOT REMEMBERS ITS FAVORITE SHOE"; "THREE BIRDS", Beltway Poetry Quarterly, Volume 8, Number 3, Summer 2007
- "MY MOTHER’S THUMBS", THE INNISFREE POETRY JOURNAL, September 16, 2007
- "Lessons", American Journal of Nursing, May 2010
- "Parable of the Great Outpouring", Heron Tree, 2 February 2014
- "Not Necessarily in Order", Poetry Midwest, Winter 2004
- "Thumbelina’s Mother Speaks: To the Toad’s Mother", 32 Poems, Fall 2008
- What Remains. Argonne House Press. ISBN 978-1-887641-50-0.
- The Scabbard of Her Throat. The Word Works. ISBN 978-0-915380-85-5.
- My Cruel Invention: A Contemporary Poetry Anthology, editor. Meerkat Press. ISBN 978-0-9966262-0-0

=== Non-Fiction ===
- "A Cheese-Lover's Guide to Berlin," culture: the word on cheese, December 2017.
- "Dorothy Parker". The Literary Encyclopedia. 27 April 2006.
- "Throwing off the Shackles of the To-Read Wish List," Submittable Blog, December 2017.
- "Broken Hallelujahs, poems by Sean Thomas Dougherty", Montserrat Review
- "A Fuel Cell Primer", IAEI News

=== Anthologies ===
- Robert Lee Brewer, ed. (2014). 2015 Poet's Market. Writer's Digest Books. ISBN 978-1-59963-844-7.
- Rachel Hadas, ed. (2013). The Waiting Room Reader II. CavanKerry Press. ISBN 978-1-933880-34-1.
- Deborah Ager, Bill Beverly, John Poch, eds. (2013). Old Flame: From the First 10 Years of 32 Poems Magazine. WordFarm. ISBN 978-1-60226-013-9.
- Moira Richards; Rosemary Starace; Lesley Wheeler, eds. (2008). Letters to the World. Red Hen Press. ISBN 978-1-59709-099-5.
- Robert L. Giron, ed. (2005). Poetic Voices without Borders. Gival Press. ISBN 978-1-928589-30-3.
- Sarah Browning, ed. (2003). D.C. Poets Against the War. Argonne House Press. ISBN 978-1-887641-99-9.
