= Kyer =

Kyer is a surname of German origin, and an Americanized variant of Geier. Notable people with the surname include:

- Julian Kyer (born 1988), American track and road cyclist
- Kristopher Kyer (born 1958), American actor, dialogue coach and acting coach
