= Bill Beverly =

American novelist

William Beverly
- Born: 1965 (age 60–61)
- Education: Kalamazoo Central High School; Oberlin College; University of Florida (PhD)
- Occupation: Writer
- Spouse: Deborah Ager
- Writing career
- Genre: True crime

William Beverly (born 1965) is an American crime writer, author of the 2016 novel Dodgers, winner of the Gold Dagger, an award given by the Crime Writers' Association for the best crime novel of the year. In 2017 Dodgers won the Los Angeles Times Book Prize for Mystery/Thriller and British Book Award in the Crime and Thrillers category, as well as the Mark Twain American Voice in Literature Award.

== Early life ==
Beverly grew up in Kalamazoo, Michigan, attending Kalamazoo Central High School. He studied at Oberlin College and the University of Florida, where he earned a Ph.D. in American literature for his work on criminal fugitive stories, research that became the basis for his first book, On the Lam: Narratives of Flight in J. Edgar Hoover's America.

== Career ==
Between 2003 and 2012, Beverly was a contributing editor with 32 Poems, a poetry magazine founded by publisher Deborah Ager and poetry editor John Poch.

His first novel, Dodgers, was published in 2016 by Crown Publishing in North America, by No Exit Press in the United Kingdom, by Southside Stories in Sweden and by Editions Seuil in France.

Beverly teaches American literature and writing at Trinity Washington University in Washington DC.

== Personal life ==
Beverly and his wife, the poet and writer Deborah Ager, live in Hyattsville, Maryland. Beverly is also an avid collector of beer cans from California with a collection of 1,000 or more cans.

== Publications ==
- On the Lam: Narratives of Flight in J. Edgar Hoover's America (2003)
- Old Flame: From the First 10 Years of 32 Poems Magazine (coedited with John Poch and Deborah Ager, 2013)
- Dodgers (2016)
