= Saving Mr. Banks =

2013 film by John Lee Hancock

- Theatrical release poster
- Directed by: John Lee Hancock
- Written by: Kelly Marcel; Sue Smith
- Produced by: Alison Owen; Ian Collie; Philip Steuer
- Starring: Emma Thompson; Tom Hanks; Paul Giamatti; Jason Schwartzman; Bradley Whitford; Colin Farrell
- Cinematography: John Schwartzman
- Edited by: Mark Livolsi
- Music by: Thomas Newman
- Production companies: Walt Disney Pictures; Ruby Films; Essential Media and Entertainment; BBC Films; Hopscotch Features
- Distributed by: Walt Disney Studios; Motion Pictures
- Release dates: October 20, 2013 (BFI London Film Festival); November 29, 2013 (United Kingdom); December 13, 2013 (United States); January 9, 2014 (Australia)
- Running time: 125 minutes
- Countries: Australia; United Kingdom; United States
- Language: English
- Budget: $35 million
- Box office: $117.9 million

Saving Mr. Banks is a 2013 biographical film directed by John Lee Hancock and written by Kelly Marcel and Sue Smith. Centered on the development of the 1964 film Mary Poppins, the film stars Emma Thompson as book author P. L. Travers and Tom Hanks as film producer Walt Disney, with supporting performances by Paul Giamatti, Jason Schwartzman, Bradley Whitford, Colin Farrell, Ruth Wilson, and B. J. Novak. Deriving its title from the father in Travers's story, Saving Mr. Banks depicts the author's tragic childhood in rural Queensland in 1906 and the two weeks of meetings during 1961 in Los Angeles, during which Disney attempts to obtain the film rights to her novels.

Essential Media and Entertainment and BBC Films initially developed Saving Mr. Banks as an independent production until 2011, when producer Alison Owen approached Walt Disney Pictures for permission to use copyrighted elements. The film's subject matter piqued Disney's interest, leading the studio to acquire the screenplay and produce the film. Principal photography commenced the following year in September before wrapping in November 2012; the film was shot almost entirely in the Southern California area, primarily at the Walt Disney Studios in Burbank, where a majority of the film's narrative takes place.

Saving Mr. Banks premiered at the BFI London Film Festival on October 20, 2013, and was distributed theatrically by Walt Disney Studios Motion Pictures that same year in the United Kingdom on November 29 and in North America on December 13. The film received positive reviews, and was named one of the 10 best films of 2013 by the National Board of Review and the American Film Institute, and was also commercially successful, grossing over $117 million at the worldwide box office. Thompson's performance garnered BAFTA, Golden Globe, and Screen Actors Guild nominations for Best Actress, while composer Thomas Newman earned an Academy Award nomination for Best Original Score.

== Plot ==
In London 1961, literary agent Diarmuid Russell urges financially strapped author Pamela "P. L." Travers to travel to Los Angeles and meet with Walt Disney, who has pursued the film rights to her Mary Poppins stories for 20 years after having promised his daughters to produce a film based on the books. Travers has steadfastly resisted Disney's efforts, fearing what he will do to her character. Having written nothing new and her book royalties having dried up, she risks losing her house. Russell reminds her that Disney has agreed to two major stipulations (no animation and unprecedented script approval) before she finally agrees to go.

Flashbacks depict Travers's difficult childhood in Allora, Queensland, Australia in 1906, which became the inspiration for much of Mary Poppins. Travers idolized her loving, imaginative father, Travers Robert Goff, but his chronic alcoholism resulted in his repeated dismissals, strained her parents' marriage and caused her distressed mother's attempted suicide. Goff died from tuberculosis when Travers was eight years old. Prior to his death, her mother's stern, practical sister came to live with the family and later served as Travers's main inspiration for the Mary Poppins character.

In Los Angeles, Travers is shocked by the city's nature and the overly perky inhabitants, personified by her friendly limousine driver, Ralph. At the Walt Disney Studios in Burbank, Travers meets the creative team who are developing Mary Poppins for the screen: screenwriter Don DaGradi and songwriters Richard and Robert Sherman. She finds their presumptions and casual manners highly improper, a view that she also holds of the jocular Disney.

Travers's working relationship with Disney and his team is difficult from the outset, with her insistence that Mary Poppins is the enemy of sentiment and whimsy. Disney and his people are puzzled by Travers's disdain for whimsy, given the nature of the Mary Poppins story, as well as Travers's own rich imagination. She particularly objects to how the character George Banks, the children's estranged father, is depicted, insisting that he is neither cold nor cruel. Gradually, the team grasp how deeply personal the Mary Poppins stories are to Travers and how many of the characters were inspired by her past.

The team acknowledges that Travers has valid criticisms and make changes, although she becomes increasingly disengaged as painful childhood memories resurface. Seeking to understand what troubles her, Disney invites Travers to Disneyland, which, along with her developing friendship with Ralph, the creative team's revisions to the George Banks character, the addition of a new song and a different ending, help dissolve Travers's opposition. Her creativity reawakens, and she begins collaborating with the team. Soon afterward, however, Travers discovers an animation sequence with dancing penguins has been added without her permission. Travers confronts Disney over this and returns to London in a huff without signing the agreement.

Disney learns that "P. L. Travers" is a pen name, taken from Travers's father's given name; her real name is Helen Goff, and she is Australian, not British. This gives Disney new insight into Travers, and he follows her to London. Arriving unexpectedly at her home, Disney, who had begun to realise that Travers's father has played a vital role in her books and the film, shares his own less-than-ideal childhood but stresses the healing value of his art. He urges Travers not to let deeply rooted past disappointments dictate the present. That night, after Disney has left, Travers finally relents and grants the film rights to him.

Three years later, in 1964, Travers has begun writing another Mary Poppins story, while the film Mary Poppins itself is to have its world premiere at Grauman's Chinese Theatre in Hollywood. Disney has not invited Travers, fearing how she might react with the press watching. Prompted by Russell, Travers shows up unannounced at Disney's office; he reluctantly issues her an invitation. Initially, she watches Mary Poppins with a lack of enthusiasm, particularly with the animated penguins. Travers gradually warms to the rest of the film, however, becoming deeply moved by the depiction of George Banks's personal crisis and redemption.

== Cast ==
- Emma Thompson as Pamela "P. L." Travers, birth name Helen Goff, author of Mary Poppins
  - Annie Rose Buckley as seven-year-old Helen, also referred to as "Ginty"
- Tom Hanks as Walt Disney, film producer and studio mogul
- Colin Farrell as Travers Robert Goff, Helen's loving but self-destructive father, on whom the Mr. Banks character is based
- Paul Giamatti as Ralph, Travers's chauffeur
- Jason Schwartzman as Richard M. Sherman, composer and lyricist who wrote Mary Poppins' songs
- Bradley Whitford as Don DaGradi, co-writer of the screenplay for Mary Poppins
- Ruth Wilson as Margaret Goff, Helen's mother
- B. J. Novak as Robert B. Sherman, composer and lyricist who co-wrote the film's songs with his younger brother Richard
- Rachel Griffiths as Helen "Ellie" Morehead, Helen's maternal aunt, who serves as the model for Mary Poppins
- Kathy Baker as Tommie, Disney's executive assistant
- Melanie Paxson as Dolly, Disney's secretary
- Ronan Vibert as Diarmuid Russell, Travers's literary agent
- Kristopher Kyer as Dick Van Dyke (uncredited)
- Victoria Summer as Julie Andrews (uncredited)

Credits adapted from The New York Times.

== Production ==
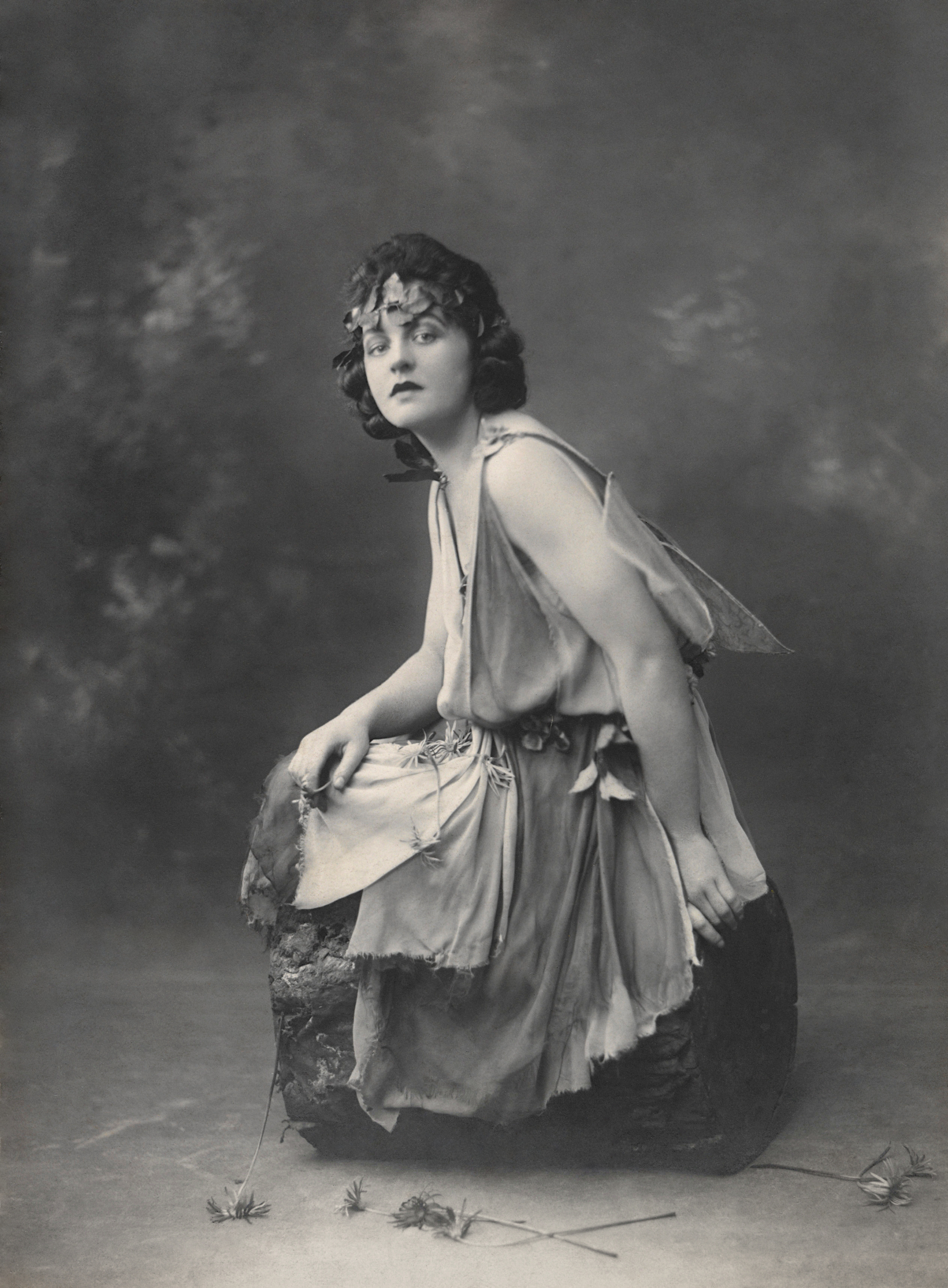
P. L. Travers in 1922

=== Development ===
In 2002, Australian producer Ian Collie produced a documentary film on P. L. Travers titled The Shadow of "Mary Poppins". During the documentary's production, Collie noticed that there was "an obvious biopic there" and convinced Essential Media and Entertainment to develop a feature film with Sue Smith writing the screenplay. The project attracted the attention of BBC Films, which decided to finance the project, and Ruby Films' Alison Owen, who subsequently hired Kelly Marcel to co-write the screenplay with Smith. Marcel's drafts removed a subplot involving Travers and her son, and divided the story into a two-part narrative: the creative conflict between Travers and Walt Disney, and her dealings with her childhood issues, describing it as "a story about the pain of a little girl who suffered, and the grown woman who allowed herself to let go". Marcel's version, however, featured certain intellectual property rights of music and imagery which would be impossible to use without permission from The Walt Disney Company. "There was always that elephant in the room, which is Disney," Collie recalled. "We knew Walt Disney was a key character in the film and we wanted to use quite a bit of the music. We knew we'd eventually have to show Disney." In early 2010, Robert B. Sherman provided Owen with an advance copy of a salient chapter from his then upcoming book release, Moose: Chapters From My Life. The chapter entitled, "'Tween Pavement and Stars" contained characterizations and anecdotes which proved seminal to Marcel's script rewrite, in particular, the anecdote about there not being the color red in London. In July 2011, while attending the Ischia Film Festival, Owen met with Corky Hale, who offered to present the screenplay to Richard M. Sherman. Sherman read the screenplay and gave the producers his support. Later that year, Marcel and Smith's screenplay was listed in Franklin Leonard's The Black List, voted by producers as one of the best screenplays that were not in production.

In November 2011, Walt Disney Pictures' president of production, Sean Bailey, was informed by executive Tendo Nagenda of Marcel's existing script. Realizing that the screenplay included a depiction of the studio's namesake, Bailey conferred with Disney CEO Bob Iger and Walt Disney Studios chairman Alan Horn, the latter of whom referred to the film as a "brand deposit," a term adopted from Steve Jobs. Together, the executives discussed the studio's potential choices; purchase the script and shut the project down, put the film in turnaround, or co-produce the film themselves. With executive approval, Disney acquired the screenplay in February 2012 and joined the production with Owen, Collie and Philip Steuer as producers, and Christine Langan, Troy Lum, Andrew Mason, and Paul Trijbits serving as executive producers. John Lee Hancock was hired to direct the film later that same month.

Iger subsequently contacted Tom Hanks to consider playing the role of Walt Disney, which would become the first-ever focal depiction of Disney in a mainstream film. Hanks accepted the role and made several visits to the Walt Disney Family Museum and interviewed some of Disney's former employees and family relatives, including his daughter Diane Disney Miller. The film was subsequently dedicated to Disney Miller, who died shortly before it was released. In April 2012, Emma Thompson entered final negotiations to star as P. L. Travers, after the studio was unable to secure Meryl Streep for the part. Thompson said that the role was the most difficult one that she has played, describing Travers as "a woman of quite eye-watering complexity and contradiction." "She wrote a very good essay on sadness, because she was, in fact, a very sad woman. She'd had a very rough childhood, the alcoholism of her father being part of it and the attempted suicide of her mother being another part of it. I think that she spent her whole life in a state of fundamental inconsolability and hence got a lot done." Colin Farrell, Paul Giamatti, Jason Schwartzman, Bradley Whitford, B. J. Novak, and Ruth Wilson were cast in July 2012.

"I thought the script was a fair portrayal of Walt as a mogul but also as an artist and a human being. But I still had concerns that it could be whittled away. I don't think this script could have been developed within the walls of Disney—it had to be developed outside ... I'm not going to say there weren't discussions, but the movie we ended up with is the one that was on the page."

— John Lee Hancock on his initial thoughts of Disney's involvement

With Disney's backing, the production team was given access to 36 hours of Travers's audio recordings of herself, the Shermans, and co-writer Don DaGradi that were produced during the development of Mary Poppins, in addition to letters written between Disney and Travers from the 1940s through the 1960s. Richard M. Sherman also worked on the film as a music supervisor and shared his side of his experiences working with Travers on Mary Poppins. Initially, Hancock had reservations about Disney's involvement with the film, believing that the studio would edit the screenplay in their co-founders favor. However, Marcel admitted that the studio "specifically didn't want to come in and sanitize it or change Walt in any way." Hancock elaborated, "I was still worried that they might want to chip away at Walt a little bit ... I thought the portrayal of Walt was fair and human, so I came in and they said, 'No, we like it.' But still, every step of the way, I had my fist balled up behind my back ready to fight in case it happened, but it didn't." Although the filmmakers did not receive any creative interference from Disney regarding Walt Disney's depiction, the studio did request that they omit any onscreen inhalation of cigarettes (a decision that Hanks himself disagreed with) due to the company's policy of not directly depicting smoking in films released under the Walt Disney Pictures banner, and to avoid receiving an R-rating from the Motion Picture Association. Instead, Disney is shown extinguishing a lit cigarette in one scene, stating that nobody can see him smoking due to the effect it would have on his image. Additionally, his notorious smoker's cough is heard off-screen several times throughout the film.

=== Filming ===
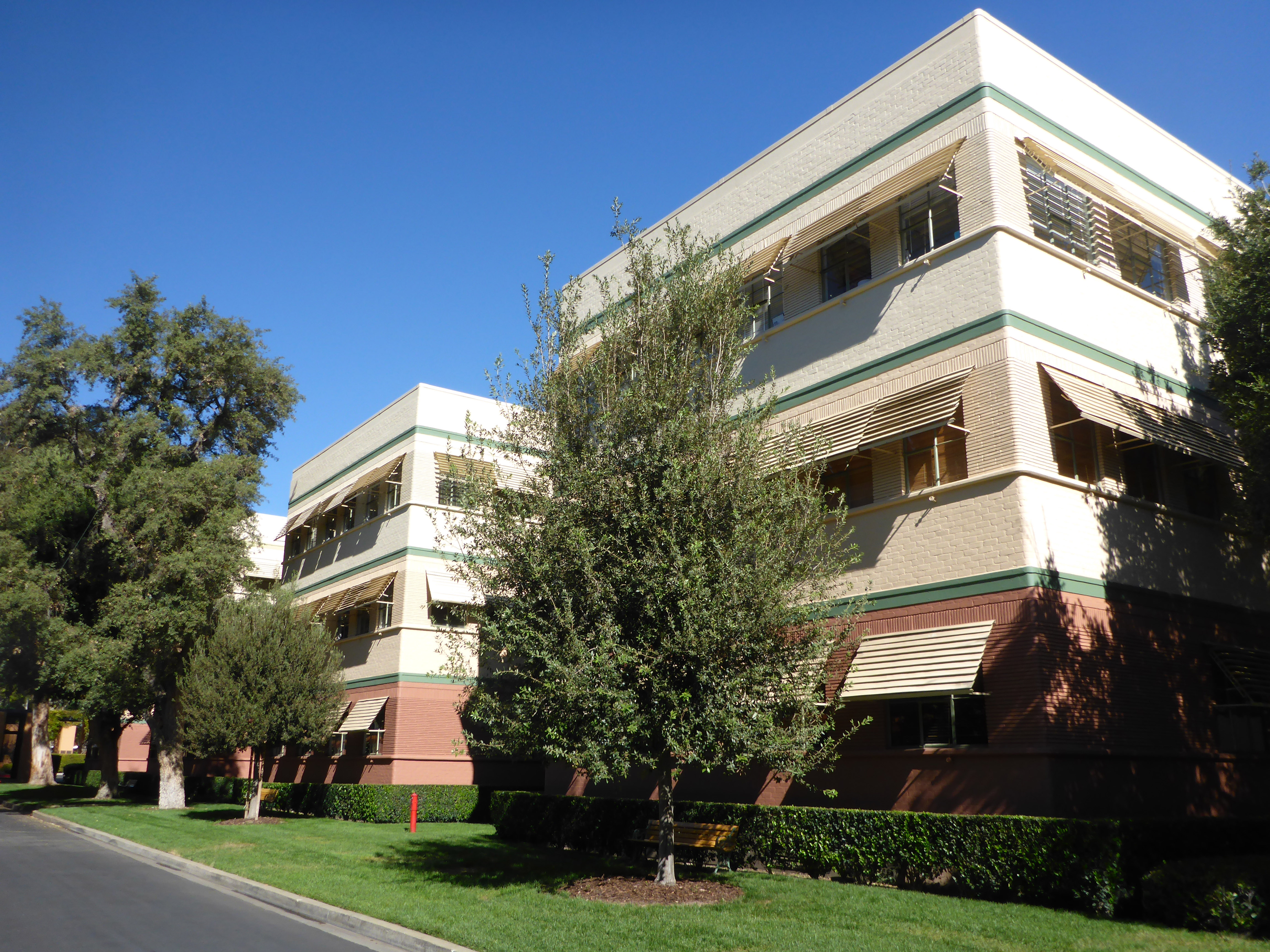
The former Animation Building on the Walt Disney Studios lot, which served as a primary filming location for the film.

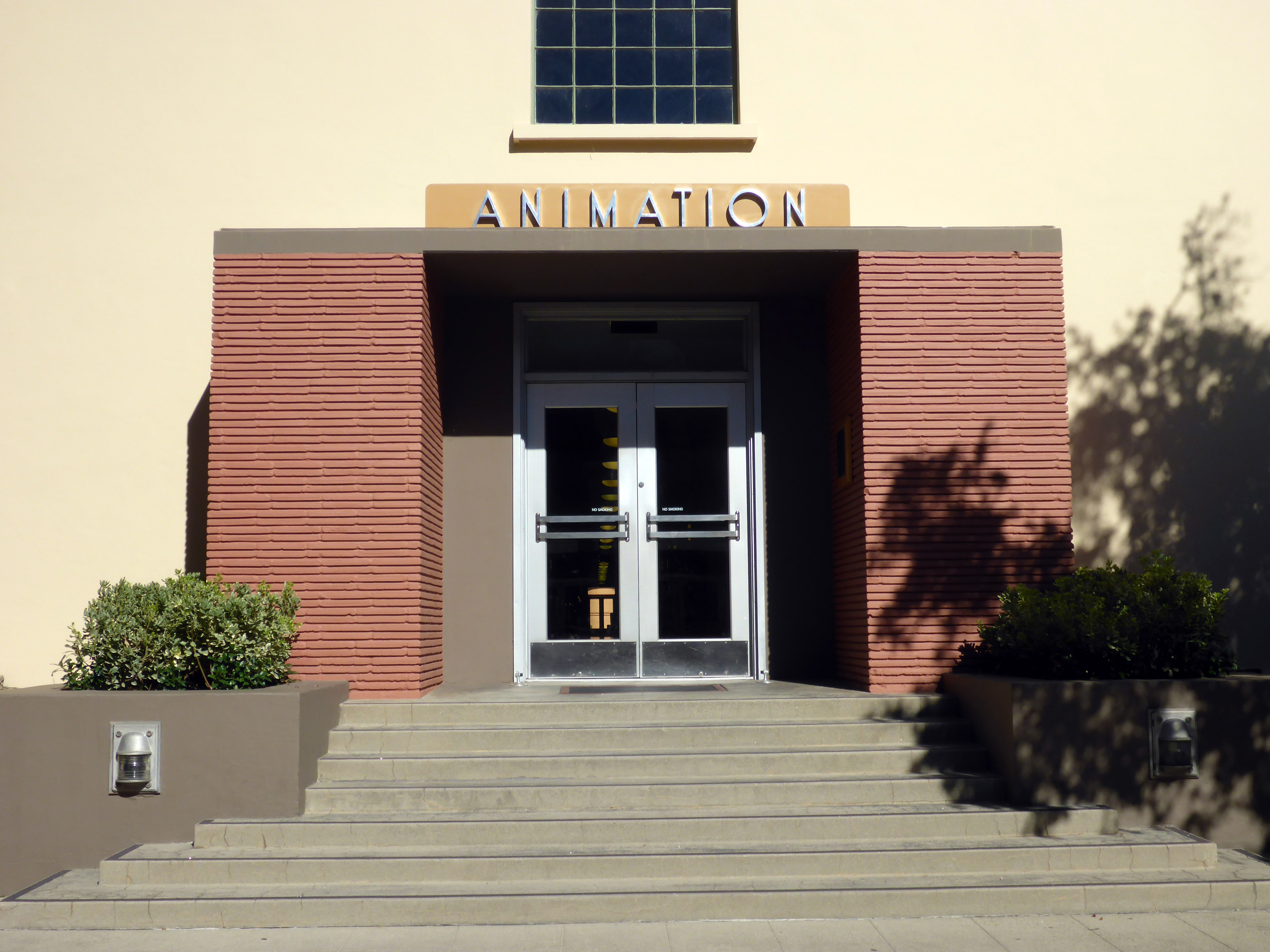
The building's south entrance, which was used in establishing shots in the film (followed by interior scenes shot on a soundstage).

Principal photography began on September 19, 2012 in Los Angeles. Although some scenes were originally planned to be shot in Queensland, Australia, all filming, except for two establishing shots in London, took place in the Southern California area, including the Walt Disney Studios lot in Burbank, Disneyland Park in Anaheim, Big Sky Ranch in Simi Valley, the Los Angeles County Arboretum and Botanic Garden in Arcadia, Heritage Square Museum in Montecito Heights, Ontario International Airport in San Bernardino, Courthouse Square at Universal Studios, and the TCL Chinese Theatre in Hollywood. The largest set built for the film was the interior of the Walt Disney Studios' Animation Building, which production designer Michael Corenblith referred to as "a character in the story". The exterior of the Beverly Hills Hotel and Disney's personal office were also recreated, with the Langham Huntington in Pasadena acting as an interior double for the Beverly Hills Hotel. To ensure authenticity, Corenblith used photographs and a furniture display from the Ronald Reagan Presidential Library as references for Disney's office; the set was also adorned with Disney's personal Academy Awards loaned from a Walt Disney World Resort exhibit. For the Disneyland sequences, scenes were shot during the early morning with certain areas cordoned off during the park's operation, including the park's entrance courtyard, Main Street U.S.A., Sleeping Beauty Castle, Fantasyland, and the King Arthur Carrousel attraction. Extra roles were filled by Disneyland Resort cast members. In order for the park to be portrayed accurately in the story's time period, Corenblith had the Main Street storefronts redressed to reflect their 1961 appearance; post-1961 attractions were kept obstructed so they would not show up on camera, although Pinocchio's Daring Journey, which opened in the 1980s, can be seen in the background of one scene. To recreate the original film's premiere at the Chinese Theatre, set designers closed Hollywood Boulevard and recreated the street and theater to resemble their 1964 appearances. After scheduled filming in Australia had been scrapped, cinematographer John Schwartzman compared the landscape of Queensland with that of rural Southern California, and realized that both had similar traits in natural lighting.

"I was immediately dry-mouthed by the prospect. It's just the hardest work that is to be done. There's a billion hours of video, of Walt performing as Walt Disney, being a great guy. But I found enough actual footage of him in interviews when he'd really like to be done with the subject ... When I could find him showing any legitimate kind of consternation, that was worth its weight in gold."

— Tom Hanks in regards to portraying Disney.

Emma Thompson prepared for her role by studying Travers's books and letters, as well as Travers's own recordings conducted during the development of Mary Poppins, and also styled her natural hair after Travers's, due to the actress's disdain for wigs. To accurately convey Walt Disney's midwestern dialect, Tom Hanks listened to archival recordings of Disney and practiced the voice while reading newspapers. Hanks also grew his own mustache for the role, which underwent heavy scrutiny, with the filmmakers going so far as to match the dimensions of Hanks's mustache to that of Disney's. Jason Schwartzman and B. J. Novak worked closely with Richard M. Sherman during pre-production and filming. Sherman described the actors as "perfect talents" for their roles as himself and his brother, Robert. Costume designer Daniel Orlandi had Thompson wear authentic jewelry borrowed from the Walt Disney Family Museum, and ensured that Hanks's wardrobe included the Smoke Tree Ranch emblem from the Palm Springs property embroidered on his neckties, which Disney always wore. The design department also had to recreate several of the costumed Disney characters as they appeared in the 1960s. Filming lasted nine weeks and was completed on November 22, 2012. Walt Disney Animation Studios reproduced animation of Tinker Bell for the scene that recreates an opening segment from an episode of Walt Disney Presents. The film was filmed in 2.40:1 widescreen.

=== Music ===
Thomas Newman composed the film's original score. In regards to incorporating his own musical style to the film's period setting, Newman stated that "there was room for a real tune-based score here that could reflect the basic joy in that kind of writing that the Sherman Brothers brought to Mary Poppins. Newman, however, refrained from creating an "adaptation score" of the Shermans' music from the original film. Newman's process of scoring the film included playing themes to filmed scenes, so that he could "listen to what the music does to an image", and not wanting to "clutter the proceedings with music." The flashback sequences to Travers's childhood provided the most work for Newman. He explains that, "You had to turn on a dime to make the transition back to the 'present,' when Travers and the Sherman brothers are working on the script for Mary Poppins. And that was fun, but also musically challenging." For the score's instrumentation, Newman primarily employed a string orchestra with some woodwinds and brass, as well as including piano and hammered instruments that were "appropriate to the time period", such as dulcimers. The film's score was recorded at the Newman Scoring Stage in Los Angeles, while the cast recorded several of the Shermans' songs at Capitol Studios for use as playback during the film's diegetic music scenes, including "Chim Chim Cher-ee", "Supercalifragilisticexpialidocious", "A Spoonful of Sugar", "Fidelity Fiduciary Bank", "Feed the Birds", and "Let's Go Fly a Kite". Walt Disney Records released two editions of the soundtrack on December 10, 2013: a single-disc and a two-disc digipak deluxe edition, containing original demo recordings by the Shermans and selected songs from Mary Poppins.

== Historical accuracy ==
Saving Mr. Banks depicts several events that differ from recorded accounts. The premise of the script, that Walt Disney had to convince P. L. Travers to hand over the film rights, including the scene in which he finally persuades her, is fictionalized. Disney had already secured the film rights (subject to Travers's approval of the script) when she arrived to consult with the Disney staff. In fact, Disney left Burbank to vacation in Palm Springs a few days into Travers's visit and was not present at the studio when several of the film's scenes depicting him to be present actually took place. As such, many of the dialogue scenes between Travers and Disney are adapted from letters, telegrams, and telephone correspondence between the two. Although Travers was assigned a limousine driver, the character of Ralph is fictionalized and intended to be an amalgamation of the studio's drivers. In real life, Disney story editor Bill Dover was assigned as Travers's guide and companion during her time in Los Angeles.

The film also depicts Travers coming to amicable terms with Disney, implying her approval of his changes to the story. In reality, she never approved of softening the harsher aspects of Mary Poppins's character, remained ambivalent about the music, and never came around to the use of animation. Disney overruled her objections to portions of the final film, citing contract stipulations that he had final cut privilege. Travers had initially not been invited to the film's premiere until she embarrassed a Disney executive into extending her an invitation, which is depicted in the film as coaxing Disney himself. After the premiere, she reportedly approached Disney and told him that the animated sequences had to be removed. Disney dismissed her request, saying, "Pamela, the ship has sailed."

Although the film portrays Travers as being emotionally moved during the premiere of Mary Poppins, overlaid with images of her childhood, which is implied to be attributed to her feelings about her father, co-screenwriter Kelly Marcel and several critics note that in real life, Travers's show of emotion was actually a result of deep frustration over the final product. Reportedly, Travers felt that in the end, the film betrayed the artistic integrity of her work and story's characters. Resentful over what she considered poor treatment at the hands of Walt Disney, Travers vowed never to permit Disney to adapt her other novels for any purpose. Travers's last will bans any future American adaptation of her works to any form of media. According to the Chicago Tribune, Disney was "indulging in a little revisionist history with an upbeat spin," adding, "the truth was always complicated" and that Travers subsequently viewed the film multiple times, and that her opinion of it had softened by the late 1970s.

English writer Brian Sibley found Travers still gun-shy from her experiences with Disney when he was hired in the 1980s to write a possible Mary Poppins sequel. Sibley reported that Travers told him, "I could only agree if I could do it on my own terms. I'd have to work with someone I trust." Regardless, while watching the original film together, the first time Travers had seen it since the premiere, she became excited at times and thought certain aspects were excellent, while others were terrible. The sequel never went to production and when approached to do a stage adaptation in the 1990s, she acquiesced only on the condition that British writers and no one from the film production were to be directly involved with the musical's development.

The film also depicts Travers's Aunt Ellie (her mother's sister), who comes to help the family when her father becomes terminally ill, as Travers's model for Mary Poppins, with the character even using several of Poppins's catchphrases from the film. In fact, Travers identified her great-aunt Helen Morehead (her mother's aunt) as the model for Poppins. The film shows her typing her next story for a book in 1964, titled Mary Poppins in the Kitchen; the book was actually published in 1975.

== Release ==
Walt Disney Studios Motion Pictures released a trailer for the film on July 10, 2013. Saving Mr. Banks held its world premiere at the Odeon Leicester Square as the closing gala of the 57th BFI London Film Festival on October 20, 2013. On November 7, 2013, Disney held the film's U.S. premiere at the TCL Chinese Theatre during the opening night of the 2013 AFI Film Festival, the same location where Mary Poppins premiered. The original film was also screened for its 50th anniversary.

Saving Mr. Banks also served as the Gala Presentation at the 2013 Napa Valley Film Festival on November 13, and was screened at the AARP Film Festival in Los Angeles on November 17, as Disney heavily campaigned Saving Mr. Banks for Academy Awards consideration. On December 9, 2013, the film was given an exclusive corporate premiere in the Main Theater of the Walt Disney Studios lot in Burbank. The film was released theatrically in the United States on December 13, 2013, and in general theatrical release on December 20.

=== Home media ===
Walt Disney Studios Home Entertainment released Saving Mr. Banks on Blu-ray, DVD, and digital download on March 18, 2014. The film debuted at No. 2 in Blu-ray and DVD sales in the United States according to Nielsen's sales chart. The home media release included three scenes that were cut from the film.

== Reception ==
=== Box office ===
Saving Mr. Banks grossed $83.3 million in North America and $34.6 million in other countries, for a worldwide total of $117.9 million, against a budget of $35 million. The film grossed $9.3 million in its opening weekend in the United States, finishing 5th at the box office behind The Hobbit: The Desolation of Smaug ($31.5 million), Anchorman 2: The Legend Continues ($26.2 million), Frozen ($19.6 million), and American Hustle ($19.1 million).

=== Critical response ===
On review aggregator website Rotten Tomatoes, 79% of 260 critics gave the film a positive review, with an average rating of 7/10. The site's critical consensus reads, "Aggressively likable and sentimental to a fault, Saving Mr. Banks pays tribute to the Disney legacy with excellent performances and sweet, high-spirited charm." Metacritic assigned the film a weighted average score of 65 out of 100, based on 46 critics, indicating "generally favorable reviews". Audiences polled by CinemaScore gave the film an average grade of "A" on an A+ to F scale.

Leslie Felprin of The Hollywood Reporter praised the film as an "affecting if somewhat soft-soaped comedy drama, elevated by excellent performances." The Reporter wrote that "Emma Thompson takes charge of the central role of P. L. Travers with an authority that makes you wonder how anybody else could ever have been considered." Scott Foundas of Variety wrote that the film "has all the makings of an irresistible backstage tale, and it's been brought to the screen with a surplus of old-fashioned Disney showmanship ...", and that Tom Hanks's portrayal captured Walt Disney's "folksy charisma and canny powers of persuasion — at once father, confessor and the shrewdest of businessmen." Overall, he praised the film as "very rich in its sense of creative people and their spirit of self-reinvention."

The Washington Post's Ann Hornaday rated the film three out of four stars, writing: "Saving Mr. Banks doesn't always straddle its stories and time periods with the utmost grace. But the film — which John Lee Hancock directed from a script by Kelly Marcel and Sue Smith — more than makes up for its occasionally unwieldy structure in telling a fascinating and ultimately deeply affecting story, along the way giving viewers tantalizing glimpses of the beloved 1964 movie musical, in both its creation and final form." The New York Times' A. O. Scott gave a positive review, declaring the film as "an embellished, tidied-up but nonetheless reasonably authentic glimpse of the Disney entertainment machine at work."

Mark Kermode writing for The Observer awarded the film four out of five stars, lauding Thompson's performance as "impeccable", elaborating that "Thompson dances her way through Travers's conflicting emotions, giving us a fully rounded portrait of a person who is hard to like but impossible not to love." Michael Phillips of the Chicago Tribune felt similarly, writing: "Thompson's the show. Each withering put-down, every jaundiced utterance, lands with a little ping." In regard to the screenplay, he wrote that "screenwriters Kelly Marcel and Sue Smith treat everyone gently and with the utmost respect." Peter Travers of Rolling Stone also gave the film three out of four stars and equally commended the performances of the cast.

Alonso Duralde of TheWrap described the film as a "whimsical, moving and occasionally insightful tale ... director John Lee Hancock luxuriates in the period detail of early-'60s Disney-ana". Entertainment Weekly gave the film a "B+" grade, explaining that "the trick here is how perfectly Thompson and Hanks portray the gradual thaw in their characters' frosty alliance, empathizing with each other's equally miserable upbringings in a beautiful three-hankie scene late in the film." Kenneth Turan of the Los Angeles Times wrote that the film "does not strictly hew to the historical record where the eventual resolution of this conflict is concerned," but admitted that it "is easy to accept this fictionalizing as part of the price to be paid for Thompson's engaging performance."

David Gritten of The Daily Telegraph described the confrontational interaction between Thompson and Hanks as "terrific", singling out Thompson's "bravura performance", and calling the film itself "smart, witty entertainment". Kate Muir of The Times spoke highly of Thompson and Hanks's performances. Joe Morgenstern of The Wall Street Journal, however, considered Colin Farrell to be the film's "standout performance". IndieWire's Ashley Clark wrote that the film "is witty, well-crafted and well-performed mainstream entertainment which, perhaps unavoidably, cleaves to a well-worn Disney template stating that all problems—however psychologically deep-rooted—can be overcome." Another staff writer labeled Thompson's performance as her best since Sense and Sensibility, and stated that "she makes the Australian-born British transplant a curmudgeonly delight." Peter Bradshaw of The Guardian enjoyed Hanks's role as Disney, suggesting that, despite its brevity, the film would have been largely "bland" without it.

Geoffrey Macnab of The Independent gave the film a mixed review, writing: "On the one hand, Saving Mr. Banks (which was developed by BBC Films and has a British producer) is a probing, insightful character study with a very dark undertow. On the other, it is a cheery, upbeat marketing exercise in which the Disney organization is re-promoting one of its most popular film characters." Mick LaSalle of the San Francisco Chronicle concluded that if the film "were 100 percent false and yet felt true, that would be fine. But this has the self-conscious whiff, if not of mendacity, then of public relations." American history lecturer John Wills praised the film's attention to detail, such as the inclusion of Travers's original recordings, but doubted that the interpersonal relations between Travers and Disney were as amicable as portrayed in the film. Landon Palmer of Film School Rejects also described several moments where the film had a "shrewd consumption of [the company's] own criticisms", only to later negate them and Disney-fy Travers as a character.

=== Accolades ===
Saving Mr. Banks was nominated for awards and earned accolades from various organizations. The film was nominated in five categories at the 67th British Academy Film Awards: Best British Film, Best Actress in a Leading Role for Emma Thompson, Outstanding Debut by a British Writer, Director or Producer, Best Film Music, and Best Costume Design.

Several American film critics and pundits predicted that the film would be nominated for the Academy Award for Best Picture, and Thompson would be nominated for Best Actress; Disney heavily lobbied the film as such for its awards campaign. However, at the 86th Academy Awards, the film received only one nomination, for Best Original Score, which it did not win. The film also received single nominations at the 71st Golden Globe Awards and 20th Screen Actors Guild Awards, where Thompson was nominated for Best Actress in a Motion Picture – Drama and Outstanding Performance by a Female Actor in a Leading Role, respectively. Additionally, Thompson won both the Empire Award for Best Actress and the National Board of Review Award for Best Actress for her performance, while the film itself was selected by the National Board of Review as one of the year's top 10 films. Saving Mr. Banks was named by the American Film Institute as one of the top 10 films of 2013.
