= Geyer (disambiguation) =

Geyer is a town in Saxony, Germany.

Geyer may also refer to:

- Geyer (surname)
- Geyer, Indonesia, a subdistrict in Grobogan Regency, Central Java, Indonesia
- 8th SS Cavalry Division Florian Geyer, a Waffen-SS cavalry Division during World War II
- Geyer Act, an act of the Missouri State Legislature
- Geyer Willow, a species of willow
- Geyer's sedge, a species of sedge
- Geyer's whorl snail, a species of snail

== See also ==
- Gayer
- Geier (disambiguation)
- Geijer
