= Gajary =

Gajary Gajar
- Municipality
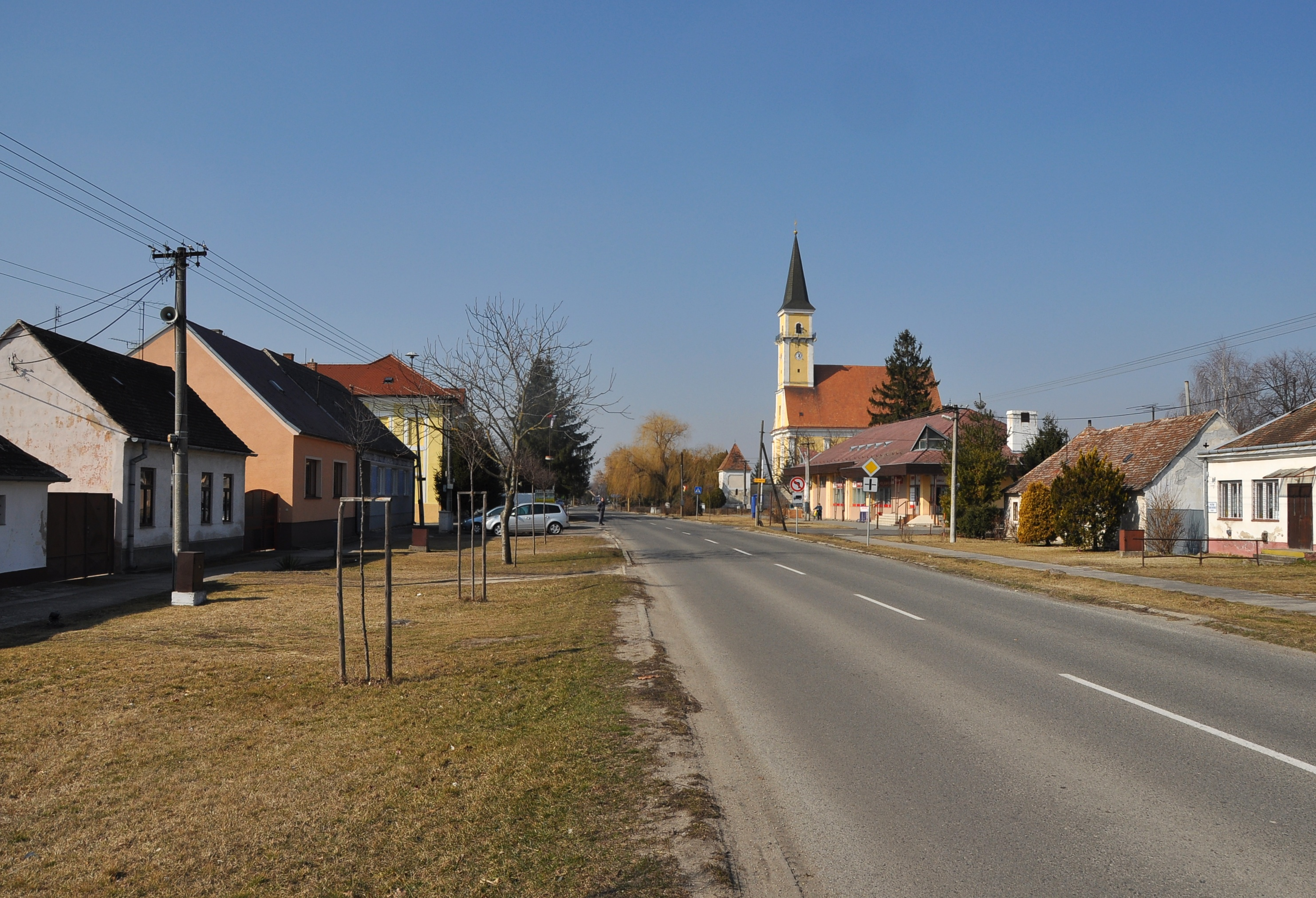
- Main street with the church

- Flag

- Location of Gajary in the Bratislava Region Location of Gajary in Slovakia
- Coordinates: 48.47°N 16.92°E
- Country: Slovakia
- Region: Bratislava Region
- District: Malacky District
- First mentioned: 1373

Area
  - Total: 50.87 km^{2} (19.64 sq mi)
- Elevation: 150 m (490 ft)

Population (2025)
  - Total: 3,221
- Time zone: UTC+1 (CET)
  - Summer (DST): UTC+2 (CEST)
- Postal code: 900 61
- Area code: +421 34
- Vehicle registration plate (until 2022): MA
- Website: www.gajary.sk

Gajary (German: Gayring; Hungarian: Gajar) is a village and municipality in western Slovakia close to the town of Malacky in the Bratislava region. It lies around 40 km (25 statute miles) north-west of Slovakia's capital Bratislava close to the Austrian border. The village has around 3500 inhabitants.

The village is an important archaeological site: findings from the Neolithic period, Eneolithic period, Bronze Age, early Slavic period (several Slavic settlements) have been excavated there.

== Geography ==
The municipality lies at an altitude of 150 metres (490 ft) and covers an area of 50.87 km^{2} (19.64 sq mi) (2025).

== Names and etymology ==
The Slovak name Gajary (1460 Gayary) comes from German personal name Geier (1337 Gaywar, later German name was Gairing). In the 14th century, the village had also the Hungarian name Öregház (Old House, 1377 Eureghaz), but the name was forgotten and then they used the name of German origin Gajár.

== Population ==
Population statistic (10 years)
Year	1995	2005	2015	2025
Count	2499	2859	2985	3221
Difference		+14.40%	+4.40%	+7.90%

Population statistic
Year	2024	2025
Count	3215	3221
Difference		+0.18%

It has a population of 3221 people (31 December 2025).

=== Ethnicity ===
Census 2021 (1+ %)
Ethnicity	Number	Fraction
Slovak	2735	86.46%
Not found out	371	11.72%
Romanian	40	1.26%
Romani	37	1.16%
Total	3163	

In year 2021 was 3163 people by ethnicity 2735 as Slovak, 371 as Not found out, 40 as Romanian, 37 as Romani, 28 as Czech, 7 as Other, 5 as Hungarian, 3 as Vietnamese, 2 as Polish, 2 as Moravian, 1 as Turkish, 1 as Serbian, 1 as Rusyn, 1 as Russian, 1 as Austrian, 1 as German and 1 as Croatian.

Note on population: The difference values of population numbers in the table "Population statistic" and in the sections "Ethnicity" & "Religion" is caused by the use of various statistical methods.

=== Religion ===
Census 2021 (1+ %)
Religion	Number	Fraction
Roman Catholic Church	1840	58.17%
None	838	26.49%
Not found out	365	11.54%
Evangelical Church	32	1.01%
Total	3163	

In year 2021 was 3163 people by religion 1840 from Roman Catholic Church, 838 from None, 365 from Not found out, 32 from Evangelical Church, 27 from Christian Congregations in Slovakia, 20 from Greek Catholic Church, 7 from Eastern Orthodox Church, 6 from Other and not ascertained christian church, 5 from Ad hoc movements, 4 from Other, 3 from Calvinist Church, 3 from Paganism and natural spirituality, 3 from United Methodist Church, 3 from Buddhism, 3 from Apostolic Church, 1 from Jehovah's Witnesses, 1 from Islam, 1 from Church of Jesus Christ of Latter-day Saints and 1 from Baptists Church.

== Genealogical resources ==
The records for genealogical research are available at the state archive "Statny Archiv in Bratislava, Slovakia"

- Roman Catholic church records (births/marriages/deaths): 1657-1895 (parish A)

== See also ==
- List of municipalities and towns in Slovakia
