= Ronan Vibert =

British actor (1964–2022)

- Born: Ronan David Jackson Vibert; 23 February 1964; Cambridgeshire, England
- Died: 22 December 2022 (aged 58); Miami, Florida, U.S.
- Occupation: Actor
- Years active: 1987–2019
- Spouse: Jess Grand

Ronan David Jackson Vibert (23 February 1964 – 22 December 2022) was an English actor who was known for his appearances in films and on British and American television.

== Early life ==
He was born in Cambridge, on 23 February 1964, the son of Dilys (née Jackson) and David Vibert, both artists and brother Cevn Vibert. He lived in Penarth, South Wales, until he was 18, then attended the Royal Academy of Dramatic Art (RADA), graduating in 1985.

== Career ==
Vibert had a long career in theatre, radio, television and film.

Vibert appeared in episodes of Lovejoy, Chandler & Co, Between the Lines and the BBC's The Buccaneers, in ITV's Cadfael, Inspector Lewis and in Van der Valk. He appeared in Jeeves and Wooster as Wilmot, Lord Pershore ('Motty').

Stage credits included plays at the Bush Theatre, Hampstead Theatre, The Gate, Manchester Royal Exchange, Bristol Old Vic, The Barbican for the RSC, The Almeida and The Savoy West End. In 1996, Vibert appeared at the National Theatre for the third time, as Prince Andre in Helen Edmundson's adaptation of Leo Tolstoy's War and Peace. He played Maximilien Robespierre in the BBC's adaptation of The Scarlet Pimpernel with Richard E. Grant.

Vibert appeared in the Midsomer Murders episode "Death in Chorus". He also appeared in episodes of Waking The Dead and The Mrs Bradley Mysteries.

He also appeared in such TV series as Rome, ITV's Poirot, The Borgias, Emmy award winning miniseries Hatfields and McCoys with Kevin Costner and Bill Paxton, Penny Dreadful, The Lizzie Borden Chronicles, NCIS LA, Philip K. Dick's Electric Dreams and Carnival Row.

Among his many films are Shadow of the Vampire with John Malkovich and Willem Dafoe, The Cat's Meow directed by Peter Bogdanovich, the Oscar-winning The Pianist directed by Roman Polanski, Tomb Raider 2, Tristan and Isolde, The Snowman with Michael Fassbender and Saving Mr Banks with Tom Hanks and Emma Thompson, portraying the literary agent Diarmuid Russell. He also appeared in The Grass Arena with Mark Rylance.

== Illness and death ==
Vibert died at a Florida hospital on 22 December 2022, aged 58, following a brief illness.

== Filmography ==
=== Film and television ===
Year	Title	Role	Notes
1987	On the Black Hill	Jim Watkins	Rowing with the Wind 1988
1989	Traffik	Lee	
1990	Birds of a Feather	Martin	Episode: "Love on the Run"
1991	Van der Valk	Martin Lepweg	Episode: "Dangerous Games"
1992	Jeeves and Wooster	Wilmot, Lord Pershore ('Motty')	"Bertie Sets Sail"
1993	Lovejoy	Lindsey Parry Davies	"Second Fiddle"
1995	Cadfael	Le Gaucher	Episode: "The Virgin in the Ice"
1995	The Buccaneers	Lord Richard Marabel	
1996	Tales from the Crypt		Episode: "Horror in the Night"
1998	Tale of the Mummy	Young	
1998	Big Women	Bull	
1999	Gimme Gimme Gimme	Vince	Episode: "I Do, I Do, I Do"
1999	Highlander: The Raven	Sir Trevor Benton	"The Frame"
1999–2000	The Scarlet Pimpernel	Maximilien Robespierre	
2000	The Mrs Bradley Mysteries	Douglas	Episode: "Laurels Are Poison"
2000	Shadow of the Vampire	Muller	
2001	The Cat's Meow	Joseph Willicombe	
2002	Shearing	Stewart	short film
2002	The Pianist	Janina's Husband	
2002	The Princess and the Pea	Laird	
2003	Keen Eddie	Craig Booth	"The Amazing Larry Dunn"
2003	Lara Croft Tomb Raider: The Cradle of Life	MI6 Agent Calloway	
2004	London	Joseph Conrad	
2004	Gladiatress	Caesar	
2005	Hex	Mephistopheles	
2005	Waking The Dead	Dr Jonathan Lynch	"Subterraneans"
2006	Ultimate Force	Griffin	"Violent Solutions"
2006	Midsomer Murders	Giles Armitage	"Death in Chorus"
2007	Taggart	James Forsyth	Episode: "Users and Losers"
2007	Rome	Lepidus	Episode: "Philippi"
2008	The Sarah Jane Adventures	Professor Skinner	The Last Sontaran
2009	The Bill	Curtis Jensen	
2009	Lewis	Simon Monkford	"The Quality of Mercy"
2010	The Last Seven	Isaac	
2010	Agatha Christie's Poirot	Captain Dacres	"Three Act Tragedy"
2010	1066	Sweyn	
2011	The Borgias	Giovanni Sforza	
2011	The Man Who Crossed Hitler	Walther Stennes	
2012	Hatfields & McCoys	Perry Cline	
2013	Saving Mr. Banks	Diarmuid Russell	
2013	New Tricks	Ray Barlow	"Roots"
2014	Dracula Untold	Simion "The Wise"	
2015	Jonathan Strange & Mr Norrell	The Duke of Wellington	
2015	Penny Dreadful	Sir Geoffrey Hawkes	Episodes: "The Nightcomers", "Little Scorpion"
2015	The Coroner	Gavin Drake	Episode: "That's the Way to Do It"
2017	The Snowman	DCI Gunnar Hagen	
2017	Philip K. Dick's Electric Dreams	Chief Judge	Episode: "Human Is"
2018	The Alienist	Charles Murray	Episode: "Requiem"
2019	Carnival Row	Ritter Longerbane	Episodes: "Some Dark God Wakes", "The Joining of Unlike Things"

=== Radio ===
Year	Play	Role	Notes
2008	A Dance to the Music of Time	Peter Templer	BBC Radio 4
