= Auchter =

Auchter may refer to:

- Amanda Auchter, American writer and educator
- George D. Auchter, Florida construction engineer
- Thorne G. Auchter, American former OSHA director
- The Auchter Company, construction contractor in Jacksonville, Florida
