= Geier =

Geier may refer to:

- Geier (surname), a surname of German origin (includes a list)
- The Geier Indians, 17th century Native American group

== Places ==
- Mount Geier, Antarctica
- Geier (Tux Alps), Austria

== Fiction ==
- Der Geier (in English The Vulture), a short story by Franz Kafka
- Marcus Geier, a character in the television show Bones

== Naval ==
- Geier (freighter), 1916–1917, a British freighter captured by German navy
- SMS Geier, a German cruiser
- Geier (patrol boat), a German patrol boat
- The FRG Geier, a ship decommissioned in 1976, sold to Greece, and renamed Tyfon
- Geier, the nickname for an experimental German World War II torpedo

== See also ==
- Gayer
- Geyer (disambiguation)
- Geijer
