= Geyer (surname) =

Geyer is a German surname meaning "vulture". Notable people with the surname include:

- Andrea Geyer (born 1971), German-American artist
- Bernadette Geyer (1968), American writer
- Bill Geyer (1919–2004), American football player
- Carl Geyer (1796–1841), German entomologist
- Celesta Geyer (1901–1982), American circus artist
- Dean Geyer (born 1986), Australian singer and actor
- David Geyer (1855–1932), German malacologist
- Eduard Geyer (born 1944), German football manager
- Erich Geyer (born 1950), German football player
- Florian Geyer (1490–1525), German folk hero
- Forest Geyer (1892–1932), American football player
- Georgie Anne Geyer (1935–2019), American journalist and columnist
- Henry S. Geyer (1790–1859), American politician, lawyer, and soldier
- Hermann Geyer (1882–1946), German general
- John Geyer (1777–1835), American politician from Philadelphia
- Karl Andreas Geyer (1809–1853), German botanist
- Lee E. Geyer (1888–1941), American politician
- Ludwig Geyer (1779–1821), German actor, playwright and painter, stepfather of Richard Wagner
- Ludwig Geyer (cyclist) (1904–1992), German cyclist
- Manfred Geyer (1951), German biathlete
- Mark Geyer (born 1967), Australian rugby player
- Matt Geyer (born 1975), Australian rugby player
- Peter Geyer (born 1952), German football player
- Renée Geyer (1953–2023), Australian singer
- Stefi Geyer (1888–1956), Hungarian violinist
- Stephen Geyer (born 1950), American songwriter

== See also ==
- Geyer (disambiguation)
