= Rosemary Winslow =

American poet, and academic

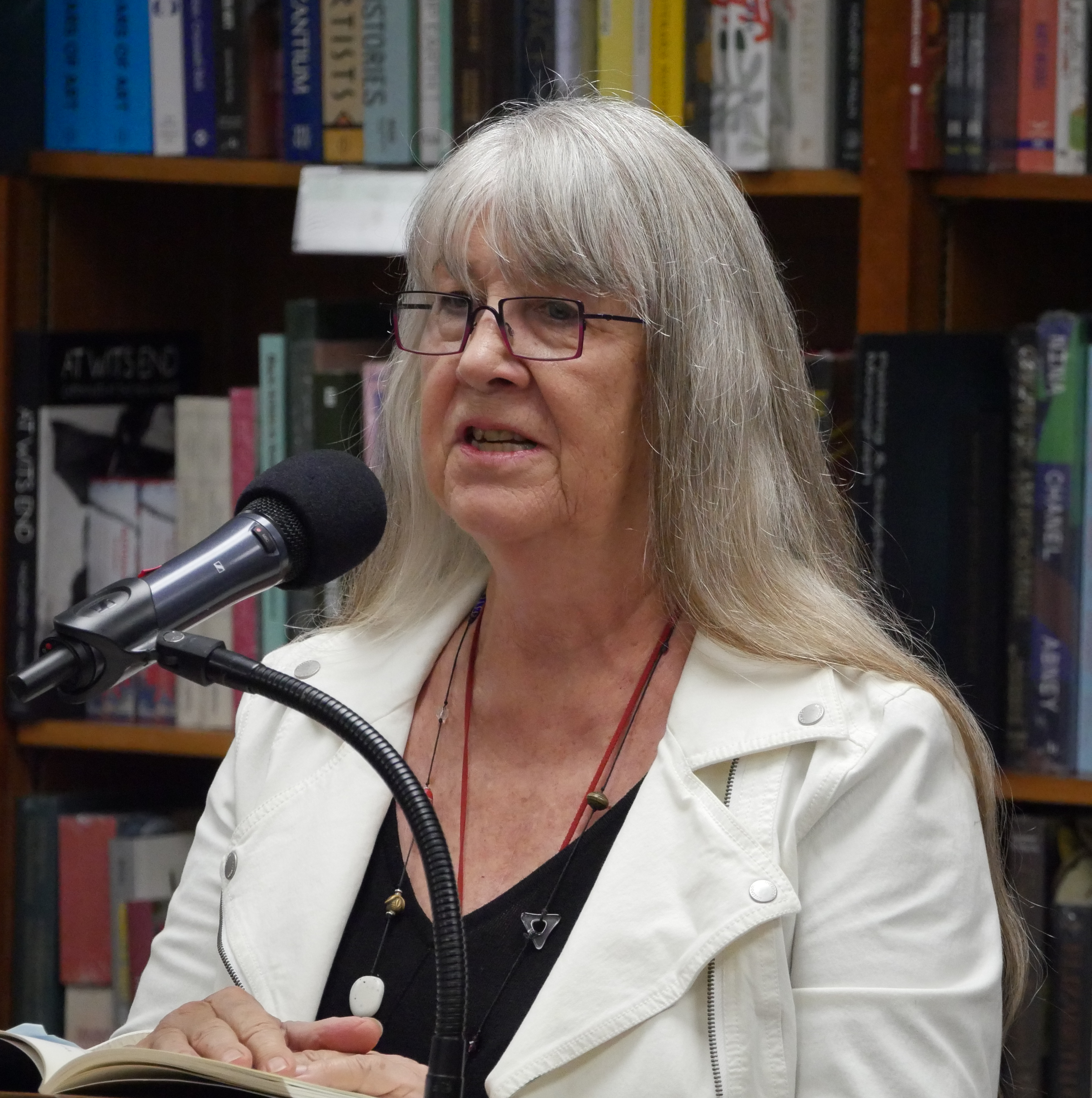
- Occupation: Poet

Academic work
- Institutions: Catholic University of America School of Arts and Sciences

Rosemary Winslow is an American poet and academic.

== Life ==
Rosemary Winslow lives in Washington, D.C., with her husband John, a visual artist. She teaches at The Catholic University of America.

Her work has appeared in 32 poems, Poet Lore, The Southern Review, Crux. She published a collection of poems in 2007 entitled Greenbodies.

Her articles on Whitman have included the influence of Egyptology on his work, and Whitman's prosodic practice and influence on the Modernists. She is a co-director of the Joaquin Miller Cabin Poetry Series.

== Awards ==
She has received the Larry Neal Award for Poetry twice and Writer's Fellowships from the DC Commission for the Arts and The Vermont Studio Center.

== Works ==
- "Foxes", Beltway Poetry Quarterly, Winter 2004
- "Linden"; "Going Home"; "White Ground"; "Backyard"; "5 A.M.", Beltway Poetry Quarterly, Winter 2006
- "To A Fish", The Innisfree Poetry Journal
- "Blood/Wine"; "The Day"; "Mother, Then & Now"; "Beslan, et Alia", The Innisfree Poetry Journal
- "Haifa Street, Baghdad"; "Hydrangeas"; "Just In"; "The Visit"; "She Was Embroidered and Spring Kept Knocking", Locus Point, 31 October 2008
- Green bodies. Word Works. 2007. ISBN 978-0-915380-67-1.

=== Anthology ===
- Sarah Browning; Michele Elliott; Danny Rose (eds.). D.C. Poets Against the War. The Argonne House Press.

=== Non-fiction ===
- William A. Barbieri; Robert R. Magliola; Rosemary Winslow, eds. (2004). Civil society: who belongs?. CRVP. ISBN 978-1-56518-197-7.
- Ronald A. Sudol; Alice S. Horning, eds. (1999). "Poetry, Community, and the Vision of Hospitality". The literacy connection. Hampton Press. ISBN 978-1-57273-216-2.

== Reviews ==
In this, her first full-length collection, Rosemary Winslow weaves a web of both darkness and light, terror and joy, violence and loss, trauma and redemption, using filaments that are delicate, yet have enormous tensile strength. She writes about growing up in a painfully difficult family, giving us lessons on how to love the unlovable in poem after poem that express "the terrible complexity of love." (Baron Wormser) Lyric and meditative, these poems bear witness to an almost unbearable family history, in a small quiet voice that never preaches, but speaks of love and forgiveness of that which is truly unforgivable.
