= Geijer =

Geijer is a Swedish surname. People with this surname include:

- Agnes Geijer (1898–1989), Swedish historian and archaeologist
- Agneta Geijer (1950–1972); Swedish painter and draughtsperson
- Arne Geijer (1910–1979), trade unionist
- Erik Gustaf Geijer (1783–1847), writer, composer, and historian
- Eric Neville Geijer (1894–1941), herald and genealogist
- Lennart Geijer (1909–1999), Minister for Justice
- Mona Geijer-Falkner (1887–1973), film actress
- Reinhold Geijer (born 1953), banker
- Geijer family, Swedish noble family of Austrian origin

== See also ==
- C. Geijer & Co, Norwegian company founded in 1869 and sold in 1989
- Gayer
- Geier (disambiguation)
- Geyer (disambiguation)
