= Lisa Russ Spaar =

American poet

- Occupations: Poet, Essayist, & Novelist Professor at University of Virginia
- Writing career
- Notable awards: Guggenheim Fellowship, Rona Jaffe Award for Emerging Women Writers
- Website: https://lisarussspaar.com/

Lisa Russ Spaar is a contemporary American poet, professor, and essayist. She is currently a professor of English and Creative Writing at the University of Virginia and the founder of the Area Program in Poetry Writing. She is the author of numerous books of poetry, most recently Orexia and Madrigalia: New & Selected Poems. Her latest collection, Soul Cake, was published by Persea Books in 2026. Her poem, “Temple Gaudete”, published in IMAGE Journal, won a 2016 Pushcart Prize.

She is also the author of the novel Paradise Close (2022), as well as works of poetry criticism and anthologies, including All That Mighty Heart: London Poems, which Billy Collins says "gathers [a] mighty swirl of poetry into a gorgeous volume whose variety and heft rival the city itself— its smoke, roar, and flow."

Spaar's work has appeared in publications including The New Yorker, The Paris Review, Poetry, The Kenyon Review, The Yale Review, Harvard Review, Ploughshares, Virginia Quarterly Review, and The New York Times.

== Education ==
Spaar studied English Language and Literature at the University of Virginia, graduating in 1978 with High Distinction and summa cum laude honors. She subsequently earned an M.F.A. in Creative Writing, with a concentration in poetry, from the University of Virginia in 1982.

Her early teaching appointments included positions at James Madison University and the University of North Texas before she returned to the University of Virginia.

== Career ==
Spaar's literary career encompasses poetry, fiction, essays, criticism, editing, and teaching. Her poetry is characterized by an extensive engagement with literary and cultural traditions, formal experimentation, and recurring attention to subjects including desire, embodiment, spirituality, nature, memory, illness, art, and the passage of time.

Beginning in the 1990s, Spaar became increasingly prominent as a teacher and administrator in the University of Virginia's creative-writing program. She directed the university's M.F.A. Program in Creative Writing from 1995 to 2006 and then again from 2018–2021. In 2000, she founded the UVA’s Area Program in Poetry Writing, which she also directed until 2022. Now called the Poetry Concentration, this is a selective, two-year undergraduate writing program for English Majors.

She received a Guggenheim Fellowship in 2009, and in addition to her work at UVA, she has served as a visiting poet and professor at other institutions. She was the Beall Distinguished Visiting Professor in Poetry at Baylor University from 2018 to 2022.

== Poetry ==
Spaar's first chapbook, Cellar, appeared in 1983, followed by Blind Boy on Skates in 1989. She won the Rona Jaffe Award for Emerging Women Writers in 2000 for her first full-length poetry collection, Glass Town.

Her subsequent collections include:

- Glass Town (Red Hen Press, 1999)
- Blue Venus (Persea Books, 2004)
- Satin Cash (Persea Books, 2008)
- Vanitas, Rough (Persea Books, 2012)
- Orexia (Persea Books, 2017)
- Madrigalia: New & Selected Poems (Persea Books, 2021)
- Soul Cake (Persea Books, 2026)

Spaar's poems have appeared in The New Yorker, The Paris Review, Poetry, The Kenyon Review, IMAGE Journal, The Yale Review, Ploughshares, Virginia Quarterly Review, The Missouri Review, The Boston Review, Shenandoah, Blackbird, and numerous other journals and anthologies.

Her poems have also been selected for venues including the Academy of American Poets' Poem-a-Day series, the cocktail menu at Trick Dog in San Francisco, Best American Poetry (2008), and have been reprinted in The Pushcart Prize anthology.

== Prose ==
Spaar expanded into fiction with Paradise Close, her debut novel, published in 2022. A paperback edition followed in 2025.

The novel received reviews and coverage from publications including Library Journal, Foreword Reviews, The Adroit Journal, The Southeast Review, The Los Angeles Review of Books, The Pittsburgh Post-Gazette, and The Seawall. Spaar discussed the experience of publishing her first novel in her sixties in an essay for Literary Hub.

Spaar has also published short fiction and personal literary essays in ISLE, The Yale Review, The American Scholar, The Hedgehog Review, Literary Imagination, Literary Matters, Longreads, The New York Times, and Big Other.

== Anthologies ==
Spaar has edited or introduced several significant anthologies and collections, including:

- Acquainted with the Night: Insomnia Poems (Columbia University Press, 1999)
- All That Mighty Heart: London Poems (University of Virginia Press, 2008)
- Monticello in Mind: Fifty Contemporary Poems on Jefferson (University of Virginia Press, 2016)
- More Truly & More Strange: 100 Contemporary American Self-Portrait Poems (Persea Books, 2020)
- The Hide-and-Seek Muse: Annotations of Contemporary Poetry (Drunken Boat, 2013)

== Literary Criticism ==
Currently, Spaar writes a series of articles entitled "Second Acts: A Second Look at Second Books of Poetry," originally published through the Los Angeles Review of Books and now housed at Adroit Journal. The series examines second books by poets from different generations and literary traditions, placing contemporary poetry in conversation with earlier work. Her articles have considered poets including Louise Glück, Robert Hass, Galway Kinnell, Susan Howe, Rae Armantrout, Amy Clampitt, Carl Phillips, Charles Simic, Jean Valentine, Linda Gregerson, and others.

Spaar has contributed more than 70 articles to the Chronicle of Higher Education, including the Monday's Poem series and the Spaar on Poetry series.

Spaar has written reviews and critical essays for publications including the Los Angeles Review of Books, Virginia Quarterly Review, The New York Times Book Review, The Washington Post Book World, The Boston Review, On the Seawall, 32 Poems, and more.

In 2015 she was a finalist for the National Book Critics Circle Award for Excellence in Reviewing, recognizing her work as a literary critic.

== Teaching ==
Spaar has received numerous teaching honors and awards.

She directed the M.F.A. Program in Creative Writing at the University of Virginia from 1995 to 2006 and again from 2018 to 2021, with an interim appointment in 2022. She founded and directed UVA's Area Program in Poetry Writing from 2000 through 2022 and subsequently served as interim director.

Her teaching has been recognized through several major honors, including the Horace W. Goldsmith NEH Distinguished Teaching Professorship, a national finalist position for the Cherry Award for Excellence in Teaching, an award for teaching excellence from the State Council for Higher Education in Virginia, an All-University Teaching Award, and the Edward L. Ayers Faculty Fellowship in Advising.

== Awards ==
Spaar's awards and distinctions include:

- 2027 A Director's Invitee to Castle Civitella Ranieri
- 2025 Lamont Visiting Poet, Phillips Exeter Academy
- 2023 Distinguished Scholar Award, University of Virginia Office of University Engagement and Office of the Provost
- 2018–2022 Beall Distinguished Visiting Professor in Poetry, Baylor University
- 2018 Shortlisted as one of three finalists for Poet Laureate of Virginia
- 2016–2018 Horace W. Goldsmith NEH Distinguished Teaching Professorship
- 2016–2017 Inaugural Arts Fellow, University of Virginia College of Arts & Sciences
- 2016 Pushcart Prize for Poetry
- 2015–2016 Virginia Foundation for the Humanities Fellowship
- 2015 National finalist, Cherry Award for Excellence in Teaching
- 2015 Finalist, National Book Critics Circle Award for Excellence in Reviewing
- 2013–2015 Jefferson Scholars Foundation Faculty Prize
- 2011 Carole Weinstein Poetry Award
- 2010–2013 Edward L. Ayers Faculty Fellow in Advising
- 2009–2011 John Simon Guggenheim Memorial Foundation Fellowship in Poetry
- 2009 Library of Virginia Literary Award for Poetry
- 2000 Rona Jaffe Award for Emerging Women Writers
- 1997 Finalist, National Poetry Series
- 1996 Virginia Commission for the Arts Individual Artists Award
- 1978 Academy of American Poets Prize - University of Virginia
- 1980 Hoyns Fellowship in Poetry - University of Virginia

== Selected reviews and critical reception ==
Vanitas, Rough was named by Library Journal among its Thirty Essential Poetry Titles for 2013.

“Hibernalphilia” was named one of the top 20 poems of 2013 by the Boston Review.

Orexia received a starred review from Library Journal and was named among the Academy of American Poets' top 20 poetry books of 2017.

Acquainted with the Night was named by The Guardian among its top ten books about insomnia in 2019.

More Truly & More Strange was selected by The Millions as a "Must Read" poetry book in 2020.

Madrigalia: New & Selected Poems was named by Library Journal among its poetry titles to watch in 2021.

Paradise Close was included on Literary Hub's list of its most anticipated books of 2022.

Soul Cake was featured by Literary Hub as one of "Seven New Books to Read in May" in 2026.
