= Gayer =

Gayer or Gáyer is a surname. Notable people with the name include:

- Catherine Gayer (born 1937), American singer opera soprano
- Diane Gayer (born 1952), American architect
- Edward Gayer Andrews (1825–1907), American Bishop
- Gustavo Gayer (born 1981), Brazilian businessman and politician
- Gyula Gáyer (1883–1932), Hungarian botanist
- Henrietta Gayer (died 1814), Irish Methodist leader
- John Gayer (died 1711) (died 1711), British colonial administrator
- John Gayer (Lord Mayor of London) (1584–1649), English merchant
- John Gayer (MP), 16th-century English politician
- Karin Gayer (born 1969), Austrian writer
- Lora Lee Gayer (born 1988), American stage actress
- Maria da Conceição Gayer (1949–2006), Brazilian politician and lawyer
- Ted Gayer (born 1970), American economist
- Wolfgang Gayer (born 1943), German footballer

== See also ==
- Geier (surname)
- Geijer
- Geyer (surname)
