= Gregory Fraser =

American poet

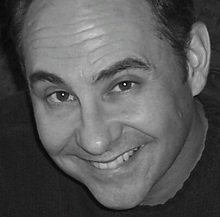
- Occupations: Professor of English and Creative Writing.
- Employer: University of West Georgia

Gregory Fraser is an American poet.

== Biography ==
Gregory Fraser is an American poet, editor, and professor. He is the author of four poetry collections: Strange Pietà, Answering the Ruins, Designed for Flight, and Little Armageddon. He is also the co-author, with poet Chad Davidson, of two college textbooks, Writing Poetry and Analyze Anything, and the co-editor, with Susannah Mintz, of Placing Disability: Personal Essays of Embodied Geography. Fraser grew up in Philadelphia and its suburbs, and earned a B.A. at Ursinus College, an M.F.A. at Columbia University, and a Ph.D. at the University of Houston. His poetry has appeared in such journals as The New Yorker, The Paris Review, The Southern Review, The Gettysburg Review, and Ploughshares. The recipient of grants from the Guggenheim Foundation and the National Endowment for the Arts, Fraser teaches at the University of West Georgia, located an hour west of Atlanta, and serves as features editor of the Birmingham Poetry Review. He also writes songs with the folk-rock group Ties That Bind, featuring Anthony and Brittney Baxter, and plays drums for the Americana band Adamson Avenue, fronted by Jason Kesler.

== Awards ==
- 2017 Meringoff Prize in Poetry (Association of Literary Scholars, Critics, and Writers)
- 2016 James Dickey Poetry Prize (Five Points literary magazine)
- 2015 John Simon Guggenheim Memorial Foundation Fellowship
- 2010 Georgia Author of the Year in Poetry
- 2009 Sewanee Writers’ Conference Fellowship
- 2005 National Endowment for the Arts Fellowship
- Texas Teachers of Creative Writing Award
- Walt McDonald First Book Award
- Associated Writing Programs Award
- Houston Arts Council Literary Award

== Bibliography ==
=== Poetry ===
Collections

- Little Armageddon. Northwestern University Press. 2020. ISBN 978-0-8101-4310-4.
- Designed for Flight. TriQuarterly Books/Northwestern University Press. 2014.
- Answering the Ruins
- Strange Pietà

List of poems

| Title | Year | First published | Reprinted/collected |
|---|---|---|---|
| Business | 2019 | "Business". The New Yorker. 95 (14): 43. May 27, 2019. | |
| Miscarriage | 2026 | https://poets.org/poem/miscarriage-1 | |

=== Non-fiction ===
- Placing Disability: Personal Essays of Embodied Geography, anthology (with Susannah Mintz)
- Analyze Anything: A Guide to Critical Reading and Writing, textbook (with Chad Davidson)
- Writing Poetry: Creative-Critical Approaches, textbook (with Chad Davidson)

== Online Works and Reviews ==
- Review of Designed for Flight by Shawn Delgado
- Review of Designed for Flight by Lauren Watel
- “The Great Northeast,” The Missouri Review
- “End of Days,” Verse Daily/The Southern Review
- “Ficus,” Verse Daily/Birmingham Poetry Review
- “Epithalamium,” Verse Daily/New South
- Review of Answering the Ruins
- A Different Bother (chapbook), Beard of Bees Press
- Interview with Gregory Fraser
- Review of Strange Pietà
- Interview with Gregory Fraser
