= Chad Davidson =

American poet and translator (born 1970)

- Born: 1970 (age 55–56); Southern California, U.S.
- Education: California State University, San Bernardino (BA); University of North Texas (MA); Binghamton University (PhD)
- Occupations: Poet; translator

Chad Davidson (born 1970 in Southern California) is an American poet and translator.

== Biography ==
Chad Davidson holds a BA, MA, and PhD in English from California State University, San Bernardino, the University of North Texas, and Binghamton University, respectively. He is currently Associate Professor of English at the University of West Georgia. His poems and articles have appeared in AGNI, Colorado Review, Hotel Amerika, The Paris Review, Prairie Schooner, Shenandoah, Virginia Quarterly Review, The Writer's Chronicle, and elsewhere.

== Awards ==
- Crab Orchard Prize in Poetry

== Publications ==
=== Poetry collections ===
- From the Fire Hills. Southern Illinois University Press. 2014.
- The Last Predicta. Southern Illinois University Press. 2008. ISBN 978-0-8093-2875-8.
- Chad Davidson and John Poch. Hockey Haiku: The Essential Collection. St. Martin's Press. 2006. ISBN 978-0-312-35607-1.
- Consolation Miracle. Southern Illinois University Press. 2003. ISBN 978-0-8093-2541-2. "Chad Davidson."

=== Non-Fiction ===
- Chad Davidson and Gregory Fraser. Analyze Anything: A Guide to Critical Reading and Writing. Continuum. 2012. ISBN 978-1-4411-0730-5.
- Chad Davidson and Gregory Fraser. Writing Poetry: Creative and Critical Approaches to Writing. Palgrave Macmillan. 2009. ISBN 978-0-230-00812-0.
- Graeme Harper, ed. (2006). "Poetry". Teaching creative writing. Continuum International Publishing Group. ISBN 978-0-8264-7726-2.

=== Anthologies ===
- William J. Walsh, ed. (2006). "Cleopatra's Bra". Under the rock umbrella: contemporary American poets, 1951-1977. Mercer University Press. ISBN 978-0-88146-047-6.

== Online Works ==
- "Cockroaches: Ars Poetica", poets.org
- "Consolation Miracle", poets.org
- "The Match", poets.org
- "The Pear", poets.org
- "This is the Cow", poets.org
- "Encryption", Tarpaulin Sky, Winter 2002
- "HOCKEY HAIKU x 10", Diagram 5.1, Chad Davidson and John Poch
- "Labor Days", Ploughshares, Spring 2008
