= Robin Beth Schaer =

American poet (born 1971)

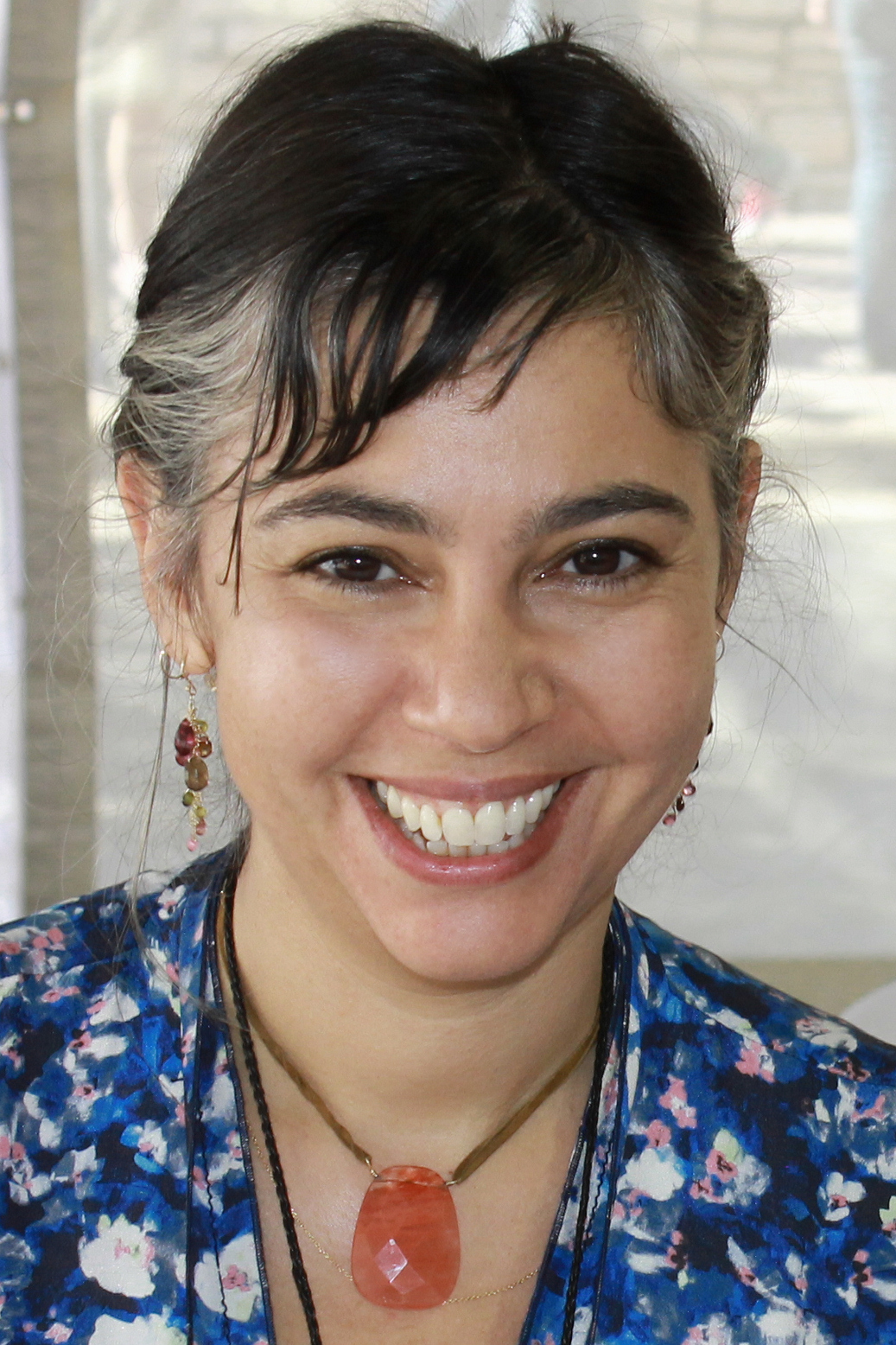
- Schaer at the 2015 Texas Book Festival
- Born: 1971 (age 54–55)
- Occupation: Poet
- Website: www.robinbethschaer.com

Robin Beth Schaer is an American poet.

== Biography ==
Born in 1971, she graduated from Colgate University and Columbia University, and has taught at Columbia University, The New School, Cooper Union, Oberlin College and worked at the Academy of American Poets.

She is the author of one book of poetry, Shipbreaking. Her work has appeared in Rattapallax, Denver Quarterly, Guernica, Painted Bride Quarterly, and Barrow Street, Washington Square.

She currently teaches at Case Western Reserve University and has worked as a deckhand aboard the Bounty, and lived in New York City.

== Awards ==
- Yaddo
- Djerassi Resident Artists Program
- Saltonstall Foundation Fellowship
- Virginia Center for the Creative Arts Fellowship

== Works ==
- Shipbreaking (Anhinga 2015)
- "Falling Overboard", on the loss of HMS Bounty during Hurricane Sandy, "Paris Review", November 2012
- "Flight Distance", "Tornado", and "Wildfire", "The Awl", October 21. 2010
- "Insomnia", Guernica, September 2005
- "Mourning"; "After Mourning", Rattapallax
- "Endangerment Finding", Poems for the First 100 Days, April 22, 2009
- Amphibian. Columbia University. 2005.

=== Anthologies ===
- Rachel Zucker; Arielle Greenberg, eds. (2010). Starting Today: 100 Poems for Obama's First 100 Days. University Of Iowa Press. ISBN 978-1-58729-871-4.
- Natasha Trethewey; Jeb Livingood, eds. (2007). Best New Poets, 2007. Samovar Press. ISBN 978-0-9766296-2-7.
