= Kristopher Kyer =

American actor

- Born: May 9, 1958 (age 68); Muskegon, Michigan, United States
- Occupations: Actor, dialogue coach, acting coach
- Years active: 1990–present

Kristopher Kyer, or Kristopher Antekeier; is an American actor, dialogue coach and acting coach. His career spans more than three decades as an actor, performer, teacher, singer and director in the entertainment industry. For almost two decades in Burbank, he was the director and owner of the Kyer Workshop for Actors. As an actor, Kyer appeared in several commercials, especially as a scarecrow for advertising White Lily cornmeal, which ran for many years.

== Filmography ==
Television
Year	Title	Role	Notes
1990	Quantum Leap	Ringmaster	Guest star (Episode: "Leaping in Without a Net"); credited as Kristopher Antekeier
1993–94	Boy Meets World	TV voice	Guest star (2 episodes)
1993–94	Boy Meets World	Mall announcer	Guest star (Episode: "Model Family")
1999	USA High	Emcee	Guest star (Episode: "The Wedding")

Film
Year	Title	Role	Notes
1991	Trancers II	Train station clerk	Credited as Kristopher Antekeier
1996	The 3 Little Pigs: The Movie	voice	Direct-to-DVD
2013	Saving Mr. Banks	Dick Van Dyke	Uncredited role

List of production credits
Year	Title	Notes
1997–98	Grace Under Fire	Dialogue coach (11 episodes; season 5)
2005	Hostage	Acting coach
