= J.E. Pitts =

American poet (1967–2010)

- Born: James Edward Pitts; December 28, 1967; Corinth, Mississippi, U.S.
- Died: August 19, 2010 (aged 42)
- Education: University of Mississippi
- Occupations: Poet, songwriter, musician, photographer, artist, designer, editor

J. E. Pitts (December 28, 1967 – August 19, 2010) was an American poet, songwriter, musician, photographer, artist, designer, and editor.

== Life ==
J. E. (James Edward) "Jimmy" Pitts was born in and grew up in Corinth, Mississippi. He graduated from the University of Mississippi with a degree in English and history. While at the university he edited and designed the student literary journal, The Yalobusha Review, for three consecutive years. He spent one year after graduation teaching English, American Literature, Grammar, and Speech at a private school in Marshall County, Mississippi.

Jimmy Pitts was a regular contributor to The Local Voice newspaper in Oxford, Mississippi, from 2007 until his death in 2010. He was one of the founding editors of Salt and Vox literary fanzines, and was the "at large" poetry editor for The Oxford American from 2000 to 2010. His work appeared in Arkansas Review, Bellevue Literary Review, Poetry, Southern Poetry Review, among others. His first book of poetry, The Weather of Dreams, was published by David Robert Books, an imprint of Wordtech Communications, of Cincinnati, Ohio, in 2008.

His only formal art training was five years of public school art classes in grades 5–9. He has completed 2,000+ works of art since 1993. The majority of his work is in private collections around The United States. His paintings are owned by musician Marty Stuart and the late film director Robert Altman. His main mediums are oil and acrylic on canvas and wood panels, although he has experimented on window frames, glass, mirrors, ironing boards, and other non traditional surfaces. He produced 300 plus individual works of art per year.

A self-taught musician, his main instrument was the guitar. He also experimented with piano, drums, and bass. His music can be found on Facebook and on Myspace under Jimmy Pitts. He was set to release his debut record in 2010 before his untimely death.

He lived in Oxford, Mississippi.

== Awards ==
- 2006 Literary Arts Fellowship for Poetry from the Mississippi Arts Commission

== Works ==
- The Weather of Dreams. Wordtech Communications. 2007. ISBN 978-1-933456-57-7. (David Robert Books)
