= Deborah Ager =

American poet, essayist, and editor

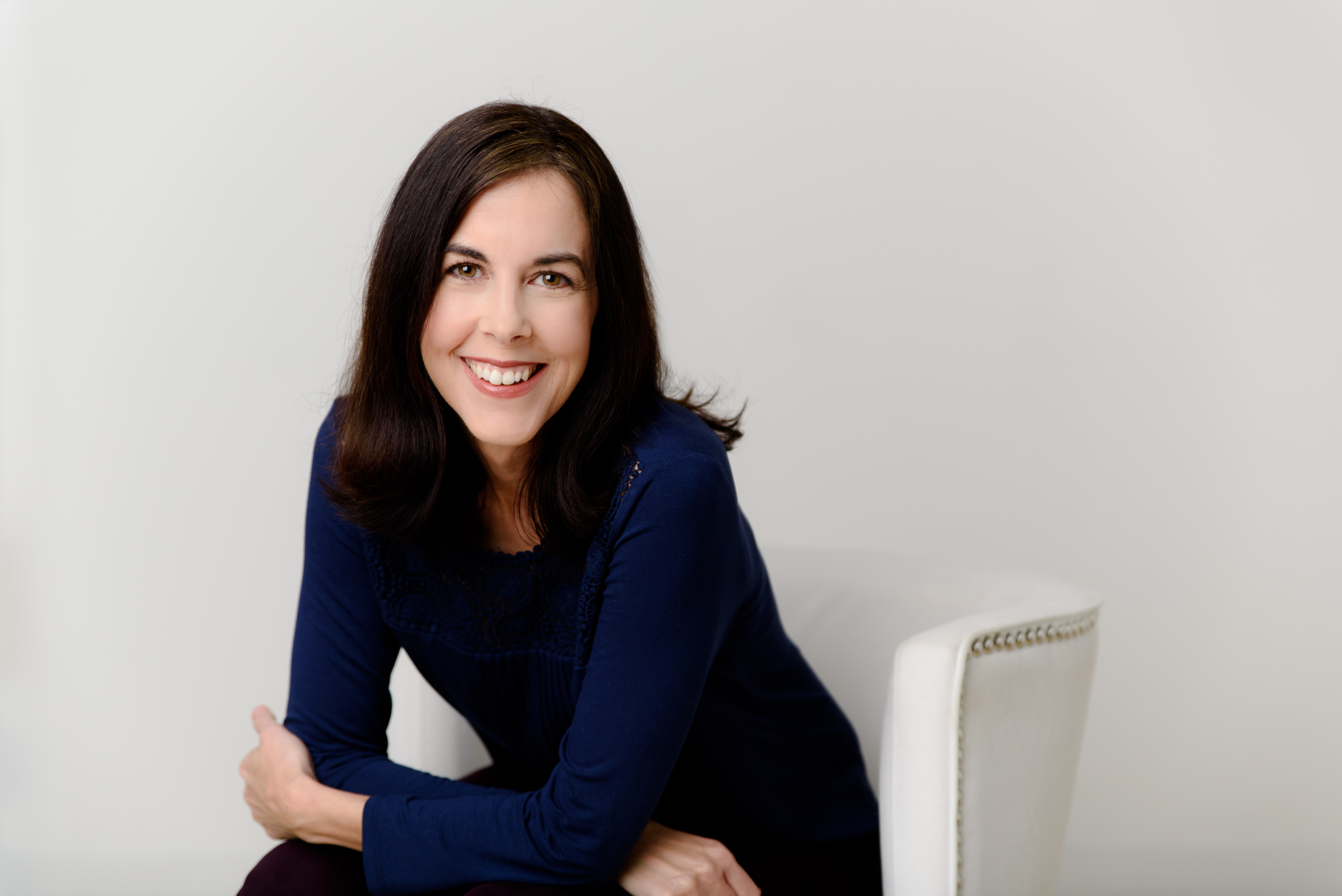
- Born: Bethesda, Maryland, U.S.
- Education: University of Maryland (BA); University of Florida (MFA)
- Occupation: Poet
- Website: www.radiantmedialabs.com

Deborah Ager is an American poet, essayist, and editor.

== Life ==
Deborah Ager founded the poetry magazine known as 32 poems or 32 Poems Magazine in 2003 with the poet John Poch. She was educated at the University of Maryland (B.A.) and the University of Florida (M.F.A.).

She has published three books. Ager co-edited the anthologies Old Flame: 10 Years of 32 Poems Magazine (2012) with John Poch and Bill Beverly and The Bloomsbury Anthology of Contemporary Jewish American Poetry (2013) with M. E. Silverman.

Her writing has appeared in New England Review, The Georgia Review, Birmingham Poetry Review, Los Angeles Review, North American Review, and Best New Poets 2006. Her manuscript Midnight Voices was a semifinalist for the A. Poulin, Jr. Poetry Prize in 2007 before being accepted for publication by Cherry Grove Collections.

Ager is also an essayist, with nonfiction writing published in Narratively, The Week, and Modern Loss. She is CEO of Radiant Media Labs, a company that assists industry professionals write their stories

== Honors and awards ==
- Scholarship, West Chester Poetry Conference, 2011
- Fellowship, Virginia Center for the Creative Arts
- Walter E. Dakin Fellowship, Sewanee Writers’ Conference
- Fellowship, Mid Atlantic Arts Foundation, 2009
- Tennessee Williams scholar, Sewanee Writers' Conference
- Fellowship, MacDowell Colony

== Books ==
- Deborah Ager; M. E. Silverman, eds. (September 26, 2013). The Bloomsbury Anthology of Contemporary Jewish American Poetry. Bloomsbury Academic. ISBN 978-1-4411-8879-3.
- Deborah Ager; Bill Beverly; John Poch, eds. (January 10, 2013). Old Flame: From the First 10 Years of 32 Poems Magazine. WordFarm. ISBN 978-1-60226-013-9.
- Midnight Voices. WordTech Communications LLC. March 1, 2009. ISBN 978-1-934999-42-4.

== Works ==
- "The Lights and Lessons of Toro Nagashi, the Japanese Candle Boat Ceremony," Modern Loss, 2018.
- From the Fishouse, May 2011
- "The Problem With Describing Men"
- "Mangos", Delaware Poetry Review, March 2003
- "The Lake", Connecticut Review, 2002
- "Night in Iowa", Georgia Review, 2000
- "Night: San Francisco", New England Review, 2002
- "Santa Fe In Winter", New England Review, 2002
- "The Space Coast", American Literary Review, 2002

== Personal life ==
Ager is married to the writer Bill Beverly.
