= Diarmuid Russell =

Irish literary agent (1902–1973)

- Born: 17 November 1902; Dublin, Ireland
- Died: 16 December 1973 (aged 71); New York, United States
- Other name: Diarmuid Conor Russell
- Education: Royal College of Science for Ireland, Dublin
- Occupation: Literary agent
- Known for: Literary influence
- Children: William, Pamela

Diarmuid Russell (17 November 1902 – 16 December 1973) was a literary agent and a central figure in the American fiction industry in the second half of the 20th century. He was the agent representing the rights of many of the major writers of the era.

== Early life ==
Russell was born in Dublin, Ireland in Coulson Avenue, Rathgar, where his parents lived next door to Maud Gonne. His father, George Russell (Æ) was then the secretary of the Irish Agricultural Organisation Society, and a noted poet and painter at the centre of literary and theosophical and agricultural circles. Æ's 'at homes' on Sunday nights were attended by a mixture of tweedy farmers, poets, artists, socialists and mystics. His mother, Violet North, was a quiet support to all around her; Gonne describes her wearing "a blue overall which matched the colour of her lovely eyes". His father was mentor to William Butler Yeats, or as Diarmuid Russell knew him, 'Uncle Bill', and was the first publisher of James Joyce's short stories.

He graduated from the Royal College of Science for Ireland with a degree in engineering, but went to work for his father, copyediting his magazine The Irish Statesman

== Literary agent ==
In the dark year 1929 he left for America. In Chicago he worked in Marshall Field's book department and married Rose Lauder. In 1935 they moved to New York where he was employed in the editorial department of G. P. Putnam's Sons, where he was fired after protesting a contract that disadvantaged an author.

Maxwell Perkins, the editor of F. Scott Fitzgerald and Ernest Hemingway, suggested that Russell set up a literary agency, and introduced him to Henry Volkening. The two young men set up in business together as Russell & Volkening Inc, with Diarmuid Russell as president and Henry Volkening as treasurer.

One of his first letters went out to Eudora Welty, whose short stories he had read and admired. "I suppose you know the parasitic way an agent works taking 10% of the author's takings. He is rather a benevolent parasite because authors as a rule make much more when they have an agent than they do without one." Welty accepted the deal. In December he sold his first of her stories to The Atlantic for $200, and made $20 for his six months' work.

His association with Welty was a lifetime friendship. He proceeded to pick up other clients, the agency representing Bernard Malamud, Anne Tyler, George Plimpton, Barbara Tuchman, Saul Bellow, Nadine Gordimer and many others.

Walt Disney had spent twenty years trying to persuade PL Travers, the author of the Mary Poppins children's book series, to sell him the rights for a film. Russell persuaded Travers - who had been a close friend and devotee of Æ - to trust Disney and sell him the rights.

Before his death, Russell and Volkening sold the agency, which is now part of the Massie, McQuilkin and Altman (MMQ&A) literary agency.

Russell was a gardener and a lover of all growing things. He led the fund-raising for the New York Botanical Garden the publication of Wildflowers of the United States. He served as secretary of the National Committee for the Wild Flowers of the United States, established to raise funds for the books.

As a writer, he collected favourite stories in The Portable Irish Reader (Viking 1946), and edited Selected Prose of George Bernard Shaw (Dodd Mead 1952).

== Personal life ==
Diarmuid Russell married Rose Lauder, and they had two children, William and Pamela.
