= Amanda Auchter =

American writer, professor, and editor

- Born: 1977 (age 48–49); Baytown, Texas
- Occupations: professor, writer, editor
- Writing career
- Notable works: The Wishing Tomb; The Glass Crib; Light Under Skin
- Notable awards: Perugia Press Award; Zone 3 Press First Book Award; Bucknell Younger Poets Fellowship; Mary C. Mohr Award; Theodore Morrison Scholarship; Marica and Jan Vilcek Prize
- Website: www.amanda-auchter.com/index.html

Amanda Auchter (born 1977 Baytown, Texas) is an American writer, professor, and editor. She is an editor and author of poetry, nonfiction essays, and book reviews.

== Personal life ==
Amanda Auchter received her Bachelor of Arts degree in Creative Writing and English (magna cum laude) from the University of Houston, where she worked as an editorial assistant at Gulf Coast: A Journal of Literature and Fine Arts and was awarded the 2005 Howard Moss Poetry Award. She received her Masters of Fine Arts in Creative Writing and Literature from Bennington College, where she served as the editor of the Bennington Review.

She is the editor of the literary magazine, Pebble Lake Review. She is the author of the books, "The Wishing Tomb," winner of the Perugia Press Award, "The Glass Crib," winner of the Zone 3 Press First Book Award for Poetry, judged by Rigoberto González, and of the chapbook, "Light Under Skin" (Finishing Line Press, 2006).

== Awards and honors ==
- 2012 Perugia Press Award
- 2011 Southern Indiana Review/Mary C. Mohr Poetry Award
- 2010 Zone 3 Press First Book Award for Poetry
- 2009 Magliocco Prize for Poetry, Bellevue Literary Review
- 2007 Theodore Morrison Scholarship in Poetry for the Bread Loaf Writers' Conference
- 2007 Finalist, Ruth Lilly Poetry Fellowship from The Poetry Foundation
- 2006 BOMB Magazine Poetry Prize
- 2005 James Wright Poetry Award from Mid-American Review
- 2005 Milton Kessler Memorial Poetry Award from Harpur Palate
- 2005 Bucknell University Younger Poets Fellowship

== Books ==
- The Wishing Tomb. Perugia Press. 2012. ISBN 9780979458255. Archived from the original on 2013-03-31.
- The Glass Crib. Zone 3 Press. 2011. ISBN 9780978612764.

== Works ==
- "The Good Friday Flood, New Orleans, 1927", The Journal, 2012
- "The Sister Wakes with a Tube in Her Throat", Quarterly West, 2012
- "Holt Cemetery, New Orleans", Anti-, 2012
- "Tether", RHINO, 2010
- "The Bottom Drawer", Bellevue Literary Review, 2010
- "Nothing But the Shape", Bellevue Literary Review, 2008
- "Down in the 9", Superstition Review, 2010
- "Poem for the Adoptive Mother", Linebreak, 2008
- "6220 Camp Street", diode, 2010
- "Fall of the Medici", Perihelion
- "Water Jealousy", Diagram 4.5
- "St. Cecilia, The Incorrupt", AGNI, 2006 by Amanda Auchter
- "The Martyrdom of Saint Agatha", AGNI, October 2008 by Amanda Auchter
- "Pencil in the Obvious", Born Magazine

=== Anthologies ===
- Best New Poets 2006
- Two Weeks: A Digital Anthology of Contemporary Poetry 2011
- The Best of the Bellevue Literary Review 2008
- DIAGRAM.2 Anthology 2006
