= John Poch =

American poet

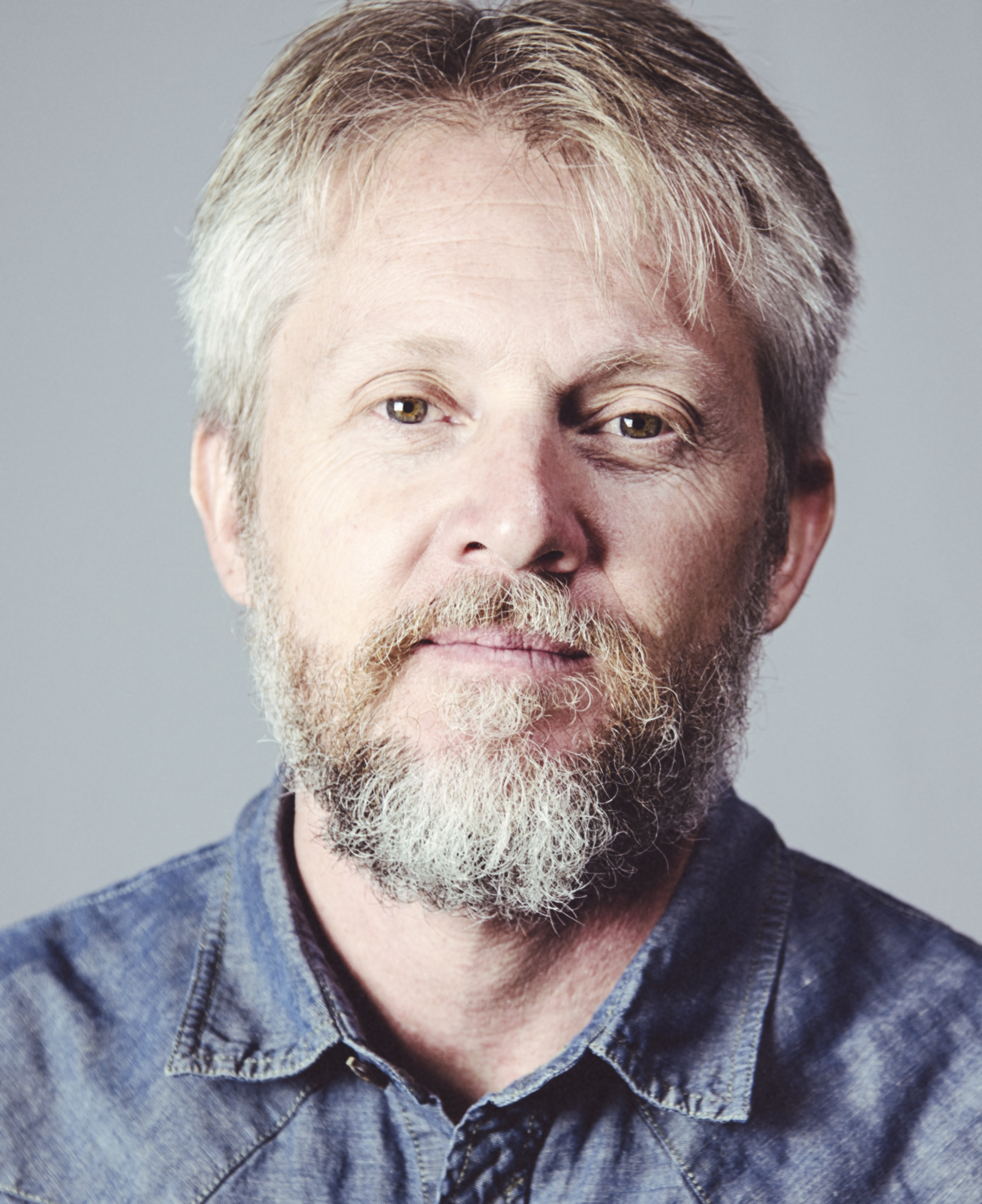
- Born: 1966 (age 59–60)
- Occupation: Author/Professor

John Poch (born 1966 in Erie, Pennsylvania) is an American poet, fiction writer, and critic.

== Biography ==
John Poch holds an M.F.A. in Poetry from the University of Florida and a Ph.D. in English from the University of North Texas. He was the inaugural Colgate University Creative Writing Fellow, and from 2001 to 2023 he taught in the creative writing program at Texas Tech University. He serves as series editor for the Vassar Miller Poetry Prize at the University of North Texas Press, and for ten years edited 32 Poems with poet Deborah Ager.

In 2023, Poch accepted the position of Professor of English and Creative Writing at Grace College in Winona Lake, Indiana. In this role, he has also served as one of the original organizers of the Winona Christian Writer's Conference.

== Awards ==
- Fulbright Core Scholar Fellowship (University of Barcelona, 2014)
- New Criterion Poetry Prize
- Donald Justice Poetry Prize
- Dorothy Sargent Rosenberg Poetry Prize
- Colgate Creative Writing Fellowship
- The Nation/Discovery Prize

== Publications ==
=== Poetry collections ===
- The Future of Love. Slant Books, forthcoming.
- Pietro Federico, Most of the Stars: An American Song (translator). St Augustine's Press. 2025.
- Cantiamo, Prendiamo Il Coltello (translated by Pietro Federico). Edizioni Ensemble. 2022.
- Gracious: Poems from the 21st Century South. Texas Tech University Press. 2020.
- Between Two Rivers. Texas Tech University Press. 2019. ISBN 9781682830383.
- TEXASES. Wordfarm. 2019. ISBN 9781602260221.
- Fix Quiet. St. Augustine's Press. 2015. ISBN 978-1587312694.
- Old Flame (editor, with Deborah Ager and Bill Beverly). WordFarm Press. 2012.
- Longsuffering.
- Dolls. Orchises Press. 2009. ISBN 9781932535204.
- Two Men Fighting with a Knife. Story Line Press. 2008. ISBN 9780978599799.
- Ghost Towns of the Enchanted Circle. Flying Horse Editions. 2007.
- Chad Davidson and John Poch. Hockey Haiku: The Essential Collection. St. Martin's Press. 2006. ISBN 9780312356071.
- Poems. Orchises Press. 2004. ISBN 9781932535006.

=== Criticism ===
- Notes on the Poet: A Little Book of Criticism. Measure Press. 2023.
- God's Poems: The Beauty of Poetry and the Christian Imagination. St Augustine's Press. 2022.

=== Chapbook ===
- In Defense of the Fall. Trilobite Press. 2000.

== Online Works ==
- "Shrike", Videopoem
- "Sonnet on Time", Videopoem
- "3 Prose Poems", Hobart
- "The Ghost Town", Verse Daily
- "February Flu", Paris Review
- "Elegy for a Suicide", Poetry
- "Light and Dark", Plume
- "A prodigal", First Things
- "John Poch | Rattlecast 298", Rattlecast YouTube
- "Rock and Roll", Shenandoah
