= Geier (surname) =

Geier is a common surname in Germany and somewhat less common among German-American people. It is also found as a French surname, and as Russian surname. The latter probably is associated with German emigration to Russia in the 17th and 18th centuries. The surname Geier is often considered to be interchangeable with Geyer, although some sources ascribe a different origin and meaning to the two surnames. German migrants to English-speaking countries often Anglicize Geier as Geyer, though this change has become less common in recent years. Similarly, Geier has often been mistakenly changed to Geyer, and vice versa in legal papers such as birth certificates and migration documents, especially in areas where the name is uncommon, or one version is vastly prevalent.

Many using the surname Geier share an oral history attributing its origins to a heroic band of peasant villagers who climbed high to an aerie and clubbed to death a gigantic raptor (a geier) which had been stealing and eating human babies from their village.

As with the surname "Geier", the surname "Geyer" is primarily associated with the word "vulture". This is often used in a pejorative sense, however (as in "nickname for a greedy or rapacious person, from Middle High and Middle Low German gir(e) as in ‘large bird of prey’, ‘vulture’"). When affixed to a Jewish family, the surname "Geier" is thought by some to have a slightly different meaning. The Yiddish word geyer means "peddler", and it is assumed that when last names became mandatory in Europe, the surname Geier was imposed upon Jewish peasants as a deprecatory label connoting a scheming merchant who takes advantage of the cupidity of others, i.e., a "vulture". The word "geier" more recently has evolved as a "derogatory term for persons from the Middle East".

== Coats of arms ==
The etymological confusion associated with ornithological use of the term "geier" also has affected family coats of arms and traditions concerning family origins of those bearing the Geier surname. Some oral traditions and family histories associate the Geier surname with the eagle (as in the "Eagle's Nest" coat of arms) and with a peasant legend concerning a baby-stealing bird of prey in a medieval Swabian or Saxon village. Others associate the surname with the carrion-eating, bone-crushing variety of vulture. In modern times, it is not unusual for the vulture in family coats of arms or logos to be rendered as a comical caricature of a slumping and sad-sack buzzard rather than a lammergeier or gyrfalcon with "the bearing of an eagle".

== Notable persons and usages of the name ==
=== Florian Geier ===
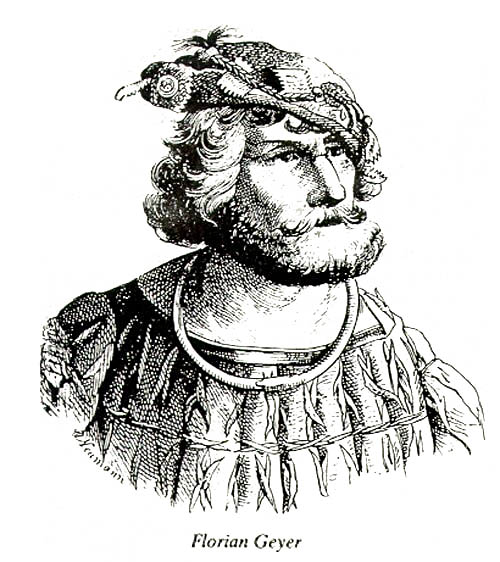
Florian Geier, 1894

The most notorious historical personage bearing the name was Florian Geier, commonly known as Florian Geyer, a Franconian nobleman who sided with the peasants in the German Peasants' War in the early 16th century and led the ill-fated Black Company of song and fable. Several generations of the family of Florian Geyer lived in the village of Giebelstadt, where the Geyer castle is located, but the family is thought to have died off and become extinct in the early 18th century. The heraldic coat of arms of the Geyer family in Giebelstadt was not a vulture or an eagle; instead, it originally was a horse, and later became a ram in the latter part of the 17th century. See N. Shmitt, A Short Giebelstadt History (2000)

=== Baseball: Phil Geier ===
One professional baseball player bearing the Geier surname is recorded: Phil Geier, aka "Little Phil", who played for several major league teams between 1896 and 1904 and won the American Association batting title in 1903.

=== Legal history ===
Two significant cases in United States jurisprudence have involved litigants with the name "Geier". In one of these, Geier v. American Honda Motor Co. (98-1811) 529 U.S. 861 (2000), the United States Supreme Court held that the federal legislation requiring passive restraints in motor vehicles sold in the United States pre-empted state tort law. The plaintiff was a child named Alexis Geier who had been seriously injured in an accident while riding with her parents in a Honda passenger vehicle equipped with seat belts but not airbags. The Supreme Court held that Ms. Geier could not sue Honda for failing to install airbags in a vehicle sold in 1987 because at that time, only seatbelts were required by federal law.

The other case, commonly known as the "Geier Case", involved an African American teacher named Rita Sanders at what was then Tennessee Agricultural and Industrial State University, now known as Tennessee State University. She sued on behalf of herself and others in a class action to compel the State of Tennessee to end its de facto operation of a dual post-secondary education system for white and non-white students. This litigation was initiated by Ms. Sanders in 1968. Ms. Sanders later married and became known as Rita Sanders Geier. The case had a tortuous history as the United States Government and a number of other plaintiffs joined in support of her position, and involved at least a dozen reported appellate court decisions, including Geier v. Sundquist, 94 F.3d 644 (6th Cir. 1996); Geier v. Richardson, 871 F. 2d 1310 (6th Cir. 1989); Geier v. Alexander, 801 F.2d 799 (6th Cir. 1986); Geier v. Alexander, 593 F. Supp. 1263 (M.D. Tenn. 1984); Geier v. University of Tennessee, 597 F.2d 1056 (6th Cir.), cert. denied, 444 U.S. 886 (1979); Geier v. Blanton, 427 F. Supp. 644 (M.D. Tenn. 1977); Geier v. Dunn, 337 F. Supp. 573 (M.D. Tenn. 1972); and Sanders v. Ellington, 288 F. Supp. 937 (M.D. Tenn. 1968). The case was "resolved" 38 years later by a consent decree or settlement agreement in 2001, which imposed a 5-year period for implementation of various programmatic measures (colloquially known as Geier programs) to unwind 200 years of segregation and discrimination in the system of public higher education in Tennessee. The final confirmation of the Consent Decree was approved in September 2006. As stated in the Joint Statement in Support of the Consent Decree, "The Geier case stands first in terms of time and precedent in a line of cases devoted to the removal of a variety of vestiges of segregation from systems of public higher education."

=== Prominent American persons named "Geier" ===
Well known representatives of the Geier surname include the Geier Glove Company and the Geier Sausage Company, neither of which have any necessary connection with each other or any other American bearer of the Geier surname.

Another well-known representative of the Geier name was the founder of the Cincinnati Milling Machine Company (originally the Cincinnati Screw and Tap Company), Frederick V. Geier, whose company is still controlled by the Geier family (but now known as Cincinnati Milacron, Inc.). This branch of the Geier family has been prominent in Cincinnati civic and social affairs since the early 20th century, and has endowed the Geier Collections and Research Center of the Museum of Natural History and Science in Cincinnati. Frederick V. Geier was quoted in a Time magazine article on rearmament in 1951.

=== Geiers in Minnesota ===
Two extended families with the surname Geier are found in Southern and Central Minnesota. The family associated with Lynn Township in McLeod County and with Boon Lake Township and other parts of Renville County is entirely descended from a single immigrant from Woldegk, Germany, by the name of Ferdinand Theodore Geier, a/k/a Ted Geier, who arrived in Minnesota in 1880 after spending 10 years as a wheelwright and truck farmer in Chicago, Illinois and nearby Cicero, Illinois. The other family, near Ortonville in Big Stone County is unrelated so far as is known. A small contingent of the Renville County Geiers settled for a brief time in Badger Township in Polk County before scattering to the winds in the latter part of the 20th century. The current president of the Minnesota Medical Association, G. Richard Geier, Jr., MD, of Rochester, Minnesota, is a native of Evansville, Indiana and not a member of either of these two Minnesota Geier families.

=== Other notable people ===
- Jens Geier, German politician
- John Geier, American psychologist
- Mark Geier (born 1948), American physician
- Oscar Geier (1882-1942), Swiss bobsledder
- Philip Geier, American businessman
- Sofia Landon Geier (born 1949), Canadian soap opera writer and actor
- Helmut Josef Geier, known as DJ Hell (born 1962), German DJ
- Michael Geier, American singer/entertainer, who performs as Puddles Pity Party

== See also ==
- German family name etymology
- Geier (disambiguation)
