= The Dickey Club =

Harvard University social club (1851–1924)

- Founded: 1851; 175 years ago Harvard University
- Type: Harvard social club
- Affiliation: Delta Kappa Epsilon; Independent
- Status: Merged
- Merge date: 1924
- Successor: Institute of 1770 D. K. E.
- Emphasis: Sophomores
- Scope: Local
- Chapters: 1
- Nickname: The Dickey, Dickie
- Former name: Delta Kappa Epsilon
- Headquarters: Cambridge, Massachusetts; United States

The Dickey Club, often referred to as simply "The Dickey" (sometimes spelled "Dickie"), was a private social club at Harvard University, originally founded in 1851 as a chapter of the Delta Kappa Epsilon fraternity. The Club included members such as former U.S. President Theodore Roosevelt, newspaper magnate William Randolph Hearst, and financier J.P. Morgan Jr. The Dickey merged with the Institute of 1770, forming the "Institute of 1770, D. K. E.", only to be absorbed by the Hasty Pudding Club in 1924.

== History ==
The history of the Dickey Club stretches back to 1844 when Delta Kappa Epsilon (DKE) fraternity was founded at Yale University. At the time, social societies at Yale were year-based, with certain societies reserved for seniors, and others reserved for juniors, sophomores, and freshmen. Upon its founding at Yale, DKE followed the convention of the other societies at the time, making itself a junior-class society from which the senior-class secret societies, such as Skull and Bones and Scroll and Key would select their members.

When DKE expanded to Harvard on October 15, 1851, it quickly morphed into a semi-independent sophomore society known as "the Dickey Club" (a phonetic rendering of the initialism "D.K.E."), while still maintaining its status as an affiliated DKE chapter on paper.

The 19th-century Harvard social ecosystem was multi-tiered, in which students at the beginning of their sophomore year who were deemed to be the "social elite" were invited to join the Institute of 1770. The Institute of 1770 was the first rung on the Harvard social ladder, comprising the top 100 students at Harvard in terms of their social standing as determined by their peers. At the beginning of each new year, the former Institute of 1770 (who were now juniors) would vote for who they believed were the top 10 most socially elite in the new sophomore class. Those top ten would then vote among themselves for who they believed to be the next 10 below them. Those ten would then vote for who they believed to be the next ten. This pattern would repeat until the top 100 students in the sophomore class had been selected and ranked. These 100 newly selected members of the sophomore class then became the new Institute of 1770.

From the Institute of 1770, those who ranked high enough were granted acceptance into the Dickey Club, from which the Waiting Clubs (junior societies) and Final Clubs (senior societies) would then "punch" their members.

In 1890, unimpressed with the Harvard chapter's general lack of interest in maintaining their alliance with fellow DKE chapters, the Dickey Club was threatened with disaffiliation from the national Delta Kappa Epsilon fraternity. The Dickey Club sent a delegation to the annual DKE convention to discuss their continued affiliation, at which time several requirements were set by the national organization for the club to retain its status as an affiliated DKE chapter. Notably, the Dickey Club would be required to officially recognize DKE members from other chapters. However, due to the Dickey Club's unique selection process and role in the Harvard social ecosystem, the Dickey Club declined to recognize non-Harvard DKEs as equal to its own members and consequently ended its association with Delta Kappa Epsilon in November 1891, continuing thereafter as an independent Harvard social club.

Following an official merger with the Institute of 1770, the amalgamated "Institute of 1770, D. K. E." merged with the Hasty Pudding Club in 1924.

== Initiation ritual ==
As with most secret societies, little is known about the initiation rituals of the Dickey Club, and references to it are few and far between. What is known is that at one point, there appear to have been two phases of initiation into the Dickey Club: a public phase, followed by a private ritual. According to an article published in The Cambridge Tribune, the public phase of the initiation lasted a full week and seemed to constitute fairly standard hazing-type practices. The first night included stripping initiates down to just their pants and having them run by current members while they were slapped and punched; a practice known as "running the gauntlet". After the first night, "[t]he members-elect are made to wear sneakers, a flannel suit and shirt, and must go without their hats, no matter what the season of the year. For five long days and nights, they wear these clothes, and for this eternity, they must never be seen walking. They must always run – run to lectures, run to lunch, run to their rooms, run to their dinners, run everywhere, run here for one member, run there for another. Hence the terms "running for the Dickie."

Once the public phase of the initiation was complete, the neophytes were officially inducted into the Dickey Club in a private ritual. The only known first-hand account of the private portion of the initiation ritual comes from the memoirs of Julian Hawthorne, the son of Nathaniel Hawthorne. Hawthorne writes that he was initiated into the Dickey Club on the evening of May 18, 1864:

I was initiated into a college secret society—a couple of hours of grotesque and good-humored rodomontade and horseplay, in which I cooperated as in a kind of pleasant nightmare, confident, even when branded with a red-hot iron or doused head-over-heels in boiling oil, that it would come out all right. The neophyte is effectively blindfolded during the proceedings, and at last, still sightless, I was led down flights of steps into a silent crypt, and helped into a coffin, where I was to stay until the Resurrection.

After lying in the coffin for a while, Hawthorne states that he was visited by an older classmate dressed as a "friendly demon", with whom he had a conversation, and that "After a while, he went away and I lay in peace: until a bevy of roistering friends arrived, hoisted me out, hurried me up the steps, snatched off bandages, and lo! I was in a brightly lighted room filled with jolly fellows who were shaking hands with me, giving me the 'grip,' and leading me to a large bowl brimming with claret punch."

The ritual of being led into a crypt and then lying in a coffin and conversing with a "demon" mirrors the initiation ritual of the Yale secret society Skull and Bones. In the book Fleshing Out Skull & Bones, the grandson of DKE and Skull and Bones member Clifton Samuel Thomas stated, "I have always felt there was a very, very close connection between The Order [Skull and Bones] and DKE."

This "very, very close connection" is borne out by membership overlap: between DKE's founding in 1844 and 1918, 326 members of Skull and Bones were also members of Delta Kappa Epsilon. Given that each Skull and Bones class consisted of only fifteen members, this figure suggests that roughly one in three Bonesmen during this period were also members of DKE. Indeed, DKE was the first Yale society to imitate the Skull and Bones clubhouse, constructing its own chapter house at Yale in 1861, modeled after the Tomb. Taken together, these facts strongly indicate that Yale's Delta Kappa Epsilon fraternity functioned as a feeder into Skull and Bones. Moreover, because DKE's initiation ritual deliberately echoed that of Skull and Bones, those ritual elements were transmitted and preserved when the tradition continued at Harvard in the form of the Dickey Club.

== Clubhouse ==
The Dickey Club occupied several clubrooms in Cambridge during the late nineteenth century. In the autumn of 1879, the club moved from the Old Jones Blacksmith building into rooms located in Moore's Block on Brattle Street, Cambridge. The club continued to occupy these quarters for two decades, beginning with the Class of 1882.

The rooms in Moore's Block were located on the upper floors and served as the club's primary meeting space during this period. On May 10, 1888, the Dickey Club rooms were raided by Cambridge police officers, who seized a large quantity of alcoholic beverages. Contemporary newspaper accounts described the club as being composed of prominent Harvard students and noted that the raid was part of a broader enforcement effort targeting Harvard undergraduate clubs.

On November 27, 1899, a fire broke out in the building at 6–8 Brattle Street, causing extensive damage and an estimated loss of $30,000. The building housed more than a dozen tenants, including the Dickey Club, which lost all of its furnishings, artwork, and collected memorabilia.

== Notable members ==
The Club included members such as former U.S. President Theodore Roosevelt, newspaper magnate William Randolph Hearst, and financier J.P. Morgan Jr.

== See also ==
- Harvard College Social Clubs
- Collegiate secret societies in North America
