= Hunt Wentworth =

photograph of Wentworth

Hunt Wentworth (October 24, 1895–December 16, 1929) was an American society figure from Chicago. The scion of a prominent Chicago family, Wentworth was a standout member in the Harvard University class of 1917, he was editor of The Harvard Lampoon, captained the Harvard Crimson swimming team, was a member of the city council, was selected as the 1917 Ivy Orator, and was president of the Fox Club. Wentworth fought for the United States in World War I. He was engaged in the early commercial aviation industry, working in the Chicago operations of Sikorsky Aircraft and Curtiss Flying Service. Curtiss was a prominent society figure in Chicago. He committed suicide in 1929 at the age of 34, which his brother credited to a period of despondency after Wentworth found himself unable to occupy himself after being dismissed from his job.

== Early life, family, and education ==
Wentworth was born in Chicago on October 24, 1895. He was educated at Phillips Exeter Academy.

A member of the Wentworth family, he was a son of Moses J. Wentworth, a prominent Chicagoan. His mother was Lizzie Shaw Wentworth (née Hunt Shaw), who was regarded to be a prominent socialite. He was a paternal grandnephew of former congressman and Chicago mayor John Wentworth. His ancestry traces back to signers of the Constitution of the United States.

== Harvard University and World War I military service ==
portrait image of Wentworth from the 1917 Harvard yearbook

Wentworth graduated from Harvard, where he was a very popular member of his graduating class (the class of 1917). In his senior year, Wentworth was voted the superlatives of his graduating classes' handsomest and funniest man. He was the 1916 editor of The Harvard Lampoon. In his senior year, he was a member of the student council.

Wentworth played sports for Harvard Crimson teams. He played for Harvard Crimson football. During his freshman year he played for the freshman football squad and in his sophomore year he played for the second team. He competed for the swimming team for all four years he attended Harvard. He captained the team, having been elected its captain in March 1916.

Wentworth was president of the Fox Club from 1916 to 1917, and president of the cam pus chapter of Delta Kappa Epsilon in 1917. He was a member of the Hasty Pudding Club, Institute of 1770, Signet Society, the Exeter Club, and the O. K. Society.

Amid the American entry into World War I, Wentworth joined the Reserve Officers' Training Corps. He resigned as editor of the Harvard Lampoon to accommodate his training. While Wentworth had been voted in December 1916 to be the Ivy Orator during Harvard's 1917 Class Day, his speech was ultimately replaced by a performance from the Harvard Reserve Officers Band because Wentworth was training at Fort Sheridan and unable to attend Class Day. Similarly, the selected class poet –Westmore Wilcox– was also unable to attend the Class Day festivities due to military training. In his war service, Wentworth was captain of infantry in the Blackhawk Division (86th Infantry Division).

== Career and activities ==
Wentworth was described to have been an independently wealthy individual. After his father's death in 1922, he inherited $500,000 or more from his father's $1,500,000 estate. He was a sportsman and a member of various society clubs. He was at one time the secretary of Chicago's Saddle & Cycle Club. In 1924, Wentworth was one of an elite 108 Chicagoans who were invited to a ball organized by Wolcott Blair at the club for the Prince of Wales (future King Edward VIII) when the prince visited the city.

Wentworth worked as the Chicago representative of Sikorsky Aircraft , which at the time concentrated its business on amphibious aircraft. He advocated for the then-planned Chicago lakefront airport to include a landing station in the adjacent harbor for such aircraft. Wentworth also worked as the secretary of the Chicago branch of the Curtiss Flying Service. He was also assistant to the president of the same company. He was dismissed from his employment in November 1929.

== Personal life ==
Wentworth was the best man in the October 1925 wedding of Kimball Salisbury (a member of the family that owned W.W. Kimball and Company) and Isabel Wilmot Eaton (daughter of Colonel William H. Eaton).

=== Engagement ===
Two months before his death, Wentworth announced his engagement to Eileen Smith with a wedding expected for early 1930. There was public interest in the fact that Wentworth, hailing from a well-established upper-class Chicago family, was engaged to a woman regarded to be below his social strata. While Wentworth was from a long-established family from the Gold Coast neighborhood on Chicago's North Side, Smith hailed from the South Side and her family was best-known for the political activities of her mother (Anna L. Smith, commissioner of the city's Bureau of Public Welfare and former committeewoman of the Democratic National Committee). The engagement was broken-off approximately two weeks prior to his death.

=== Suicide ===
On the night of December 16, 1929, Wentworth's body was found at his mother's apartment in Chicago's Gold Coast, dead from a bullet wound to his forehead and clutching a handgun in his right hand. He was 34 years old. A Cook County Coroner's jury judged his death to have been a suicide. It is believed that Wentworth stood in front of a full-length mirror, placed the handgun to his forehead, and then pulled the trigger. The only individuals in the residence at the time were household servants. His body was discovered by his mother, who thereafter placed a call to her other, son, John. John then summoned a physician to the house. The physician pronounced Wentworth deceased and notified a local police precinct. It was believed his mother had found his body one hour after he committed suicide.

Wentworth's brother, John, speculated that the motivations of Wentworth to commit suicide had been the "emotional effects of his war experience" and an extended period of depression and despondency after ending his work for the Curtiss Flying Service. He noted that after leaving his position with the company, Wentworth had struggled. While Wentworth was wealthy (worth an estimated $500,000), his loss of employment and inability to find new work left him without a means to occupy his time, which negatively impacted his mood. Wentworth's mother informed police officers that Wentworth had appeared despondent the day of his death. Wentworth's brother John speculated, "I don't think it was any [one] particular thing that caused him to commit suicide, but simply a wrong state of mind."

Wentworth's suicide was well-reported, including being the main cover story of the following day's Chicago Tribune.
