= Porcellian Club =

Final club at Harvard University, US

- Founded: 1791; 235 years ago Harvard University
- Type: Final club
- Affiliation: Independent
- Status: Active
- Scope: Local
- Motto: Dum vivimus vivamus "While we live, let us live"
- Symbol: Golden Pig
- Mascot: Pig
- Chapters: 1
- Nickname: Porc, P.C., Porkies
- Headquarters: 1324 Massachusetts Avenue; Cambridge, Massachusetts 02138; United States

- Porcellian Club
- U.S. National Register of Historic Places
- U.S. Historic district – Contributing property
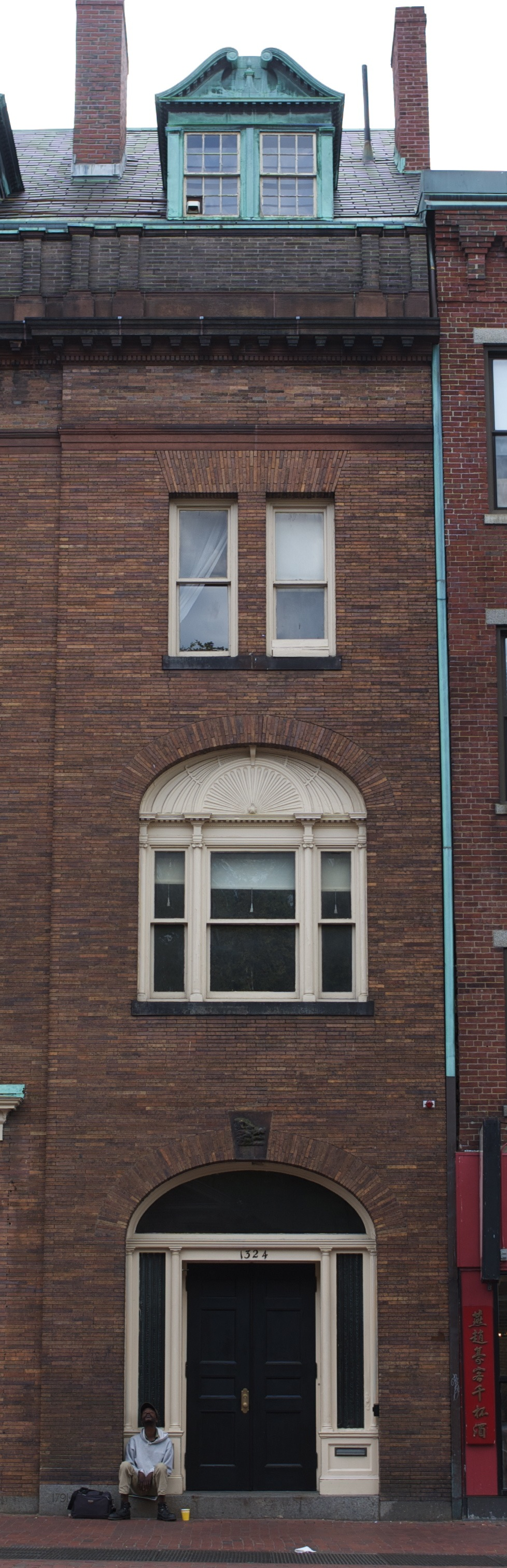
- Location: 1320-24 Massachusetts Ave. Cambridge, Massachusetts
- Coordinates: 42°22′22.55″N 71°07′04.10″W
- Part of: Harvard Square Historic District (ID86003654)
- MPS: Cambridge MRA
- NRHP reference No.: 83000824

Significant dates
- Added to NRHP: June 30, 1983
- Designated CP: July 28, 1988

The Porcellian Club is an all-male final club at Harvard University, colloquially known as the Porc or the P.C. Its founding is traditionally dated to either 1791, when a group began meeting under the name "the Argonauts," or 1794, the year of a roast pig dinner that formally established the club under its initial name, the "Pig Club." The club's Epicurean motto, Dum vivimus vivamus ("While we live, let us live"), and its emblem—a pig—reflect its origins. Members often wear golden pig motifs on watch chains or neckties adorned with pig-head symbols.

Regarded as Harvard’s "oldest and most prestigious" social club, the Porcellian has been described as the iconic "hotsy-totsy final club" and is frequently cited by the university as "the most final of them all."

== History ==
The Porcellian Club traces its origins to 1791, though its formal establishment is often linked to a roast pig dinner in 1794. According to a February 23, 1887, article in The Harvard Crimson, the club emerged from a student prank involving a pig:

This society was established in 1791. It occupies rooms on Harvard street and owns a library of some 7000 volumes. Its members are taken from the senior, junior and sophomore classes about eight from each class. The origin of its name is popularly supposed to be as follows:

In the year 1791, a student brought a pig into his room in Hollis. In those days the window-seats were merely long boxes with lids, used to store articles in. Said student having an antipathy to the proctor who roomed beneath, was accustomed to squeeze piggy's ears and make him squeal whenever said proctor was engaged in the study of the classics. The result would be a rush by the proctor for the student's rooms, where the student was to be found studying (?), peacefully seated on his window-seat. Piggy, in the mean time had been deposited beneath, and no sound disturbed the tranquillity of the scene. On the departure of the hated proctor, a broad grin would spread over the countenance of the joker and in a little while the scene would be repeated with variations. But when it was rumored that his room was to be searched by the faculty, the joker determined to cheat them of their prey. So he invited some of his classmates to the room and the pig being cooked, all present partook of a goodly feast. They enjoyed their midnight meal so much that they determined then and there to form a club and have such entertainments periodically. In order to render historical the origin of the club and also to give it a classic touch, they decided to call it the Porcellian from Latin "porcus".

In 1831, the society bearing the name of the "Order of the Knights of the Square Table" was joined to the Porcellian, as "the objects and interests of the two societies were identical".

An 1891 article in the Cambridge Chronicle highlights key founding figures:

Among those who presided at the initial dinners of the club were Robert Treat Paine and Henderson Inches, class of 1792; Charles Cutter, class of 1793; and Rev. Joseph McKean, L.L.D. of 1794. It is to Mr. McKean that the club owes not only its pig, but its principles.

== Symbols ==
The Porcellian Club's motto, Dum vivimus vivamus ("While we live, let us live"), reflects its Epicurean ethos. Its primary symbol is a golden pig, which also serves as the club's mascot. Members, colloquially referred to as "Porkies," often incorporate pig motifs into accessories such as neckties, watch chains, or blazers.

== Clubhouse ==
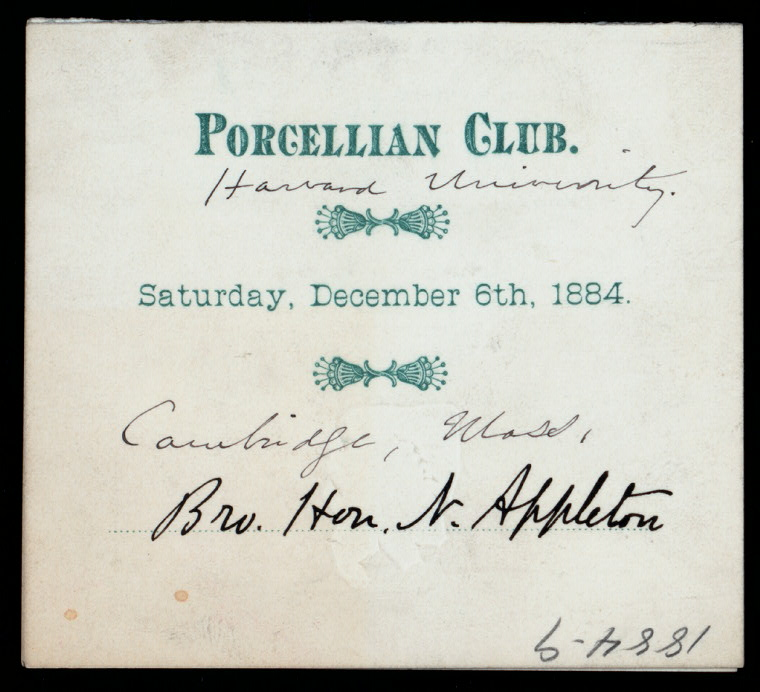
A menu from the Porcellian Club, 1884

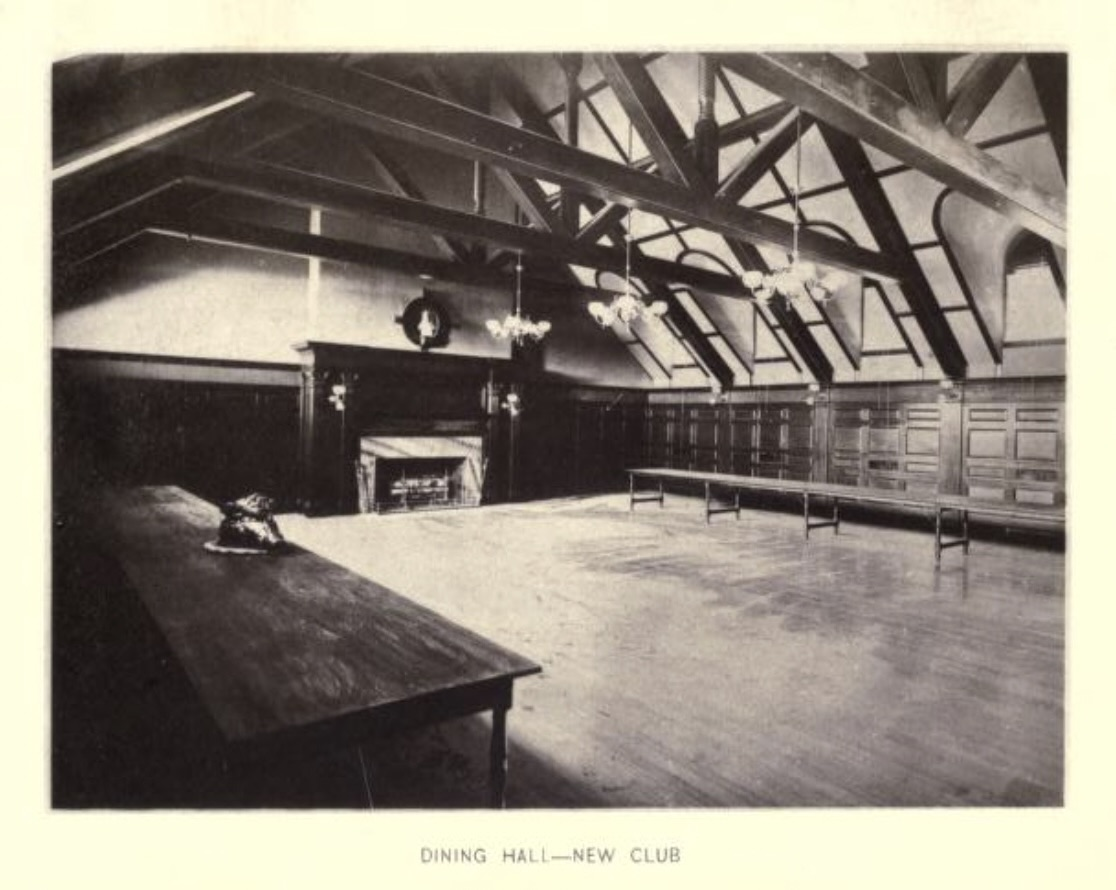

The Porcellian Club's clubhouse is located at 1324 Massachusetts Avenue in Cambridge, Massachusetts, above the former store of clothier J. August. Designed by architect and club member William York Peters, the building's entrance faces Harvard freshman dormitories and the Porcellian Gate (also known as McKean Gate), donated by the club in 1901. The gate, marking the entrance to Harvard Yard, features a limestone carving of a boar's head. Notably, Theodore Roosevelt brought his first wife, Alice Hathaway Lee Roosevelt, to dine at the club during their undergraduate years.

=== Architecture and layout ===
An 1891 article in the Cambridge Chronicle described the newly constructed clubhouse:

The enlargement of the club's library, and the fact of its growing postgraduate or honorary membership roll, compelled it from time to time to enlarge its accommodations. Finally, in 1881, it determined to tear down the old house where it had so long met, on Harvard street and build a new structure its site. The new structure is of brick, handsomely trimmed in stone, and rises to the height of four stories, with about seventy or eighty feet of frontage on Harvard street. Two large stores claim a part of the ground floor, but they do not encroach on the broad and handsome entrance to the club's apartments.

The three upper floors are used exclusively by the club. The first of them contains a large hall which opens both into the front and rear reception rooms and parlors, which, in turn, communicate. From each of these rooms a door leads to the library, which extends through from the front to the rear. On the second floor, in addition to a room over the library, there is a billiard hall in the front and a breakfast room in the rear with the kitchen over the main hall of the floor beneath. Nearly the whole of the top floor is taken up by a large banquet hall, vaulted by handsome rafters.

=== Cultural perception ===
Despite its exclusivity, critics like Jeffrey Hart—a National Review columnist, Ronald Reagan speechwriter, and Dartmouth College professor—questioned the club's mystique. Hart remarked:

…To illustrate, may I invoke Harvard's famous Porcellian, an undergraduate club of extraordinary exclusiveness?…[I]t is devilishly hard to join. But there is nothing there, hardly a club at all. The quarters consist entirely of a large room over a row of stores in Harvard Square. There is a bar, a billiards table and a mirror arranged so that members can sit and view Massachusetts Avenue outside without themselves being seen. That's it…Porcellian is the pinnacle of the Boston idea. Less is more. Zero is a triumph.

=== Notable features ===
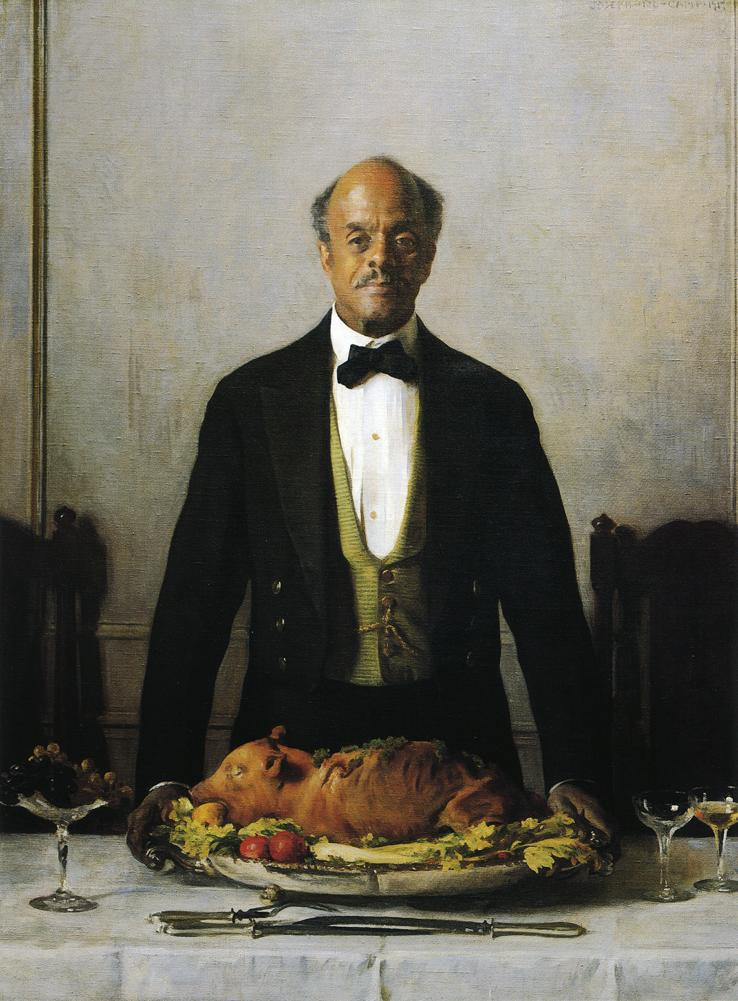
The Steward (1919) by Joseph DeCamp

A portrait titled The Steward (Lewis of the Porcellian) by Joseph DeCamp hangs in the clubhouse, depicting longtime steward George Washington Lewis. A 1929 obituary in Time noted:

George Washington Lewis, of Cambridge, Massachusetts, for over 45 years the esteemed Negro steward of the Porcellian Club at Harvard College; in Cambridge, Massachusetts Ancient and most esoteric of Harvard clubs is Porcellian, founded in 1791.* An oil portrait of Steward Lewis hangs in the clubhouse. Steward Lewis had ten Porcellian pallbearers.

== Historical significance ==
The Porcellian Club has played a notable role in Harvard's social history, particularly through its associations with prominent figures. Theodore Roosevelt and other members of the Roosevelt family were inducted, but his distant cousin Franklin D. Roosevelt—then a Harvard sophomore and later a U.S. President—was not invited to join. Franklin instead joined the rival Fly Club alongside his roommate; three of his sons later followed. According to relative Sheffield Cowles, Franklin reportedly described the rejection as "the greatest disappointment in his life," though this claim may be hyperbolic. Similarly, Joseph P. Kennedy Sr., excluded from the club due to his Catholic background, reportedly held lingering resentment. Biographer David Nasaw noted Kennedy's fixation on the snub: "For years later, Joe Kennedy remembered the day he didn't make the Porcellian Club…realizing that none of the Catholics he knew at Harvard had been selected."

=== Cultural Influence ===
A British 1870 travel book highlighted the club's prestige:

A notice of Harvard would be as incomplete without a reference to the Porcellian Club as a notice of Oxford or Cambridge would be in which the Union Debating Society held no place. This and the Hasty Pudding Club… are the two lions of Harvard. The Porcellian Club is hardly a place of resort for those who cultivate the intellect at the expense of the body. The list of active members is small, owing in part to the largeness of the annual subscription. The great desire of every student is to become a member of it…the doings of the club are shrouded in secrecy…All that can be said by a stranger who has been privileged to step behind the scenes is that the mysteries are rites which can be practised without much labor and yield a pleasure which is fraught with no unpleasant consequences.

The club's influence extended into Boston's elite institutions. Historians note that architect H. H. Richardson's selection to design Trinity Church—a landmark of American architecture—was bolstered by his Porcellian membership. As one historian observed:

The thirty-four-year-old possessed one great advantage over the other candidates: as a popular Harvard undergraduate he had been a member of several clubs, including the prestigious Porcellian; thus he needed no introduction to the rector, Phillips Brooks, or five of the eleven-man building committee—they were all fellow Porcellian members.

== Membership ==
The Porcellian Club historically maintained exclusionary membership practices. A biography of Norman Mailer notes that during his time at Harvard, "It would have been unthinkable... for a Jew to be invited to join one of the so-called final clubs like Porcellian, A.D. Club, Fly, or Spee".

=== Demographic shifts ===
By the late 20th century, the influence of Boston Brahmins at Harvard had waned. A 1986 survey noted that while other final clubs diversified—electing Jewish and Black presidents—the Porcellian admitted only occasional Jewish members and, in 1983, its first African American member, who had attended St. Paul's. This decision reportedly alarmed some alumni.

A 1994 Harvard Crimson article by Joseph Mathews observed evolving trends:

Prep school background, region[,] and legacy status do not appear to be the sole determinants of membership they may once have been, but... they remain factors.

As of 2016, the club remained all-male, defending "the value of single-gender institutions for men and women as a supplement and option to coeducational institutions."

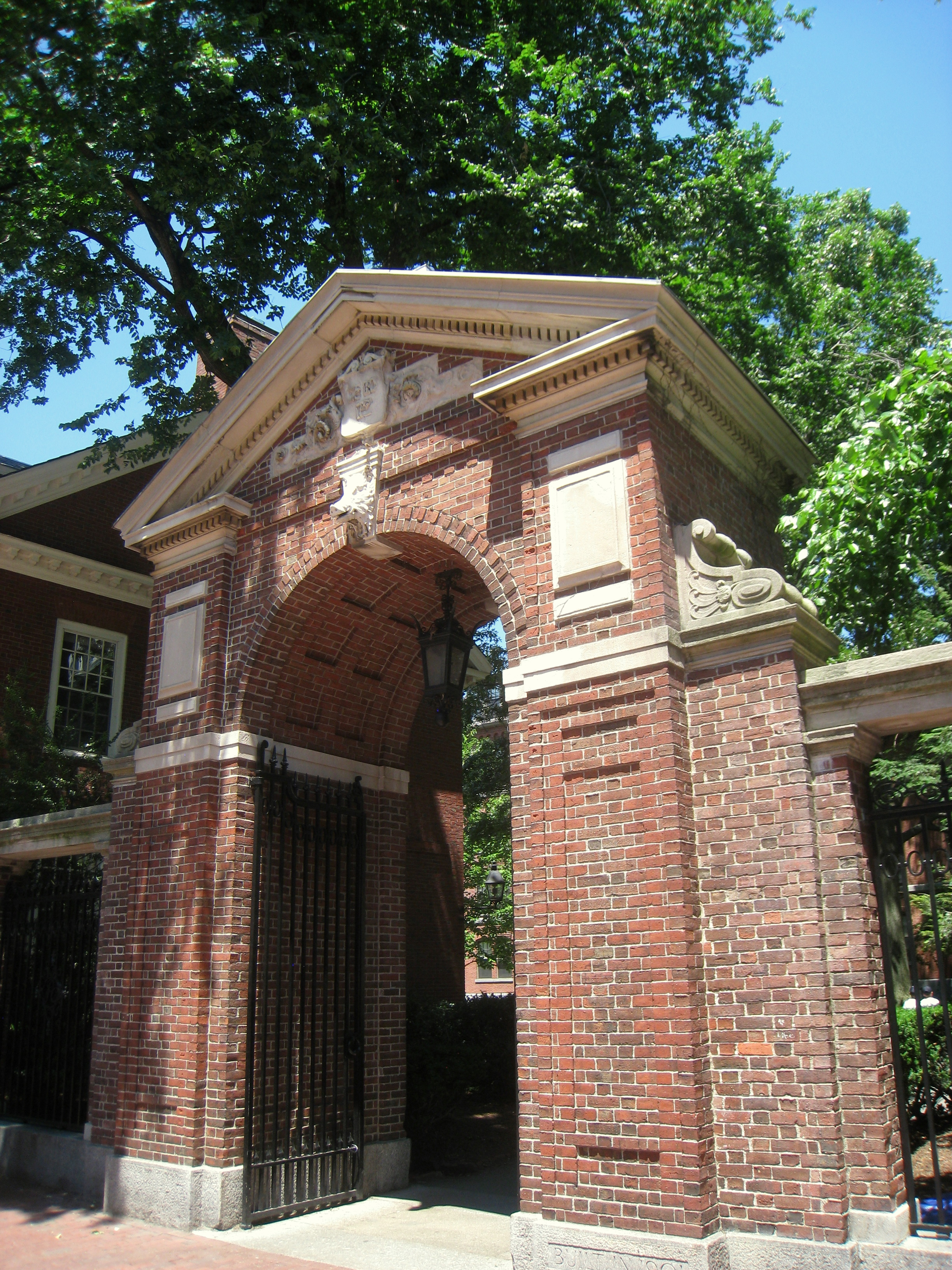
McKean Gate

== Joseph McKean Gate ==
In 1901, the Joseph McKean Gate—a portal to Harvard Yard—was erected directly opposite the Porcellian Clubhouse. A March 20, 1909, notice in The Harvard Crimson announced:

A gate is to be erected at the entrance to the Yard between Wadsworth House and Boylston Hall. It is to be erected by members of the Porcellian Club in memory of Joseph McKean 1794, S.T.D., LL.D. Boylston Professor of Rhetoric, Oratory and Elocution, and also the founder of the Porcellian Club.

The gate prominently displays the Porcellian's symbol, a boar's head, carved in limestone above the central arch. It remains a prominent Harvard landmark, marking the boundary between Harvard Yard and Massachusetts Avenue.

== Notable members ==
The Porcellian Club’s alumni include prominent figures in politics, literature, and academia. A 1929 Time obituary noted its roster featured "Theodore Roosevelt, Theodore Roosevelt Jr., Poet Oliver Wendell Holmes Sr., Justice Oliver Wendell Holmes Jr., Nicholas Longworth, Poet James Russell Lowell, Richard Henry Dana Jr. (Two Years Before the Mast), Novelist Owen Wister, [and] John Jay Chapman." A 1940 Time article added:

The Pork...is very much a family affair. Upon its roster, generation after generation, appear the same proud Boston names—Adams, Ames, Amory, Cabot, Cushing, etc.

Due to the club's semi-secret nature, the full extent of Porcellian membership is unknown.

Selected notable members include:

- Joseph Alsop (1932) – Journalist; co-author of The 168 Days (1938)
- August Belmont Jr. (1875) – Financier; namesake of Belmont Park and the Belmont Stakes
- Charles E. Bohlen (1927) – Diplomat; U.S. Ambassador to the Soviet Union
- William Astor Chanler (1895) – U.S. Congressman from New York
- John Jay Chapman (1884; L.L.D. 1887) – Essayist; translator of Dante and Sophocles
- Benjamin Robbins Curtis (1829) – Associate Justice of the Supreme Court of the United States
- Richard Henry Dana Jr. – Author of Two Years Before the Mast
- Edward Everett – U.S. Secretary of State; President of Harvard; Governor of Massachusetts
- Hamilton Fish III (1910) – College football All-American; U.S. Congressman from New York
- Miles Fisher – Film and television actor
- Oliver Wendell Holmes Sr. – Author, poet; Harvard Medical School professor
- Oliver Wendell Holmes Jr. – Associate Justice of the Supreme Court; Harvard Law School professor
- William Henry Fitzhugh Lee (1858) – Confederate Major General
- Henry Cabot Lodge – U.S. Senator from Massachusetts
- Dan Sullivan – U.S. Senator from Alaska
- James Russell Lowell – Poet; Harvard professor
- Theodore Lyman (1858) – Union Army officer; U.S. Congressman from Massachusetts
- George Gordon Meade (Honorary 1866) – Union Major General; victor of the Battle of Gettysburg
- Paul Nitze – Diplomat; U.S. Secretary of the Navy; co-founder of Johns Hopkins School of Advanced International Studies
- Wendell Phillips – Abolitionist leader
- William Phillips – U.S. Ambassador to Italy
- H. H. Richardson – Architect; designer of Trinity Church, Boston
- Theodore Roosevelt – 26th U.S. President
- Theodore Roosevelt Jr. – Brigadier General; Medal of Honor recipient
- Leverett Saltonstall – Governor and U.S. Senator from Massachusetts
- Louis Agassiz Shaw II – Socialite; subject of Robert Lowell's poem Waking in the Blue
- Robert Gould Shaw (attended 1856–1859) – Colonel of the 54th Massachusetts Infantry Regiment
- Joseph Story (1795) – Associate Justice of the Supreme Court
- Charles Sumner (1830; L.L.D. 1834) – U.S. Senator from Massachusetts
- Benjamin Ogle Tayloe (1814) – Diplomat; political activist
- Edward Thornton Tayloe – Diplomat; nominated U.S. Secretary of the Treasury (1841)
- Henry Constantine Wayne (1834) – Georgia Militia Major General
- Richard Whitney (1911) – President of the New York Stock Exchange (1930–1935)
- Cameron Winklevoss (2004) – Olympic rower; co-founder of ConnectU
- Tyler Winklevoss (2004) – Olympic rower; co-founder of ConnectU
- Grenville Lindall Winthrop – Art collector; benefactor of the Fogg Museum
- Owen Wister (1882) – Author of The Virginian
- John Bozman Kerr (1830) was a U.S. Congressman, representing the sixth district of the state of Maryland from 1849 until 1851. He also served as Chargé d'Affaires to Nicaragua.

== See also ==
- Harvard College social clubs
- National Register of Historic Places listings in Cambridge, Massachusetts
