= List of Alpha Delta Phi Fraternity chapters =

Alpha Delta Phi is a social fraternity located in colleges and universities in North America. In the following list, active chapters are indicated in bold and inactive chapters are in italics.

Chapter	Charter date and range	Institution	Location	Status	Ref.
**Hamilton**	October 29, 1832	Hamilton College	Clinton, New York	Active	
**Miami**	1835–1847, 1851–1873, 1951–2003, 2008	Miami University	Oxford, Ohio	Active	
Urban	July 28, 1835 – 1839	New York University	New York, New York	Inactive	
**Columbia**	June 16, 1836 – 1840; May 18, 1881 – 1992	Columbia University	New York, New York	Withdrew	(Note: Withdrew to become a chapter of Alpha Delta Phi Society in 1992.)
**Yale**	June 1836–1873; January 27, 1888 – 1935, 1990	Yale University	New Haven, Connecticut	Active	
Amherst	September 18, 1836 – 1988; 2002–2006	Amherst College	Amherst, Massachusetts	Inactive	(Note: Originated as Iota Phi Kappa (local) in 1835.)
Brunonian	October 1836–1838; April 15, 1851 – 1992	Brown University	Providence, Rhode Island	Withdrew	(Note: Formed from the Kappa chapter of Beta Theta Pi in 1851, which had been installed three years earlier, in 1848.) (Note: Withdrew to become a chapter of the Alpha Delta Phi Society in 1992.)
Harvard	March 29, 1837–1865; February 3, 1879 – April 19, 1907	Harvard University	Cambridge, Massachusetts	Inactive	(Note: See the A.D. Club and the Fly Club.)
Cincinnati	1838–1840	Cincinnati Law School	Cincinnati, Ohio	Inactive	
Geneva	March 23, 1840 – May 1876; 1993–1996	Hobart College	Geneva, New York	Inactive	
Hudson	July 1, 1841 – 1852; 1855–1964	Case Western Reserve University	Cleveland, Ohio	Inactive	
Bowdoin	October 1841–1972, 1976–1993	Bowdoin College	Brunswick, Maine	Withdrew	(Note: Withdrew to become a chapter of the Alpha Delta Phi Society in 1993.)
Dartmouth	February 24, 1846 – 1969	Dartmouth College	Hanover, New Hampshire	Withdrew	(Note: Originated as Tau Delta Theta (local) in 1842.)
**Peninsular**	June 12, 1846 – 1851; 1964	University of Michigan	Ann Arbor, Michigan	Active	
Madison	1850–1851, 1964–1972	Colgate University	Hamilton, New York	Inactive	(Note: Note that the Madison chapter is at Colgate University in NY, while the Wisconsin chapter is at the University of Wisconsin-Madison. From 1846 to 1890, Colgate was named Madison University. Is there a connection to the Rochester chapter? The Colgate Wikipedia entry notes a schismatic group of trustees, students and faculty wanted to move the school to Rochester, and when disallowed by legal action they left to form their own school there.)
**Rochester**	December 1850	University of Rochester	Rochester, New York	Active	
**Alabama**	1850–1859, 2015	University of Alabama	Tuscaloosa, Alabama	Active	
Williams	July 1, 1851 – 1969	Williams College	Williamstown, Massachusetts	Inactive	(Note: Originated as the Zeta (Prime) chapter of Beta Theta Pi in 1847.) (Note: Greek letter organizations were banned at Williams in the mid-1960s.)
Manhattan	July 9, 1855 – May 15, 1913	City College of New York	New York, New York	Inactive	
Virginia	1855–1857, 1987–2003, 2010–2019	University of Virginia	Charlottesville, Virginia	Inactive	
**Middletown**	July 31, 1856 – 1992	Wesleyan University	Middletown, Connecticut	Withdrew	(Note: Originated as the Bertrian Society (local) in 1847.) (Note: Withdrew to become a chapter of the Alpha Delta Phi Society in 1992.)
Cumberland	December 1857–1861	Cumberland University	Lebanon, Tennessee	Inactive	(Note: The Cumberland chapter was initiated in December, 1857, and "recognized in 1859". With the impending Civil War it suspended active functions in 1861.)
**Kenyon**	November 14, 1858	Kenyon College	Gambier, Ohio	Active	
**Union**	June 14, 1859	Union College	Schenectady, New York	Active	(Note: Originated as the Fraternal Society (Alpha chapter) of Omicron Kappa Epsilon in 1833; its actives and a few alumni withdrew in 1858, anticipating a merger into a national fraternity. ΟΚΕ alumni who were disallowed from initiation into ΑΔΦ would go on to form a second chapter at Hope College, in Michigan, four years after Alpha's withdrawal. The Hope group remains an active local.)
Princeton	1863–1867	Princeton University	Princeton, New Jersey	Inactive	
**Cornell**	March 19, 1869	Cornell University	Ithaca, New York	Active	
**Phi Kappa**	December 20, 1877	Trinity College	Hartford, Connecticut	Active	(Note: Originated as Phi Kappa (local) in 1835; the chapter's designation honors that prior local.)
Johns Hopkins	May 6, 1889 – 1969; 1982–2018	Johns Hopkins University	Baltimore, Maryland	Inactive	(Note: Originated as Alpha Delta Epsilon (local) in 1888.)
**Minnesota**	February 22, 1892 – 1997; 2000	University of Minnesota	Minneapolis, Minnesota	Active	(Note: Originated as Alpha Delta Epsilon (local) in 1890.)
**Toronto**	June 10, 1893	University of Toronto	Toronto, Ontario, Canada	Active	
**Chicago**	March 20, 1896	University of Chicago	Chicago, Illinois	Active	(Note: Originated as the Lions Head Club (local) in 1894.)
**Memorial**	May 11, 1897	McGill University	Montreal, Quebec	Active	
**Wisconsin**	June 20, 1902 – 2018; 2021	University of Wisconsin–Madison	Madison, Wisconsin	Active	(Note: Originated as Phi Rho Beta (local) in 1897.)
**California**	August 15, 1908	University of California, Berkeley	Berkeley, California	Active	(Note: Originated as Phi Sigma Delta (local) in 1900.)
**Illinois**	January 13, 1912 – 2015; 2020	University of Illinois Urbana–Champaign	Champaign, Illinois	Active	(Note: Originated as Pi Theta (local) in 1903.)
**Stanford**	April 28, 1916 – 1992	Stanford University	Palo Alto, California	Withdrew	(Note: Withdrew to become a chapter of the Alpha Delta Phi Society in 1992.)
**Washington**	October 29, 1921	University of Washington	Seattle, Washington	Active	(Note: Originated as The Kalevala Club (local) in 1910.)
**British Columbia**	1926	University of British Columbia	Vancouver, British Columbia, Canada	Active	(Note: Originated as Phi Epsilon (local) in 1912.)
Northwestern	1939–1992	Northwestern University	Evanston, Illinois	Inactive	
Colby	1961–1969	Colby College	Waterville, Maine	Inactive	(Note: Originated as Sigma Theta Psi (local) in 1955.) (Note: Fraternities are banned at Colby, with the last fraternity chapters closing between 1984-86.)
Santa Barbara	1966–1971	University of California, Santa Barbara	Santa Barbara, California	Inactive	
Long Beach	1971–1974	California State University, Long Beach	Long Beach, California	Inactive	
**Lambda Phi**	1977–2023	Massachusetts Institute of Technology	Cambridge, Massachusetts	Withdrew	(Note: Originated as Lambda Phi (local) in 1906.) (Note: Withdrew to become a chapter of the Alpha Delta Phi Society in 2023)
Massachusetts	1981–2016	University of Massachusetts Amherst	Amherst, Massachusetts	Inactive	
Buffalo	1985–1999	University at Buffalo	Buffalo, New York	Inactive	
Great Lakes	1985–2001	Michigan State University	East Lansing, Michigan	Inactive	
**Adelpho**	1987	Chapman University	Orange, California	Active	
Western Ontario	1992–2001	University of Western Ontario	London, Ontario	Inactive	
Texas	1994–2002	University of Texas at Austin	Austin, Texas	Inactive	
**Nittany**	2007	Pennsylvania State University	State College, Pennsylvania	Active	
**Middlesex**	2007	Brandeis University	Waltham, Massachusetts	Active	
Nu Epsilon Zeta	2008––2018	Northeastern University	Boston, Massachusetts	Inactive	(Note: Originated as Nu Epsilon Zeta (local) in 1921.)
**Connecticut**	2010	University of Connecticut	Storrs, Connecticut	Active	(Note: Originated as Alpha Delta (local) in 2007.)
**Florida State**	2012	Florida State University	Tallahassee, Florida	Active	
**Maryland**	2012	University of Maryland, College Park	College Park, Maryland	Active	
Rutgers	2012–2021	Rutgers University	New Brunswick, New Jersey	Inactive	
**Delta Phi Alpha**	2013	Duke University	Durham, North Carolina	Active	
**Eliot**	2014	Washington University in St. Louis	St. Louis, Missouri	Active	
**Rocky Mountain**	2016	University of Colorado Boulder	Boulder, Colorado	Active	
