= Lion Club =

Social club

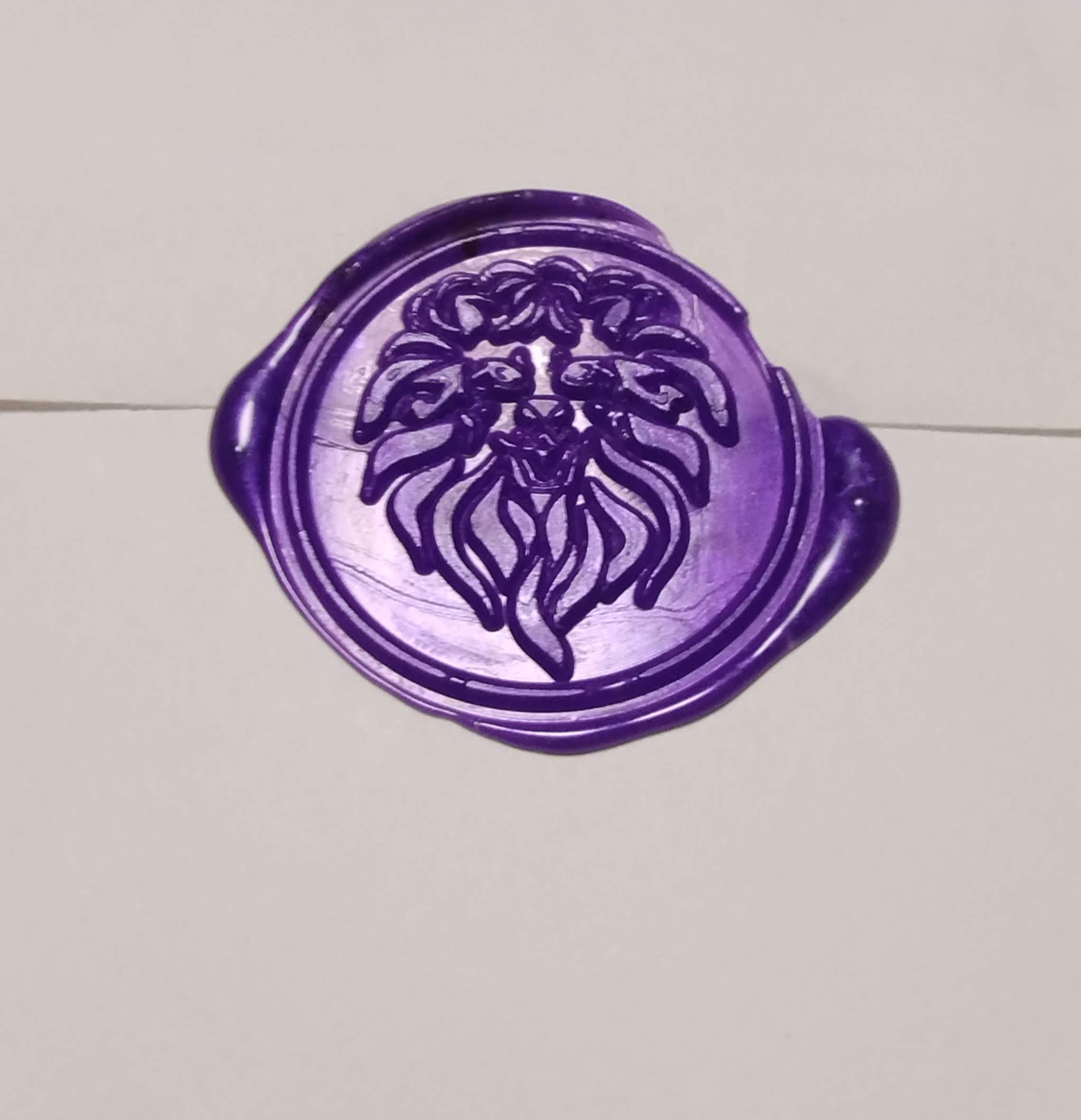
- Lion Club's signature wax seal
- Founded: 2016; 9 years ago Harvard University
- Type: Final club
- Affiliation: Independent
- Former affiliation: Sigma Alpha Epsilon (1893–c. 2016)
- Status: Active
- Scope: Local
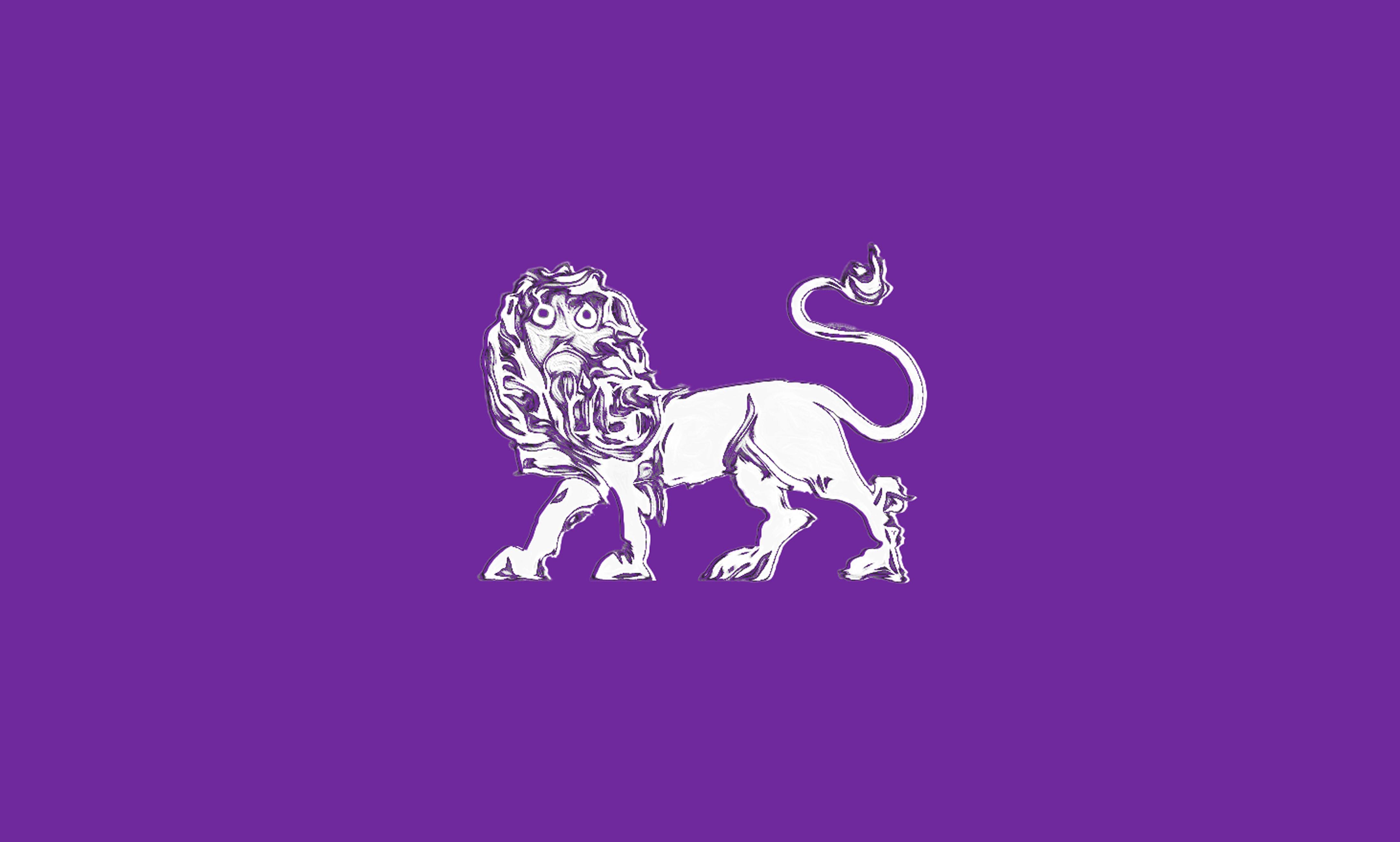
- Flag
- Mascot: Lion
- Chapters: 1
- Headquarters: Cambridge, Massachusetts; United States

The Lion Club is an all-male final club at Harvard University, sometimes referred to as The Lion. The club was originally founded in 1893 as a chapter of the Sigma Alpha Epsilon fraternity, and established finality (not allowing members to join other final clubs) following the COVID-19 pandemic.

== History ==
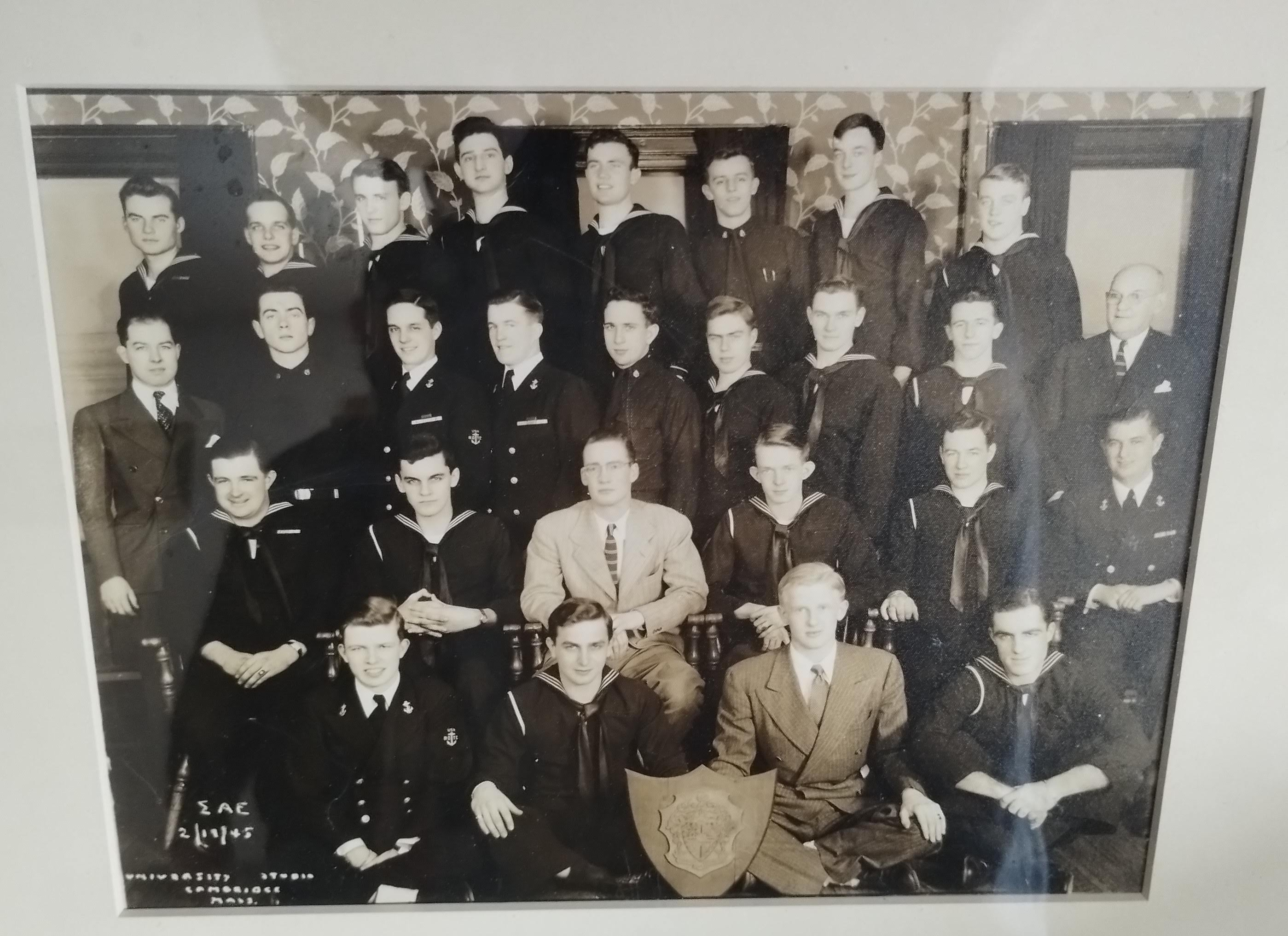
S.A.E. at University Studio in Cambridge, February 19, 1945

The Lion was originally founded as a Greek letter organization in 1893 by Harvard University students H. C. Buckminster and W. Brackett, gaining an official charter from the Sigma Alpha Epsilon fraternity as the Massachusetts Gamma chapter. Known as S.A.E., the group abided by the same rules imposed on the other final clubs on campus despite maintaining an active charter with a national fraternal organization.

For decades, the club occupied a space at 1326 Massachusetts Avenue, immediately next to the Porcellian Club, above what was then the Hayes-Bickford Cafeteria and is now Clover Food Labs. The club has since maintained a members-only lounge in Oak Square. Despite their continued connection with the national organization, The Harvard Crimson reported in 1953 that the S.A.E. Club maintained its own rules regarding discriminatory admissions and had "no race or religious restrictions."

Historically, the club operated as a "non-final" club, with some members of S.A.E. joining a separate final club. Following the COVID-19 pandemic, the club rebranded as the Lion and established finality with its membership. The club currently operates a traditional punch process for sophomore and junior men at the college.

== Notable members ==
- Jim Guy Tucker (1965) - 43rd Governor of Arkansas
