= Sab Club =

Final club at Harvard University, US

- Founded: 2002; 24 years ago Harvard University
- Type: Final club
- Affiliation: Independent
- Status: Active
- Scope: Local
- Chapters: 1
- Former name: Sablière Society (2002-2017)
- Headquarters: 1130 Massachusetts Avenue; Cambridge, Massachusetts 02138; United States

The Sab Club is a final club at Harvard University. It was founded in 2002 as an all-women's club and admitted its first class of men in 2017, becoming the first of Harvard's historically women's final clubs to adopt a gender-neutral membership policy.

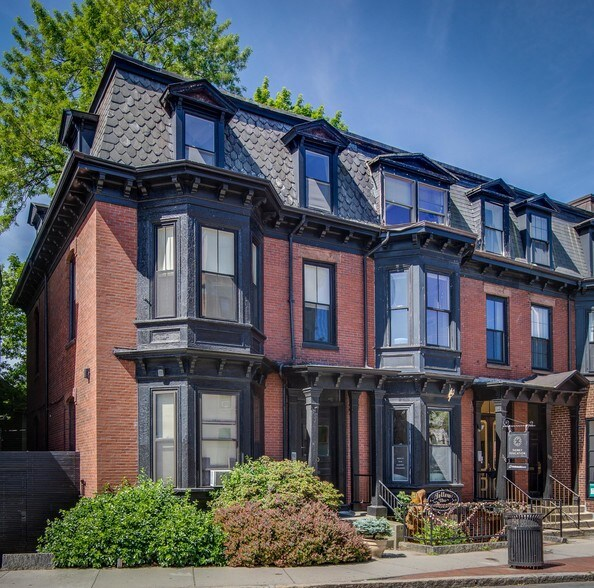
The Sab Club's clubhouse at 1130 Massachusetts Avenue in Cambridge, Massachusetts.

== History ==
=== Founding ===
The Sab Club was founded as the Sablière Society in 2002 at Harvard University in Cambridge, Massachusetts. Its founders were six juniors:

- Brooke L. Chavez
- Angie J. Thebaud
- Caroline L. Donchess
- Brittany J. Garza
- Maria S. Pedroza
- Eugenia B. Schraa

Originally all-female, the society was founded to provide a space for social gatherings that were more inclusive than the all-male clubs that dominated the campus at the time. Early activities, as described by Chavez, the society's first president, included "cocktails on the Common or wine at the MFA." The society was a final club that focused more on parties and exclusivity, rather than community service and charitable activities associated with sororities.

=== Transition to Gender-Neutral Membership ===
In 2015 and 2016, there was a push for final clubs and Greek letter organizations to become more diverse and coed, with the university threatening sanctions for members of single-sex clubs.

In September 2016, the society announced that it would transition to become gender-neutral, and in March 2017 the rebranded club inducted its first class of fourteen men through an abbreviated "punch" process. In doing so, it followed the Spee Club, which had been founded as an all-male club, as the second Harvard final club to adopt a gender-neutral membership policy, and became the first of the university's historically women's final clubs to admit men.

Club president Lulu S. Chua-Rubenfeld '18 characterized the decision as a reversal of a common pattern in the university's history, stating, "in so many times throughout Harvard's history it's been the men who have been opening up their spaces to women—even in the case of Harvard and Radcliffe. We think it's really empowering to be a women's space opening up our organization to non-women."

== Clubhouse ==
The Sab Club's clubhouse is located at 1130 Massachusetts Avenue in Cambridge. The clubhouse was constructed between 1869 and 1870 by James Robbins in the French second empire style. The Sab Club's clubhouse is a contributing property to the Harvard Square Historic District.

== Symbols ==
The Sablière Society was named for Madame Marguerite de la Sablière, a 17th-century woman and patron of the poet Jean de La Fontaine whose Paris home was a gathering place for intellectuals assosciated with the court of Louis XIV. The name was suggested by founding member Eugenia B. Schraa. The society's symbol was the swan and its color was light blue. In the spring of 2017, as part of its rebranding as the Sab Club, the society retired the swan and light blue in favor of a griffin and dark blue.

== Membership ==
Members are recruited during a highly selective process with Harvard's fifteen final clubs called "punching". The Sab Club has around thirty active members at a time.

== Notable alumni ==
- Hayley Barna – entrepreneur and venture capitalist; co-founder of Birchbox and the first female General Partner at First Round Capital
- Lizzie Durack – professional footballer; goalkeeper for Chelsea and a capped England international
- Briahna Joy Gray – attorney and political commentator; national press secretary for Bernie Sanders' 2020 presidential campaign
- Sierra Katow – stand-up comedian, actress, and television writer; competed on the ninth season of Last Comic Standing
- Jessica Lessin – journalist and media entrepreneur; founder and CEO of The Information
- Terah Lyons – technology policy expert; founding executive director of the Partnership on AI and Global Head of AI Policy at JPMorgan Chase
- Natalie Portman – Academy Award-winning actress, director, and film producer
- Gabby Thomas – Olympic track and field sprinter and three-time gold medalist at the 2024 Paris Summer Olympics
- Alexis Wilkinson – comedy writer for Veep and Brooklyn Nine-Nine; first Black woman elected president of The Harvard Lampoon

== See also ==
- Honor society
- Collegiate secret societies in North America
- Harvard College social clubs
