= Spee Club =

Social club at Harvard University

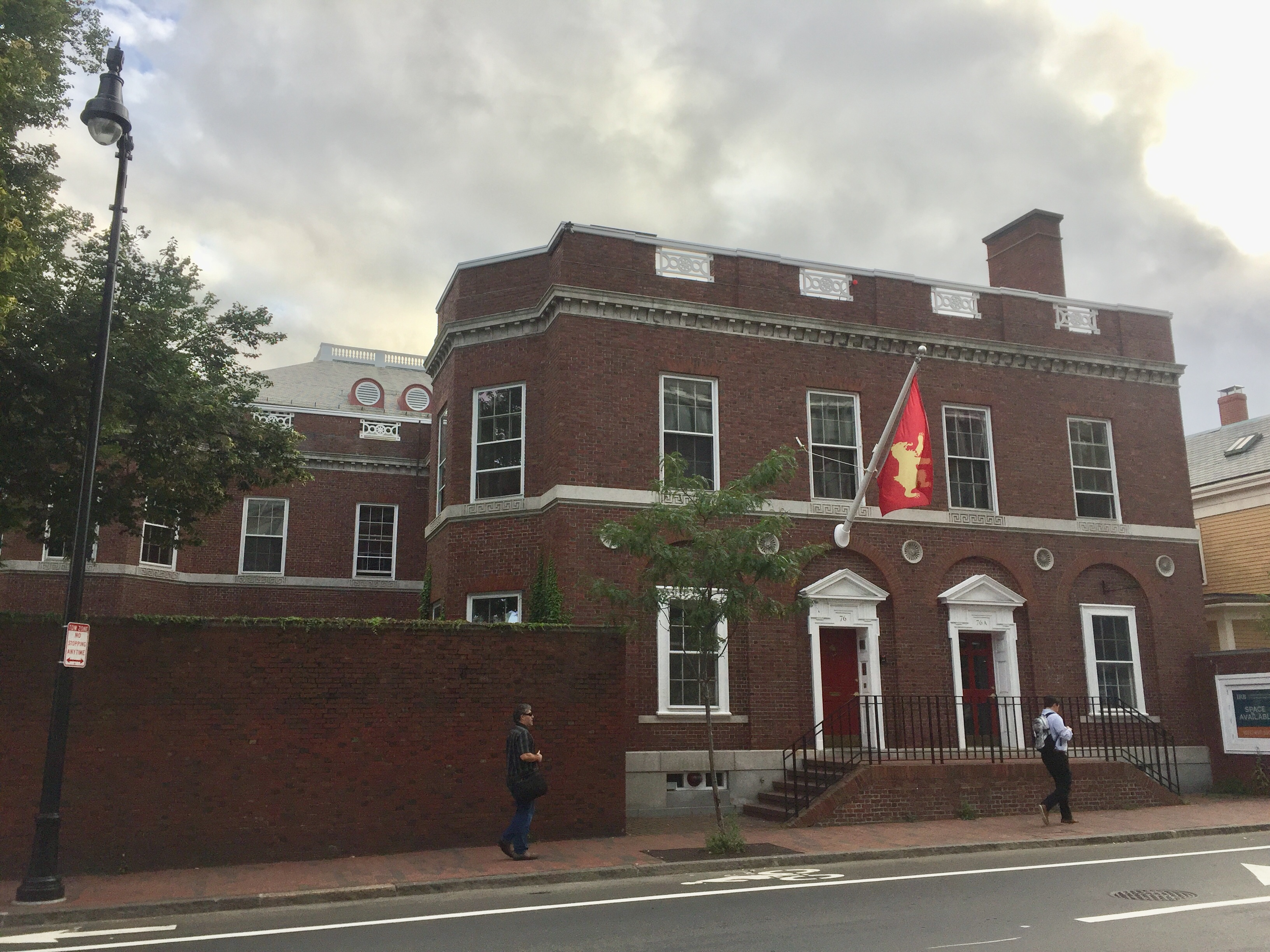
Spee Club clubhouse at 76 Mount Auburn St, Cambridge. Massachusetts. (2018 photo)

The Spee Club is a final club at Harvard University. After voting to adopt a gender-neutral membership policy in September 2015, the Spee Club became the first Harvard final club to admit members regardless of sex. The clubhouse is located at 76 Mount Auburn Street in Cambridge, Massachusetts

The club was originally founded in 1852 as the Harvard chapter of the Zeta Psi fraternity. After severing ties with the national fraternity in 1914, the club officially changed its name to the Spee Club of Harvard. In the fall of 1965, the club became the first Harvard final club to accept an African-American member. The club's mascot is a bear.

== History ==
=== Founding ===
The Spee Club was founded as the Eighth (or Rho) Chapter the Zeta Psi fraternity in 1852. Harvard Faculty abolished all secret societies in 1857, forcing the Chapter to go underground. In 1882, the chapter was reestablished and its constitution drafted. Ten years later, with tensions building between the University and its fraternities, the members of the chapter ceased payment of national dues, surrendered their charter, and voted themselves as the Zeta Psi Club of Harvard. In the spring of 1900, a unanimous vote brought the society into the final club fold, ultimately resulting in a formal name change in 1914 to the Spee Club of Harvard.

=== Clubhouse ===
The early quarters of the club were several rooms in a wooden house on Brattle Street. In the fall of 1886, the members purchased a second location at 44 Church Street, which became its first official clubhouse. Members describe its interior as a "simple, comfortable wooden house with a broad piazza overlooking the pear orchard and a stable nearby for the members' horses." As the club's presence grew, a third property was acquired and the members erected a building, designed by Guy Lowell, at 15 Holyoke Street.

==== Holyoke Street fire ====
On 9 March 1931, a large fire swept the building of the Holyoke Street clubhouse destroying the top floor banquet hall and key rooms in the building. Members recount the club's chef arriving to the clubhouse the next day and serving breakfast amidst the smoky partial ruins of the kitchen.

==== 76 Mount Auburn Street ====
After the Holyoke Street fire, the construction of a new clubhouse was commissioned by the club's undergraduates. With the University hoping to acquire the Holyoke Street lot to complete its holdings between Massachusetts Avenue and Mount Auburn Street, a trade was made and the Spee became the owner of a larger plot at 76 Mount Auburn Street. Part of the land was previously owned by the old Institute of 1770. The building was designed by William T. Aldrich, the architect renowned for the design of such buildings including the Colony Club, the Knickerbocker Club, the Marine Air Terminal, The Brook, the Union Club, and the Walters Art Museum. The opening dinner commemorating the unveiling of the new clubhouse was held on February 20, 1932. The Mount Auburn St location still serves as the Spee Club's clubhouse.

==== 76 Mount Auburn basement ====
For many years the basement of the Spee Club was the location of Schoenhof's Foreign Books. Its retail storefront closed on March 25, 2017, although it continues to do business through its Web site.

== Notable alumni ==
- William Franklin Draper – American painter and portraitist
- John F. Kennedy – 35th President of the United States
- Robert F. Kennedy – 64th Attorney General of the United States and later United States Senator from New York
- Douglas Kenney – American writer and co-founder of National Lampoon
- Henry Beard – American writer and co-founder of National Lampoon
- Joshua Kushner – American businessman and investor
- Peter Goelet Gerry – United States Senator from Rhode Island
- Peter Benchley – American author and screenwriter
- Norman D. Vaughan – American polar explorer
- Pierpont M. Hamilton – Brigadier General, Medal of Honor recipient
- Beekman Winthrop – Governor of Puerto Rico
- William Woodward Sr. – American banker and racehorse owner
- John W. Sears – Massachusetts politician
- Philip Roosevelt – World War I captain and banker
- Tweed Roosevelt – American businessman
- Jeff Hammerbacher – Data scientist
- Michael Mailer – Film director/producer

== See also ==
- Harvard College social clubs
