= Signet Society =

Arts society at Harvard University

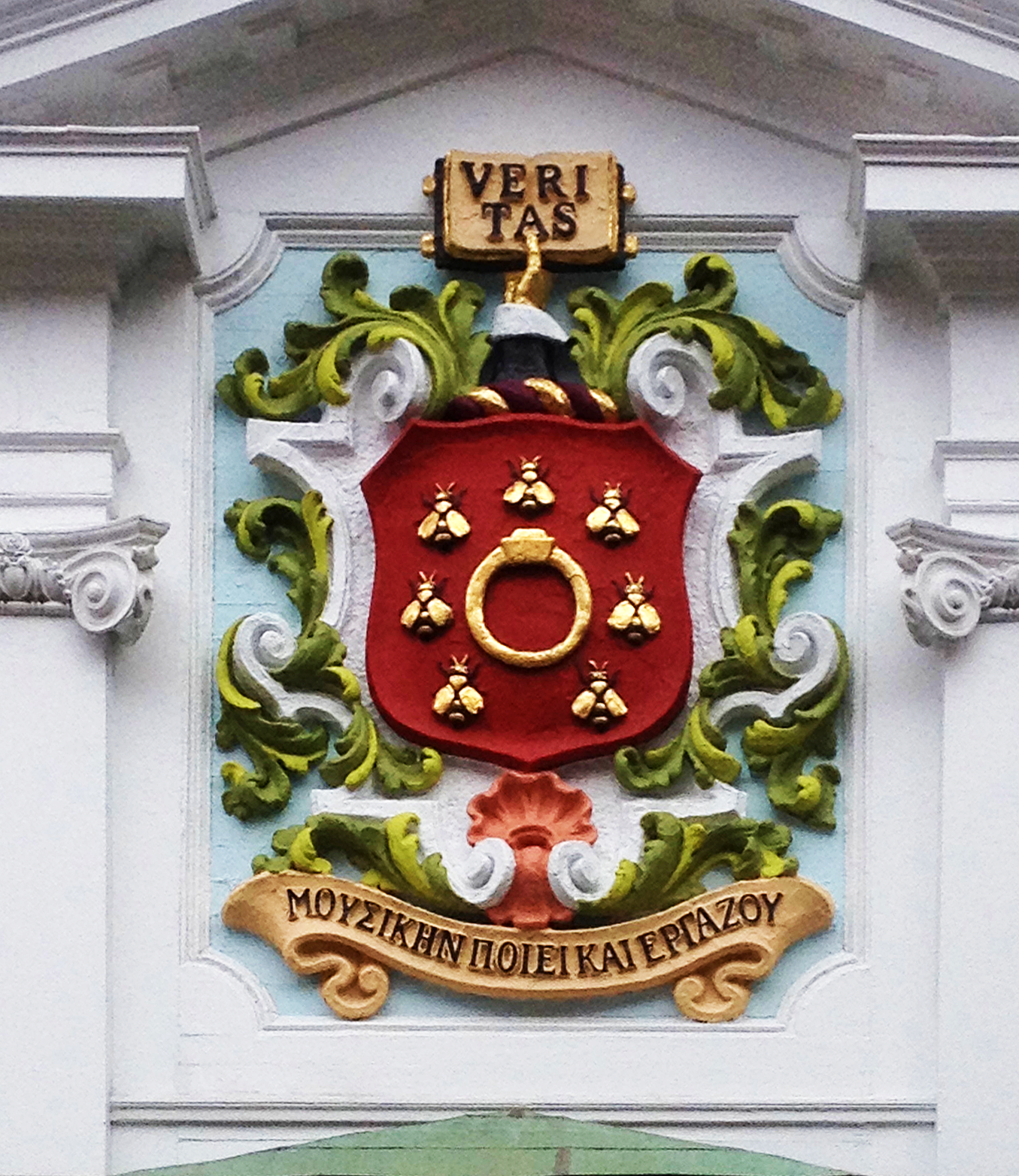
- Signet Society plaster cartouche by heraldic artist Pierre LaRose
- Founded: 1870; 156 years ago Harvard University
- Type: Literary
- Affiliation: Independent
- Status: Active
- Emphasis: Literature and art
- Scope: Local
- Motto: Sic vos non vobis Mellificatis apes "So do you bees make honey, not for yourselves"
- Colors: Gold and Black
- Flower: Red rose
- Chapters: 1
- Headquarters: 46 Dunster Street; Cambridge, Massachusetts 02138; United States
- Website: www.signetsociety.org

The Signet Society is an arts and letters club for Harvard College students and their mentors in creative fields, founded in 1870. The Signet celebrates a collective of artists across creative disciplines including film, literature, theater, dance, music, visual art, and architecture.

== History ==
The Signet Society was founded in 1870 by members of the class of 1871 at Harvard College in Boston, Massachusetts. The first president was Charles Joseph Bonaparte. It was, at first, dedicated to the production of literary work only, going so far as to exclude debate and even theatrical productions. According to The Harvard book

It seemed to the founders that there was room in the College world for another association that should devote itself more exclusively to literary work than is possible with large numbers. Accordingly, they confined the membership to a few and required that new members shall be, so far as possible, "representative men," and that at least five should be in the first half of their class.

To distinguish the Signet from other campus organizations, the founding members stated in the original charter that members would be chosen according to "merit and accomplishment." Today, those membership criteria are still present in the club's constitution mandating that members "shall be chosen about their intellectual, literary and artistic ability and achievements." While these criteria are central to the put-up process (admissions procedure), personal character is also considered. The Signet celebrates most of the arts, including music, the visual arts, and theater.

After a few years in quarters on university property, the Signet moved to an off-campus location at 46 Dunster Street.

== Symbols ==
The emblem of the Signet was, at one time, "a signet-ring enclosing a nettle," the signet-ring symbolizing unity and the nettle symbolizing impartiality. The emblem which appears over the door of the Signet includes a beehive and bees, and a legend in Ancient Greek: μουσικήν ποίει και εργάζου -- "Create art, and live it." Another motto of the Society is attributed to Virgil: Sic vos non vobis Mellificatis apes -- "So do you bees make honey, not for yourselves." From this comes the Society's tradition of referring to its undergraduate members as "drones." The society's colors are gold and black.

During Signet inductions, each new member receives a red rose. The rose is to be kept, dried and returned to the Signet Society upon the publication of the member's first substantial published work. The Signet maintains a library of these works, which were originally literary, but now include programs or other artifacts marking the performance of music, films, or displays of the visual artistry of members. Dried roses hang on the walls of the Signet near the works that occasioned their return. Particularly noteworthy is T. S. Eliot's rose, which hangs along with his original letter of acceptance to the society.

== Activities ==
Since 1910, the Signet has hosted an Annual Dinner honoring poets, authors, musicians, and social commentators. The Signet has a longstanding, reciprocal relationship with the Elizabethan Club, (or "The Lizzie") of Yale University. The two organizations sporadically hold a lawn croquet tournament, for which a handled and engraved silver pudding cup in a mahogany case serves as the trophy.

An alumni corporation administers the Signet's endowment, property, and staff. Since 2010, the Society has hosted Artists-in-Residence in a second-floor apartment.

== Membership ==
Any Harvard undergraduate student may apply for Signet membership. It admits both men and women without prejudice. Membership in Signet celebrates achievement in the arts, including music, the visual arts, and theater. Members are active in most undergraduate publications and organizations, including the Harvard Advocate, the Hasty Pudding Theatricals, the Harvard Crimson, the Harvard Lampoon, the Harvard Radcliffe Orchestra, and the Harvard Radcliffe Dramatic Club. Required dues are pro-rated by Harvard's financial aid calculations, allowing all members of the college community to be considered for membership. Harvard faculty and administrators have been and are Signet officers, associates, and members.

A select number of individuals working in the arts in the Cambridge community or wider Harvard community are elected to join Signet as part of The Signet Affiliates Program. These members include administrators, Harvard alumni, fellows, instructors, scholars, and visiting artists.

== Residence ==
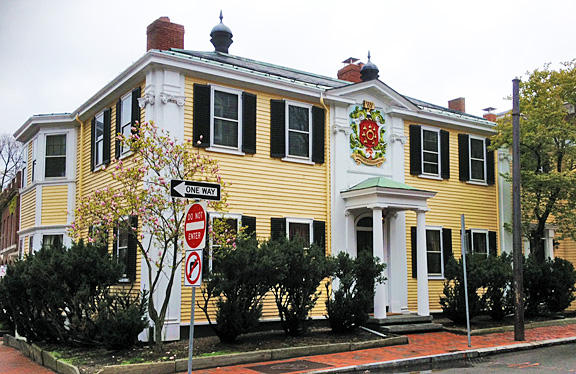
Signet Society, 46 Dunster Street. An 1820 Colonial residence, modified in 1880 into a Victorian clubhouse, then converted in 1902 by Cram, Goodhue & Ferguson into this Federalist structure.

The Signet Society's residence is located at 46 Dunster Street in Cambridge. Architectural historian Douglass Shand-Tucci includes an in-depth discussion of Signet's building in his history of Harvard's campus, relating the oddity that a firm known for its preeminence in Gothic Revival was employed to renovate an 1820s Colonial residence (converted in 1880 to a Victorian clubhouse) into a neo-Federal structure with baroque details. Regarding its distinctive features, Shand-Tucci writes:

It is in feeling wildly Baroque (of all things)—a welcome touch of flamboyance for what would otherwise have been a rather staid clubhouse for the Signet... the graphic quality of Cram & Goodhue's and LaRose's new frontispiece is actually rather reminiscent of book design (not to mention the Palladianism of several Tory Row mansions), and centers on a two story pedimented Ionic pavilion displaying the Signet arms... The design concept- cavalier enough, but very successful—discloses another guise of history-making in Harvard architecture: to restore the house, not as it originally was, but in LaRose's words, as it "ought to have been." Thus the architectural solecism of the two orders of the porch—the Doric columns and Ionic pilasters—was retained.

== Controversy ==
One of the Signet Society's "gravest mistakes" was their rejection of cellist Yo-Yo Ma while he was an undergraduate at Harvard.

== See also ==
- Harvard College social clubs
- Hasty Pudding Club
