= Owl Club (Harvard) =

Final club at Harvard University, US

Coordinates: 42.3715°N 71.1187°W

- Owl Club badge
- Founded: March 20, 1896; 130 years ago Harvard University
- Type: Honor
- Affiliation: Independent
- Status: Active
- Emphasis: Seniors
- Scope: Local
- Chapters: 1
- Members: 1,200+ active
- Former name: Phi Delta Psi Club
- Headquarters: 30 Holyoke Street; Cambridge, Massachusetts 02138; United States

The Owl Club is an all-male final club at Harvard University in Cambridge, Massachusetts, US. It was founded in 1896. It is regarded as one of the most socially active clubs on campus, known for its active membership and frequent hosted events.

== History ==
The Owl Club was founded at Harvard University on March 20, 1896 as the secret society Alpha Epsilon, Greek for Pipe and Mug. In 1897, the group changed its name to Phi Delta Psi Club and was no longer a secret society.

The club held meetings in Cambridge's Polo Club Alley before purchasing land to build a clubhouse on the corner of Holyoke Street and Holyoke Place in 1901. The house was first occupied in 1905.

In 1916, Phi Delta Psi Club voted to change its name to Owl Club.

It had initiated more than 1,200 members.

== Symbols ==
The club become known as The Owl as an abbreviation of its Greek name, Ἀυλὸς χαὶ Ἔκπωμα.

The club's tie is black with green owls and is worn to weekly dinners and formal events.

The club hosts an annual New York Dinner attended by over 100 alumni.

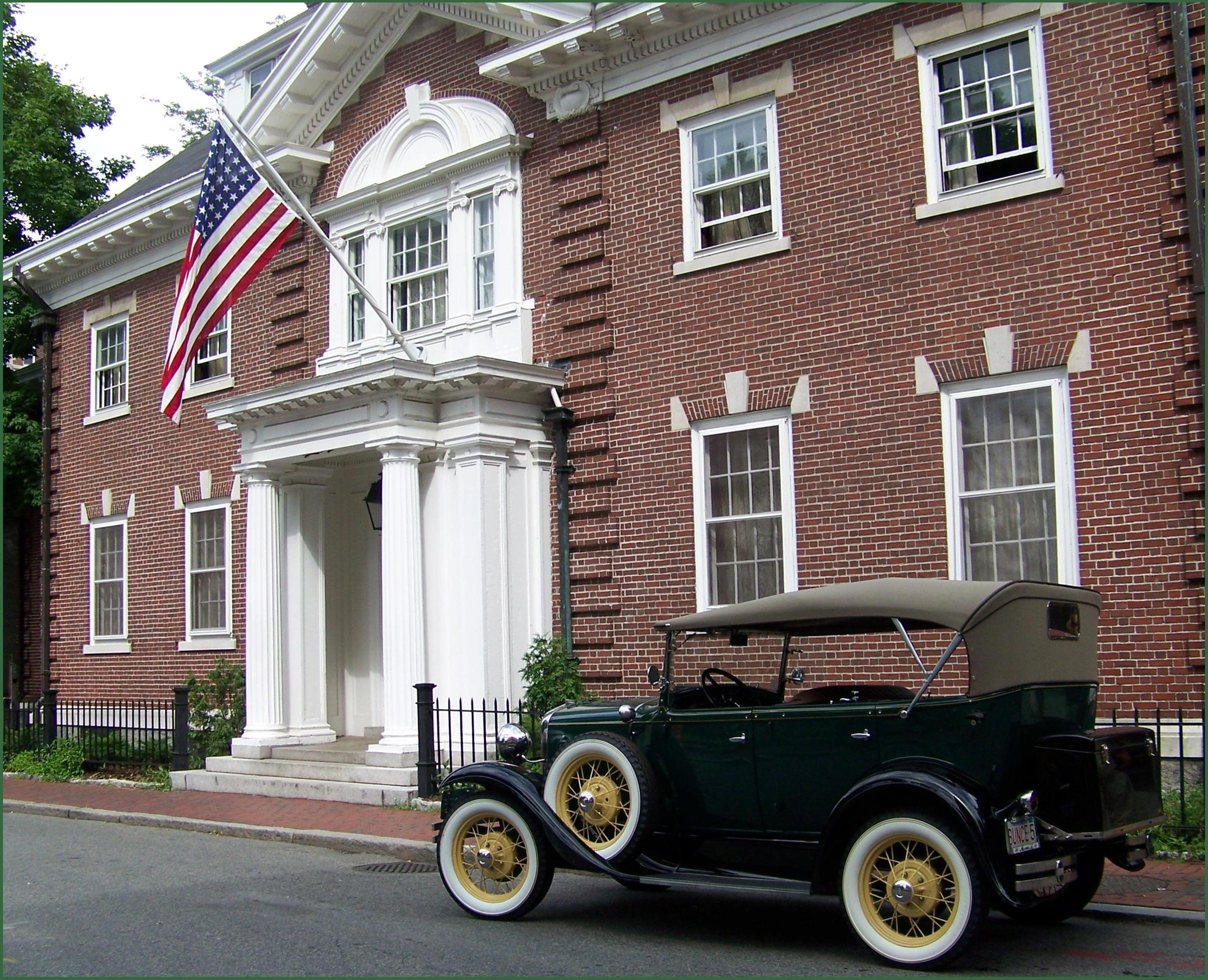
Owl Club house

== Clubhouse ==
In 1905, architect James Purdon of Purdon & Little drew designed the Georgian revival style clubhouse. On June 24, 1905, its cornerstone was laid. The new building was formally opened on March 24, 1906, the tenth anniversary of the Club. This house at 30 Holyoke Street is the current clubhouse.

== See also ==
- Honor society
- Collegiate secret societies in North America
- Harvard College social clubs
