= Lincoln's Inn Society =

Student club at Harvard Law School

- Founded: 1907; 119 years ago Harvard Law School
- Type: Social club
- Former affiliation: Phi Delta Phi; HL Central
- Status: Merged
- Emphasis: Law
- Scope: Local
- Chapters: 1
- Members: 3,200+ lifetime
- Headquarters: 44 Follen Street; Cambridge, Massachusetts; United States

Lincoln's Inn Society was a social club based at Harvard Law School, in Cambridge, Massachusetts. It was originally known as Choate Inn of the Phi Delta Phi. It became a private club when the Harvard faculty voted to ban all fraternities in 1907. Lincoln's Inn Society merged with HL Central in 2007, following declining membership and a lack of funds.

== History ==
The Lincoln's Inn Society was founded in 1907 by three Harvard Law School students who hoped to find a social organization to provide some relief from the stress of law school. It was originally the Choate Inn of Phi Delta Phi, a legal fraternity that calls its chapters "inns".

Lincoln's Inn became a private club when the Harvard faculty voted to ban all fraternities in 1907. The Inn was a student-run and student-owned club, operating beyond university regulation. Lincoln's Inn membership was originally male only but later admitted women.

The society was originally a dinner club and eventually operated as a social and drinking club. The Inn's flagship event was the annual Winter Dinner, a tradition started around 1918. By 1991, some alumni noted that the drinking club was a "defacto speakeasy", bearing similarities to the film Animal House.

By 2006, the society's membership had declined, including only fifty students instead of the usual 100 members. As a result, the society was challenged to maintain its house, opting to close its doors to reevaluate its financial status.

In March 2007, Lincoln's Inn Society merged with HL Central, a for-profit organization formed in 1999. However, the society announced that this was only for administrative purposes. Plans were to renovate the society's house and reopen it; however, it was close to foreclosure in 2009 and was sold for $1.1 million. Following this, the society ceased to operate. The Lincoln's Inn Society initiated some 3,200 members throughout its history.

== Symbols ==
The Lincoln Inn's was named for the Lincoln's Inn in London, which is one of the four Inns of Court where English barristers are based.

== Property ==
The Inn's house was a historic three-story Victorian house across the street from the Law School campus at 44 Follen Street. It was in the architectural style of Charles Addams. The society purchased the house in 1947. It was sold in 2009.

== Notable members ==
=== Academia ===
- Roger Fisher '48 — Professor at Harvard Law School, Author of "Getting to Yes"
- John H. Langbein '68 — Professor at Yale Law School
- Charles Nesson '63 — Professor at Harvard Law School

=== Business ===
- Victor F. Ganzi '71 — President and CEO of the Hearst Corporation
- Laurance Rockefeller — Financier and philanthropist

=== Judiciary ===
- William J. Brennan Jr. — Associate Justice of the Supreme Court
- Stephen Breyer '64 — Associate Justice of the Supreme Court
- Neil Gorsuch — Associate Justice of the Supreme Court
- Anthony Kennedy '61 — Associate Justice of the Supreme Court
- Laurence Silberman '61 – Senior Judge, United States Court of Appeals for the District of Columbia Circuit
- David Souter '66 — Associate Justice of the Supreme Court

=== Law ===
- Robert Joffe '67 — Former Presiding Partner of Cravath Swaine & Moore

=== Politics ===
- Joseph Califano '55 — Former U.S. Secretary of Health, Education, and Welfare
- Jim Cooper '80 — U.S. Congressman from Tennessee
- Bob Graham '62 — Former U.S. Senator from Florida
- Ken Mehlman '91 — Chairman of the Republican National Committee
- Larry Pressler '71 — Former U.S. Senator from South Dakota
- Clark T. Randt Jr. '74 — U.S. Ambassador to China
- Jack Reed '82 — U.S. Senator from Rhode Island
- Pat Schroeder — United States House of Representatives
- Ted Stevens '50 — U.S. Senator from Alaska
- Bill Weld — 68th Governor of Massachusetts

== See also ==
- Harvard College social clubs
- Professional fraternities and sororities
- List of social fraternities
