= Fox Club =

Harvard College final club

Coordinates: 42°22′20.5″N 71°7′12.3″W

- F
- Founded: 1898; 128 years ago Harvard University
- Type: Final club
- Affiliation: Independent
- Status: Active
- Scope: Local
- Chapters: 1
- Nickname: The Fox
- Headquarters: 44 John F. Kennedy Street; Cambridge, Massachusetts; United States
- Website: www.44jfk.com

The Fox Club is a private all-male final club of Harvard undergraduate students founded in 1898. The Fox Club is not officially affiliated with Harvard University. It is located on John F. Kennedy Street in Harvard Square.

== History ==
The Fox Club was founded in 1898 by six undergraduate students at Harvard University. It is an all-male final club. Originally known as the Digamma Club, the name Fox and the club's symbol, a fox carrying the letter "F", grew from the similarity between the letter "F" and the archaic Greek character for "digamma", which primarily signifies the number 6.

Harvard attempted to impose sanctions against members of single-gender final clubs, preventing members from holding student group leadership positions, serving as varsity athletic team captains, and from having fellowships endorsed by the college. However, after acknowledging that this policy against final clubs violated federal law, Harvard rescinded all sanctions in 2019.

In 2015, the Fox Club was one of the first of Harvard's final clubs to contemplate admitting women, but only on a provisional basis by the club's undergraduate board. In an August 2015 vote by the club's undergraduate members, nine women were given provisional membership. This vote was taken without input from the club's graduate members who revoked the nine women's provisional membership.

In May 2019, The Harvard Crimson reported that a vote of all Fox Club graduate members had failed to reach the two-thirds affirmative majority necessary to change membership policies.

== Symbols ==
The club's nickname is the Fox. Its symbol is an upright fox carrying the letter "F".

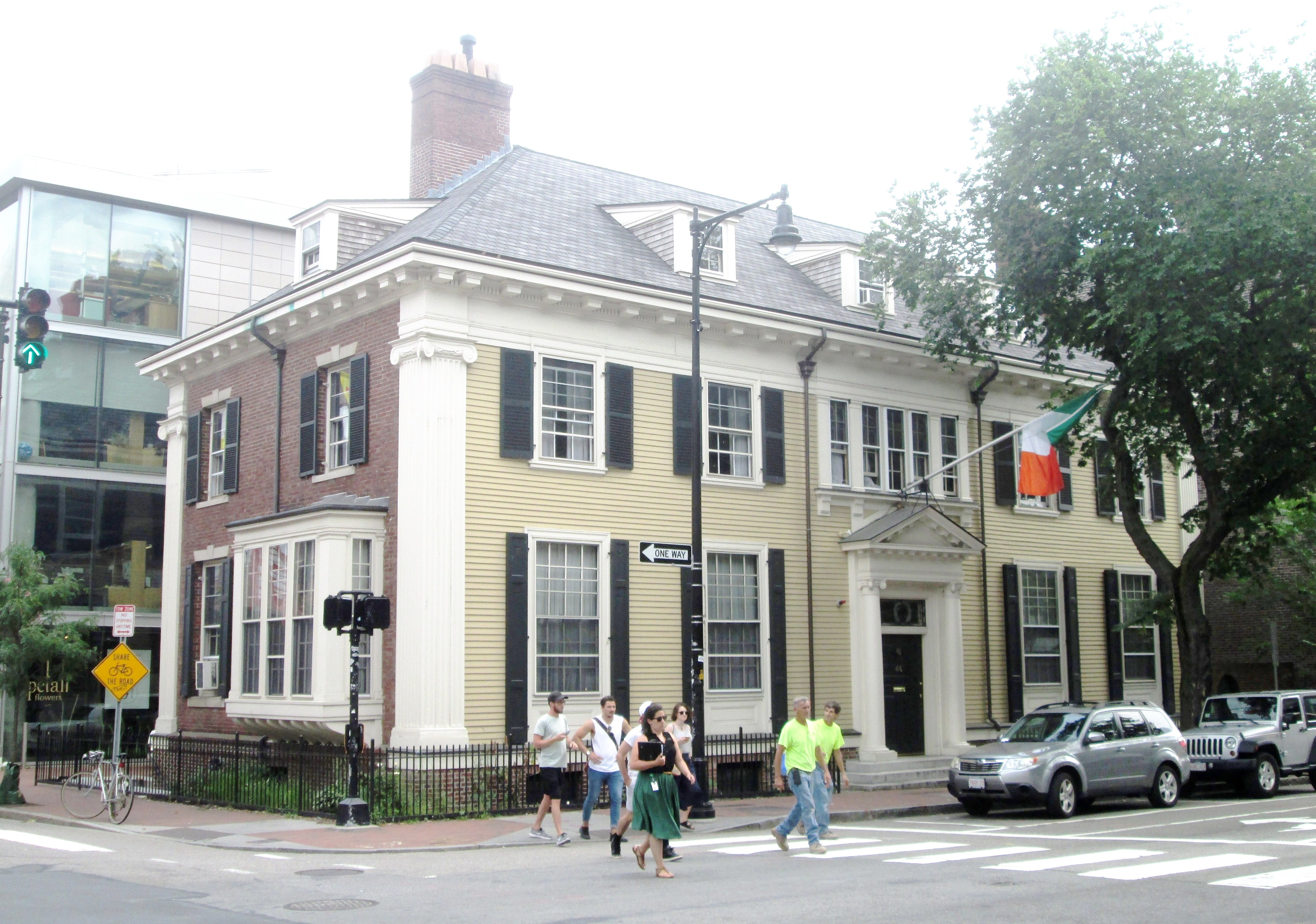
Fox Club, 44 John F. Kennedy Street, Cambridge, Massachusetts

== Club house ==
The Fox Club house is located on 44 John F. Kennedy Street in Cambridge, Massachusetts. It was built in 1902 and designed by Guy Lowell, a prominent American architect who also designed the Museum of Fine Arts in Boston. The Fox Club house is a contributing structure in the Harvard Square National Historic District and in the local Harvard Square Conservation District.

== Notable members ==
=== Business and finance ===
- Steve Ballmer, former chief executive officer of Microsoft
- Bill Gates, co-founder of Microsoft and co-chair of the Bill & Melinda Gates Foundation
- Royal Little, founder of Textron
- Colman M. Mockler Jr., chairman and CEO of Gillette
- Manuel Elizalde Jr., Filipino businessman and government official
- Jaime Zobel de Ayala, chairman of the Ayala Corporation and Philippine ambassador to the United Kingdom

=== Politics, government and law ===
- J. Sinclair Armstrong, chairman of the U.S. Securities and Exchange Commission
- Birendra of Nepal, King of Nepal from 1972 to 2001
- Daniel Arrigg Koh, U.S. House Representative for Massachusetts's 6th congressional district
- William Richards Castle Jr., founder of the Fox Club, Under Secretary of State and U.S. ambassador to Japan
- Henry Cabot Lodge Jr., U.S. Senate and U.S. ambassador to the United Nations, South Vietnam, West Germany, and the Holy See
- John Davis Lodge, 79th governor of Connecticut, U.S. House of Representatives, and U.S. ambassador to Spain, Argentina, and Switzerland
- David E. McGiffert, Under Secretary of the Army and Assistant Secretary of Defense for International Security Affairs
- Thomas M. T. Niles, U.S. ambassador to Canada, the European Union and Greece
- Sinclair Weeks, U.S. Senator and 13th U.S. Secretary of Commerce

=== Literature, publishing and the arts ===
- Edward Larrabee Barnes, architect
- Van Wyck Brooks, Pulitzer Prize-winning historian, literary critic, and biographer
- T. S. Eliot, essayist, publisher, playwright, literary and social critic
- Hermann Hagedorn, American author, poet, and biographer
- Maxwell Perkins, literary editor and publisher who gave writers Ernest Hemingway and F. Scott Fitzgerald their start.
- Fernando Zóbel de Ayala y Montojo, painter

=== Journalism and broadcasting ===
- Arthur Windsor "Nick" Arundel, journalist and Marine Corps officer in the Korean War
- Henry Loomis, director of the Voice of America and president of the Corporation for Public Broadcasting
- Thomas Winship, editor of The Boston Globe

=== Sports ===
- Paul Withington, college football coach
- Tom Woods, All-American guard
- Paul Wylie, figure skater and the 1992 Olympic silver medalist in men's singles skating.

=== Other ===
- Hunt Wentworth, Chicago society figure and president of The Harvard Lampoon; president of the Fox Club, 1916–17

== See also ==
- Harvard College social clubs
