= A.D. Club =

Final club at Harvard University, US

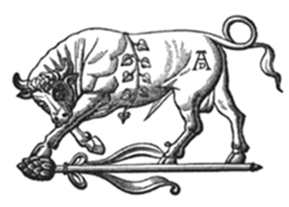
- Founded: 1865; 161 years ago Harvard University
- Type: Final club
- Affiliation: Independent
- Former affiliation: Alpha Delta Phi
- Status: Active
- Scope: Local
- Motto: Aut Bibat Aut Abeat "Either Drink or Leave"
- Chapters: 1
- Headquarters: 1 Plympton Street; Cambridge, Massachusetts; United States
- Website: www.oneplymptonpreservation.org

The A.D. Club is a collegiate final club at Harvard University in Cambridge, Massachusetts. It was established in 1836 as a chapter of Alpha Delta Phi fraternity. It withdrew from the fraternity in 1865, changing its name to the A.D. Club.

== History ==
=== Alpha Delta Phi ===
The A.D. Club originated at Harvard University in Cambridge, Massachusetts in 1836 as Alpha Delta Phi fraternity. It was founded by editors of the college's monthly literary magazine. It was considered an honorary chapter, with its members having honorary membership to other chapters, because Harvard did not allow secret societies on campus at that time. Its founding members were John Bacon, William Augustus Davis, John Fenwick Eustis, Horatio Emmons Hale, Charles Hayward, Samuel Tenney Hildreth, Charles Stearns Wheeler, and Henry Williams.

In 1846, the faculty allowed the fraternity to have a regular chapter on campus. However, the chapter was abolished in 1857 and had to operate sub rosa. The chapter had no new members in the class of 1859. At that time, the chapter decided to change its name to Haidee, pretending to be a club named after a college boat.

=== A.D. Club ===
Finally conceding to the university's anti-secret society stance, the chapter surrendered its charter in 1865 and became a non-secret society called the A.D. Club. (Note: The A.D. Club history says the fraternity charter was surrendered, while Baird's Manual says it was withdrawn. The fraternity chapter was reestablished at Harvard from 1887 to 1907, withdrawing to form Fly Club, another final club. This was not related to the A.D. Club.) A.D. Club is a final club, meaning that its members cannot join any other similar club. It is an all-male society. The club's officers include president, vice president, secretary, treasurer, custode, and librarian. After the Porcellian Club, it has been considered the most socially prominent of the final clubs at Harvard.

On February 13, 1917, The A.D. Club of Harvard College was incorporated as a trust. On May 2, 2021, it reorganized as a nonprofit corporation, A.D. Club, Inc. In addition, the One Plympton Preservation Foundation, a nonprofit organization, oversees the care of the A.D. Club's historic house. These various organizations are headquartered at 1 Plympton Street in Cambridge, Massachusetts.

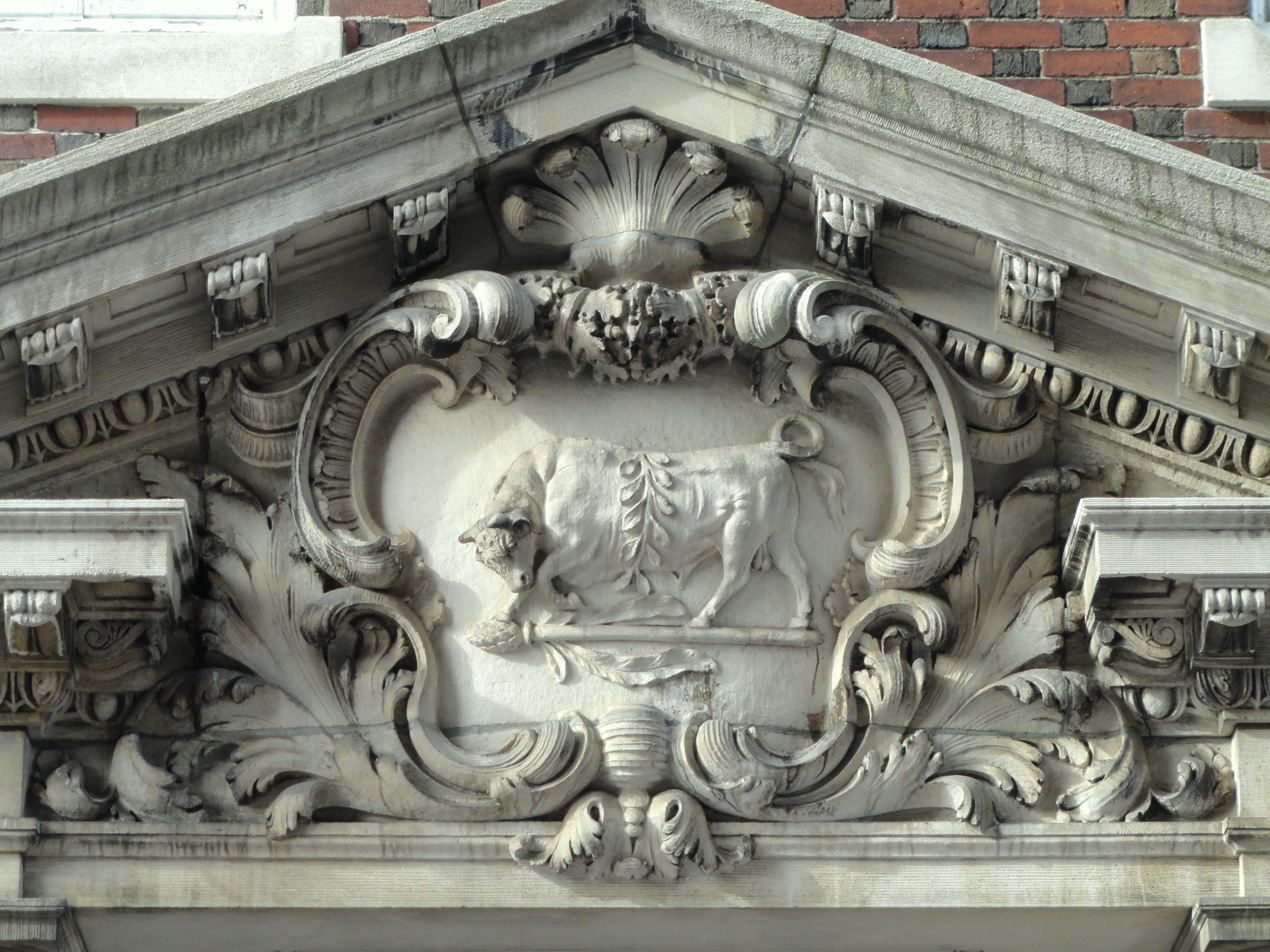
Clubhouse entryway, featuring its bull and sword symbol

== Symbols ==
The A.D. Club's symbol is a bull on a sword. This symbol is carved in stone over the entrance to the society's clubhouse. It is also on the A.D. Club's china, manufactured by Wedgewood. It is also used on early 19th-century club medals, along with the motto Aut Bibat Aut Abeat that translates to "Either Drink or Leave".

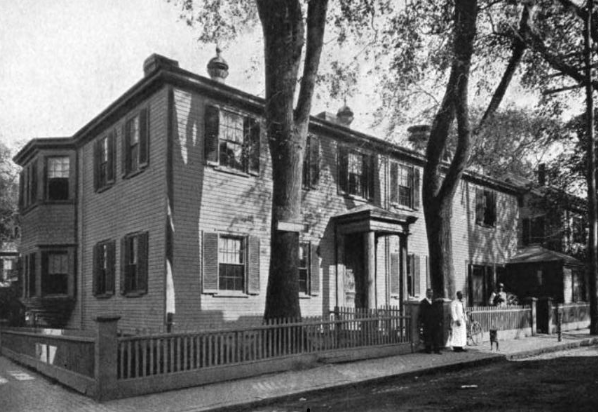
Former clubhouse, Mt. Auburn and Dunster Streets in 1906

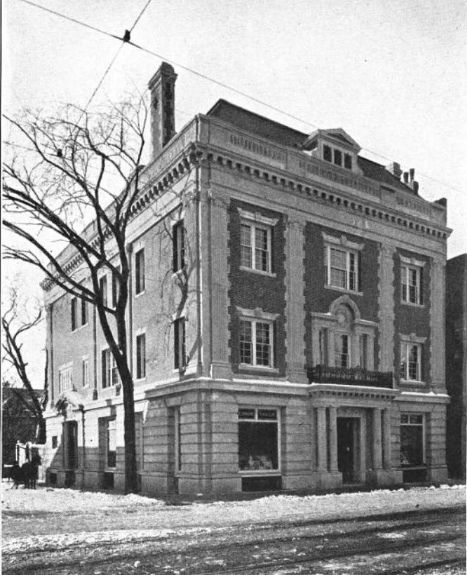
Current clubhouse on Plympton Street in 1906

== Clubhouse ==
Before 1872, the A.D. Club rented rooms in the upper story of a brick house on Palmer Street in Cambridge, Massachusetts. In 1873, it moved to a building on Brattle Street. In September 1878, the club leased a house on the corner of Mt. Auburn and Dunster Streets; later, alumni raised funds to purchase the property.

In April 1899, the club purchased the property from the Helen Niles estate, at the corner of Plympton Street and Massachusetts Avenue in Cambridge. There, construction began on a new clubhouse in May 1900. In September 1900, the club moved to its present clubhouse at 1 Plympton Street. The club occupied the top two stories of the brick and stone building and rented the first floor to a music store and a tailor's shop.

A fire started on the first floor of the building on January 18, 1902, causing smoke damage to the club's quarters. In April 1926, there was another fire, requiring $1,000 in repairs. In 2020, the A.D. Club's house was valued at $7,208,500.

== Membership ==
The A.D. Club's members are male students who typically join during their sophomore year. In 2015, the A.D. Club decided to remain all-male, despite pressure from the university to go co-educational.

Members are recruited during Punch, a six-week-long process for all of Harvard's final clubs that takes place annually from October to early December. A.D. Club membership had traditionally been by invitation only. The club held its first open Punch in the fall of 2017, in response to the university's criticism of final clubs' exclusivity. This allows any male student to attend A.D. Club's Punch events and possibly gain membership into the club.

== Notable members ==
Notable members of the A.D. Club include:

- Charles Francis Adams Jr. – president of the Union Pacific Railroad
- Charles Francis Adams III – United States Secretary of the Navy
- Charles Francis Adams IV – electronics industrialist
- Craig Adams – professional ice hockey player
- Larz Anderson – diplomat and U.S. Ambassador to Japan
- Robert Bacon – United States Secretary of State and U.S. Ambassador to France
- James Blake – professional tennis player
- Benjamin C. Bradlee – executive editor of The Washington Post
- Phillips Brooks – Bishop of Massachusetts and author
- Michael Temple Canfield – American diplomatic aide
- Russell S. Codman Jr. – real estate executive and commissioner of the Boston Fire Department
- Charles William Eliot – president of Harvard University
- Manning Ferguson Force – justice of the Superior Court of Cincinnati and recipient of the Medal of Honor
- Charles Edward Grinnell – clergyman, lawyer, and writer
- Edward Everett Hale – author, historian, and Unitarian minister
- Horatio Emmons Hale – ethnologist and philologist
- William Randolph Hearst – United States House of Representatives, newspaper publisher, and founder of Hearst Communications
- Henry Lee Higginson – businessman and philanthropist, founder of Boston Symphony Orchestra
- Oliver Wendell Holmes Jr. – Influential associate justice of the U.S. Supreme Court
- Arthur A. Houghton Jr. – president of Steuben Glass Works, the Metropolitan Museum of Art and the New York Philharmonic
- Amo Houghton Jr. – United States House of Representatives
- David McKendree Key – United States Ambassador to Burma and Assistant Secretary of State for International Organization Affairs
- Samuel Longfellow – clergyman and hymn writer
- James Russell Lowell – U.S. Ambassador to Spain, U.S. Ambassador to the Court of St. James's, poet, and Harvard professor
- J. Harleston Parker – architect
- Stephen Henry Phillips – Attorney General of Massachusetts and the Kingdom of Hawaii and Minister of Foreign Affairs and on King Kamehameha V's Privy Council
- Frederick H. Rindge – business magnate and founder of Malibu, California
- Stephen Minot Weld – schoolmaster and member of the Massachusetts Governor's Council
- Charles Stearns Wheeler – farmer and Transcendentalist pioneer
- Mark Carney – Prime Minister of Canada

== See also ==
- Collegiate secret societies in North America
- Harvard College social clubs
- List of Alpha Delta Phi chapters
