= Fly Club =

Final club at Harvard College, US

- Founded: 1836; 190 years ago Harvard College
- Type: Final club
- Affiliation: Independent
- Former affiliation: Alpha Delta Phi
- Status: Active
- Scope: Local
- Motto: Duraturis Haud Duris Vinculi "Bonds should be lasting, not chafing or hard"
- Symbol: Leopard rampant gardant
- Chapters: 1
- Nickname: Fly
- Headquarters: Two Holyoke Place; Cambridge, Massachusetts 02138; United States

The Fly Club is a final club at Harvard College in Cambridge, Massachusetts. It was established in 1836 and operated as a chapter of Alpha Delta Phi before becoming a local organization in 1906.

== History ==
Fly Club was founded in 1836 at Harvard College as a literary society by the editors of Harvardiana. Its founding members were John Bacon, William Augustus Davis, John Fenwick Eustis, Horatio Hale, Nathan Hale, Charles Hayward, Samuel Tenney Hildreth, Rufus King, George Warren Lippitt, James Russell Lowell, Charles Woodman Scates, Charles Stearns Wheeler, and Henry Williams.

The club was granted a charter by the Alpha Delta Phi fraternity on March 29, 1837. It remained active until surrendering its charter in 1865, continuing on as the local A.D. Club With the graduation of the members of the class of 1868, the club was discontinued. In 1878, graduate members Edward Everett Hale (class of 1839) and Phillips Brooks (class of 1855), initiated undergraduates from the class of 1879. This restored the Harvard chapter of Alpha Delta Phi.

In December 1906, the fraternity's charter was once again surrendered with the group continuing as a local fraternity. In January 1910, the organization officially adopted the name "Fly Club," its unofficial title since 1885.

Fly Club admitted its first African American members in the 1970s. In 1996, the Fly Club merged with the D.U. Club or Delta Upsilon, another final club, and the combined entity retained the name Fly Club. Although the merged included the alumni of the 116 year old D.U. Club, it did not include its active members.

== Symbols ==
Fly Club Medallion of Oliver Wendell Holmes Jr.

The club's name was derived by combining the "PH" from "Alpha," the "l" from "Delta," and the "i" from "Phi," to get "Phli," pronounced "Fly". Its nickname is the "Fly".

The club motto, suggested by Prof. Morris H. Morgan (class of 1881) and adopted Feb. 1902, reads Duraturis Haud Duris Vinculis, an ablative absolute construction translated as "Bonds should be lasting, not chafing or hard."

The original crest of the club bore the Alpha Delta Phi star and crescent, later changing to the leopard rampant.

=== Fly Club Gate ===
The Fly Club Gate is located along the exterior of Winthrop House. An English Baroque structure, the gate was built in 1914 by a grant from members of the Fly Club. The Fly's symbol, a "leopard rampant gardant" (known as the "Kitty"), is centered within the ironwork above the entry. Inscribed below is a dedication: "For Friendships Made in College the Fly Club in Gratitude has Built this Gate."

== Clubhouse ==
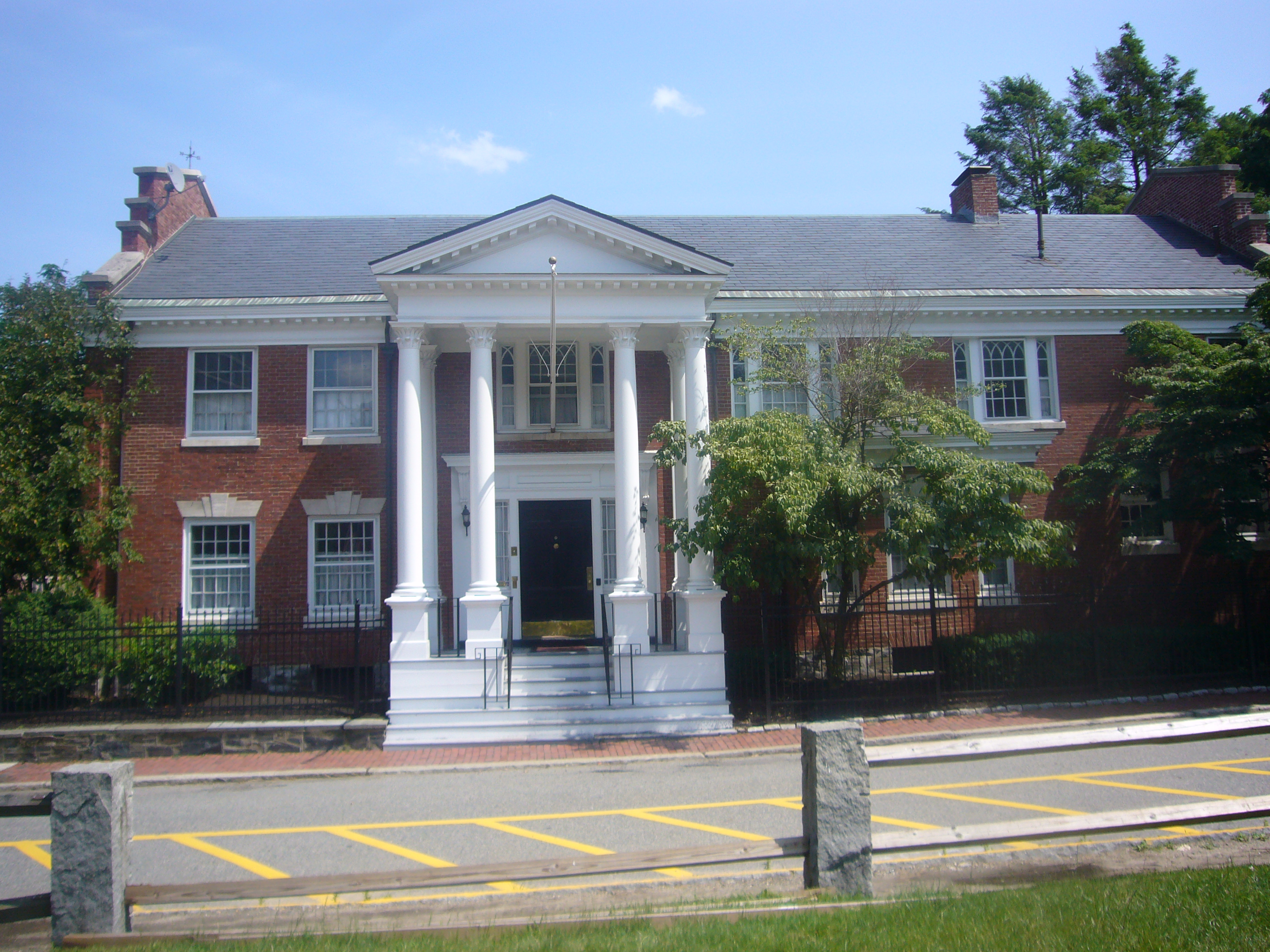
Fly Club's clubhouse

The Fly clubhouse is located at Two Holyoke Place, near Harvard Square, along the "Gold Coast" of formerly private residences. The Fly sits in front of Harvard's Lowell House (1930), across Mt. Auburn Street from the Harvard Lampoon building (1909). It was constructed by the club in 1896. Its brick facade added in 1902.

The Fly also owns the property at 45 Dunster Street, which is currently leased to the Hasty Pudding Club and restaurant Dig Inn.

In 2020, the Fly Club’s property holdings were valued at a combined $10,384,000, more than any other Harvard final club.

== Membership ==
The Fly Club is a final club, traditionally "punching" or inviting male undergraduates of Harvard College during their sophomore or junior year. Its membership is all male.

== Controversies ==
Lisa Schkolnick, a Harvard student, sued the Fly Club for discrimination of women in 1987; however, a Massachusetts court ruled that it lacked jurisdiction over private organizations such as the Fly Club. In September 1993, the all-male club voted to admit women, but delayed punching women that year and reversed the decision in 1994. However, this decision means that Fly Club became subject to university sanctions that prohibit members' access to some campus privileges, such as leadership positions, athletic captaincies, and some fellowships. In addition, the university does not officially recognize Fly Club.

== See also ==
- Harvard College social clubs
- Collegiate secret societies in North America
- Honor society
- Secret society
