= Harvard College social clubs =

Harvard College has several types of social clubs. These are split between coeducational clubs recognized by the college, and unrecognized single-sex clubs which were subject to College sanctions in the past. The Hasty Pudding Club holds claim as the oldest collegiate social club in America, tracing its roots back to 1770. The next oldest institutions, dating to 1791, are the traditionally all-male final clubs. Fraternities were prominent in the late 19th century as well, until their initial expulsions and then eventual resurrection off Harvard's campus in the 1990s. From 1991 onwards, all-female final clubs as well as sororities began to appear. Between 1984 and 2018, no social organizations were recognized by the school due to the clubs' refusal to become coeducational.

Beginning with the Spee Club in 2015, a number of formerly single-sex organizations began to admit new members of both sexes. In 2016, Harvard announced sanctions on members of remaining single-sex clubs, aiming to push them to become coed. On September 8, 2018, Harvard announced that it would recognize an initial list of fifteen social organizations that either already were coeducational or had committed to becoming such. On June 30, 2020, Harvard announced that it would drop its social group sanctions as a result of a Supreme Court decision on sex discrimination.

== Origins ==
The historical basis for the name "final clubs" dates to the late 19th century, a time when Harvard had a variety of clubs for students of each class year. During that period, Harvard College freshmen could join a freshman club, then a "waiting club," and eventually, as they neared completion of their studies, a "final club." Hence, students of different years joined different clubs, and the "final clubs" were so named because they were the last social club a person could join before graduation.

Harvard's final clubs for women date to 1991 with the founding of the Bee Club.

Many of the clubs were founded in the 19th century, after Harvard banned traditional fraternities in the 1850s. The Phoenix SK is the amalgam of three separate clubs: the Phoenix, the Sphinx, and the Kalumet.

== List of clubs ==
Male final clubs:

- Porcellian Club (1791)
- A.D. Club (1836)
- Delphic Club (1846)
- Fly Club (1836, 1878)
- Phoenix S.K. Club (1895)
- Owl Club (1896)
- Fox Club (1898)

Female final clubs:

- Bee Club (1991)
- The Seneca (1999)
- The IC (2000)
- The Pleiades Society (2002)
- La Vie Club (2008)
- The Exister Society (2017)
- The Ivy (2018)

Co-ed final clubs:

- Spee Club (1852)
- Sab Club (2002)

Other social clubs:

- Hasty Pudding Club (1770, 1795)
- The FDL (formerly Kappa Kappa Gamma)
- Signet Society (1871)
- The Aleph (formerly Alpha Epsilon Pi)
- Kalí Praxí (formerly Delta Gamma)
- The John Adams Society
- Themis Asteri (formerly Kappa Alpha Theta)
- Sigma Chi
- Oak Club (1999)
- Lion Club (1893, 2016)

== History ==
The Harvard men's final clubs trace their roots to the late 18th century, while the five formerly all-female social clubs were founded more recently. The Seneca is a women’s final club founded in 1999 with both a social and philanthropic mission. It carries out its philanthropic work through the Via Faciam Foundation, an affiliated 501(c)(3) nonprofit organization. The Bee Club was founded in 1991, IC in 2000, The Pleiades Society in 2002, Sab Club in 2002, and La Vie Club in 2008. The Signet Society, Crimson Key Society, The Harvard Krokodiloes, The Harvard Advocate, Hasty Pudding Theatricals, and The Harvard Lampoon also have selective membership, but their charters define them as something other than social organizations, based on their literary, artistic, or service-based characteristics.

Nine of the historically all-male clubs own real estate in Harvard Square, with the clubhouses usually including dining areas, libraries, and game rooms. Most are staffed with chefs, stewards, and other paid personnel, and serve lunch and dinner meals at regular schedules. The Delphic house boasts a regulation-size squash court.

The Fly Club owns additional property at 45 Dunster Street, in a building that is currently home to the Hasty Pudding Club. The building was originally home to the D.U. Club (the "Duck") before its merger with the Fly Club in 1996, and it hosted the Bee Club until its subsequent merging with the Delphic Club. The Delphic has since dissolved its relationship with the Bee Club.

In 1996 the D.U club merged with the Fly after an incident occurred the prior school year. In February 1995 John Burnham, a high school senior and star quarterback from the Landon School in Bethesda, MD was on a recruitment trip for football and was brought to their club house to "show him a good time". He left the house feeling "verbally abused" after he got into an argument with Harvard offensive tackle Sean Hansen and other club members regarding whether or not he had a big mouth and if his jacket was actually upstairs. He returned later to retrieve his jacket from upstairs and to have a word with Hansen. Burnham claimed that Hansen hit him right when he entered, while other witnesses say that Burnham instigated the fight and came in charging at Hansen. Burnham was beaten so severely that he required surgery to left eye that had received a blow-out fracture. Burnham later pulled his application and the club operated under heavy restrictions for the rest of the academic year.

The D.U. Club's graduate membership merged with the Fly in 1996. In a controversial move, the Fly did not allow former D.U. undergraduate members to integrate, and subsequently the undergraduate D.U. membership formed The Oak Club. La Vie Club rents a colonial style house on Garden Street.

== Sanctions ==
In the fall of 2015, Harvard President Drew Faust criticized the clubs for—as stated by C. Ramsey Fahs of The Harvard Crimson—their "gender exclusivity and the potential for alcohol abuse and sexual assault on the off-campus properties." The Spee Club began admitting women in later 2015, and the Fox Club followed suit but was then temporarily shut down as graduate board members sought to re-evaluate what it meant to be a member of the Fox.

As part of an effort to marginalize organizations that "contribute to a social life and a student culture that for many on our campus is disempowering and exclusionary", a new policy provides that students entering in the fall of 2017 or later who join unrecognized single-sex organizations (such as single-sex final clubs, fraternities, and sororities) will be barred from campus leadership positions such as team captaincies, and from receiving recommendation letters from Harvard requisite for scholarships and fellowships.

At least one club protested that the new rule infringes students' right of free association, and enforcement faced potential challenges with the difficulty of establishing who the members of each club are. In 2016, the President and Vice President of the Undergraduate Council, Shaiba Rather and Daniel Banks, spoke before the elected Faculty Council and the Faculty of Arts and Sciences of Harvard University to support the effort to curb gender-discrimination amongst student organizations. Their statement was the first official opinion of any elected members of the student body on the matter. As administrative officials endeavored to implement and rewrite the sanctions, Rather and Banks were drafted as hardliners against any gender discrimination between Final Clubs and the Harvard student body. However, in November 2016, 59% of undergraduate student voters on a referendum question were in favor of repealing the sanctions, while 30% were against repealing the sanctions and 9% abstained from voting. The vote had no immediate effect on the policy.

In December 2017, the university's highest governing body, the Harvard Corporation, voted to approve the sanctions and confirm their permanence. Currently, members of the class of 2021 and beyond who are members of unrecognized (single-gender) social organizations are barred from "holding leadership positions in recognized student organizations, becoming varsity captains, or receiving College endorsement for prestigious fellowships," according to The Harvard Crimson. The university has faced questions about how it will enforce its sanctions policy, and the enforcement mechanism remains somewhat unclear. As the class of 2021 had its first opportunity to join single-gender organizations in fall of 2018 (and as members of that class will begin to seek on-campus leadership positions as juniors in 2019), it is expected that Harvard will face its first real test in enforcing the sanctions in 2019.

In response to the policy, the all-female Sablière and Seneca societies instituted gender-neutral recruitment policies in 2016. The all-male Oak Club followed suit in January 2017 after reaching a "club-wide consensus". Former sorority Kappa Kappa Gamma announced it would form a new gender-inclusive group called the Fleur-de-Lis (FDL) beginning in February 2018.

In September 2018, Harvard released a public list of organizations it would recognize, certifying their gender-inclusive status or their commitment to achieving gender-inclusive status. In addition to the Sab, Oak, Seneca, and FDL, this initial list included the Spee Club, the Fox Club, the Delphic Club and Bee Club Merged Group (The Delphic has since dissolved its relationship with the Bee Club), the Aleph (formerly Alpha Epsilon Pi), the La Vie Club, The IC Club, the K.S. (formerly Kappa Sigma), the Ivy (formerly Alpha Phi, the Pleaides Society, the Kali Praxi (formerly Delta Gamma), and the TA (formerly Kappa Alpha Theta).

In June 2020, following the U.S. Supreme Court's ruling in Bostock v. Clayton County that Title VII of the Civil Rights Act of 1964 prohibits employment discrimination against LGBTQ workers, Harvard Corporation voted to rescind its approval of the sanctions.

== Proposed elimination from campus life ==
In July 2017, a Harvard committee pointed to Bowdoin College as a model for eradicating final clubs, sororities, and fraternities from campus social life. This preliminary recommendation would have taken effect with the incoming class of 2021, so all currently enrolled students would be exempt. The transition period would have extended into May 2022 before all such organizations and social clubs would be abolished.

After the committee released its 22-page report, The Harvard Crimson reported that the committee, co-chaired by Danoff Dean of the College Rakesh Khurana, had not been transparent in its deliberations or conclusions. Members of the committee, speaking anonymously, described "a process ... marked by confusion, disagreement, and opacity, resulting in a report that did not necessarily capture the full committee's views." Moreover, according to The Crimson, the report misrepresented the conclusions of the committee:

According to documents reviewed by The Crimson, the decision to outlaw membership in social groups at Harvard—some over two centuries old—received only seven votes from the 27-person committee.

By contrast, two other options—one suggesting a new committee to oversee the social groups, another proposing a ban of all organizations that discriminate on the basis of sex, race, or socioeconomic status—gained 12 and 11 votes, respectively. Not every member of the committee was present at the vote.

The committee never conducted another vote after May 12. At the body's last meeting 14 days later, the decision to ban membership in the groups had become a fait accompli: Committee members spent most of the meeting debating the finer points of the proposed social group prohibition, according to two members of the committee. No student members were in attendance.

== Controversies ==
Harvard severed ties with final clubs in 1984 because of their refusal to admit women.

During the 2006 Senate hearings on the nomination of Samuel Alito to the United States Supreme Court, Senator Ted Kennedy was among those highlighting Alito's membership in Concerned Alumni of Princeton, which had opposed admission of women into Princeton; when Kennedy's membership in the Owl Club was pointed out, Kennedy resigned from the club. That same year, Massachusetts gubernatorial candidate Deval Patrick's membership in the Fly Club was criticized as contradictory to his image as a champion of civil rights; Patrick responded that he had left the club in the early 1980s for that reason.

In 2016, The New York Times noted, "To many students, the clubs remain potent symbols of privilege, anachronistic and out of place on an increasingly diverse campus".

In December 2018, separate suits were filed in federal and Massachusetts courts by national fraternities and sororities which alleged that Harvard's policies against single-sex clubs were discriminatory. (Note: https://www.nbcnews.com/news/us-news/harvard-sued-fraternities-sororities-over-single-sex-rule-n942961) The lawsuits filed by the organizations were settled on undisclosed terms on August 21, 2020, in the United States District Court for the District of Massachusetts.

== In popular culture ==
- The Social Network film featured The Phoenix – S K Club and the Porcellian Club.
- The Accidental Billionaires by Ben Mezrich.

== See also ==
- Collegiate secret societies in North America
- Lincoln's Inn Society
