= Hasty Pudding Club =

Social club at Harvard University

- Founded: September 1, 1795; 231 years ago Harvard University
- Type: Social club
- Affiliation: The Hasty Pudding - Institute of 1770
- Status: Active
- Scope: Local
- Motto: Concordia Discors "Discordant Harmony"
- Symbol: Pudding Pot
- Chapters: 1
- Nickname: Pudding
- Alternative name: The Hasty Pudding Institute of 1770
- Headquarters: 45 Dunster Street; Cambridge, Massachusetts 02138; United States
- Website: www.hastypudding.org

The Hasty Pudding Club, often referred to simply as the Pudding, is a social club at Harvard University, and one of three sub-organizations that comprise the Hasty Pudding - Institute of 1770. The historic clubhouse at 12 Holyoke Street was designed by Peabody and Stearns and was placed on the National Register of Historic Places on January 9, 1978.

The year of founding for the Hasty Pudding Club is 1795. The Pudding claims to be the oldest collegiate social club in the United States. Historically, the club has been noted for its "prestigious" reputation and viewed as "the first step towards final club membership." An 1870 travel book listed the Hasty Pudding Club and the Porcellian Club as "the two lions of Harvard."

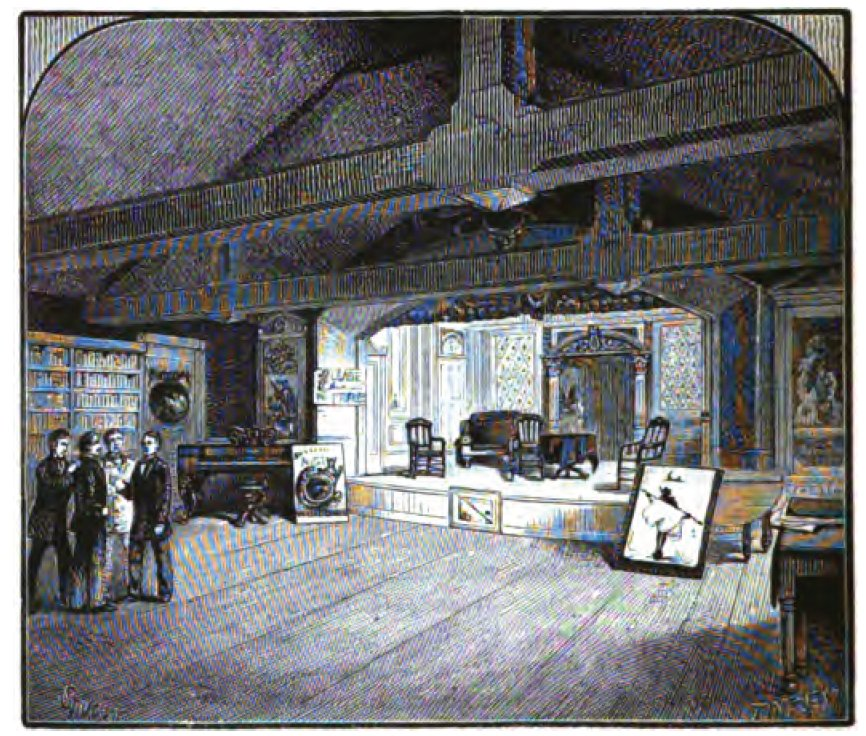
The Hasty Pudding Club stage c. 1876

== History ==
The society was founded on September 1, 1795, by 21 juniors in the room of Nymphas Hatch. The founding undergraduates came together "to cherish feelings of friendship and patriotism." Among the co-founders was John Collins Warren. The club is named for hasty pudding, a traditional English dish popular at that time in America that the founding members ate at their first meeting. Each week two members, chosen in alphabetical order, had to provide a pot of hasty pudding for the club to enjoy.

Originally, the club engaged in holding mock trials, which became more elaborate over time. This culminated in a member, Lemuel Hayward, secretly planning to stage a musical on the night he was to host the club's meeting. On December 13, 1844, Hayward and other members staged Bombastes Furioso in room 11 of Hollis Hall, which began the Hasty Pudding Theatricals.

Throughout its history, the Hasty Pudding Club has absorbed other organizations. In 1924, the Club absorbed the Institute of 1770, D.K.E, which was established in 1770. In 2012, the Hasty Pudding Club, Hasty Pudding Theatricals, and The Harvard Krokodiloes merged into a single entity: The Hasty Pudding - Institute of 1770.

The Pudding claims to be the oldest collegiate social club in the United States.

- Hasty Pudding Club
- U.S. National Register of Historic Places
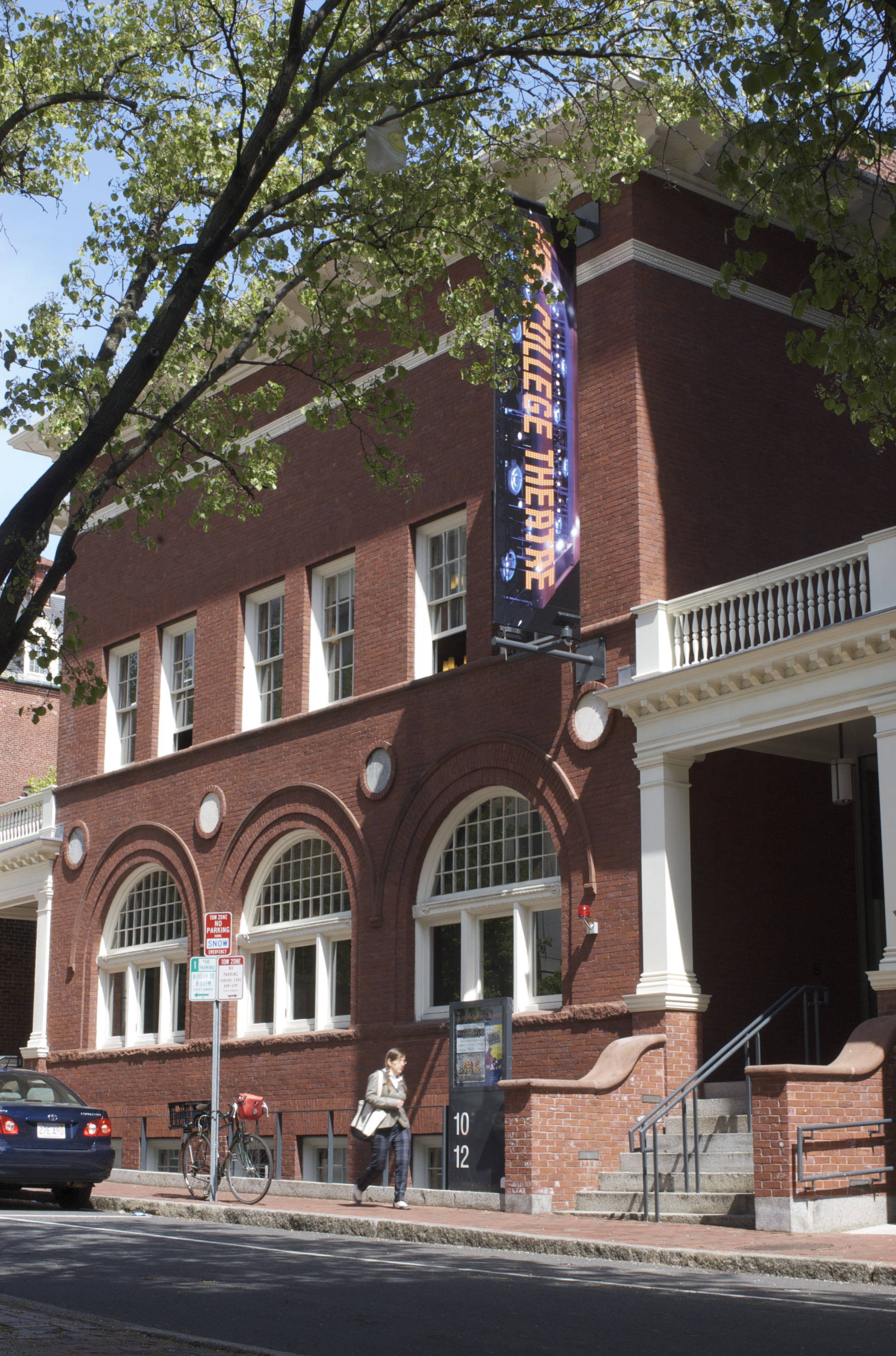
- Former location of the Hasty Pudding Club at 12 Holyoke Street
- Location: 45 Dunster Street; Cambridge, Massachusetts
- Coordinates: 42°22′19″N 71°07′10″W
- Built: 1888
- Architect: Peabody and Stearns
- NRHP reference No.: 78000442
- Added to NRHP: January 9. 1978

== Symbols ==
The club's motto, Concordia Discors (discordant harmony), derives from the epistles of the Latin poet Horace. Its symbol is the pudding pot. It was named for the hasty pudding, a porridge made from molasses and cornmeal, that its founding members ate at each meeting.

== Clubhouse ==
The current clubhouse is located at 45 Dunster Street in Cambridge. It was designed in 1888 by Peabody and Stearns. It contains rooms with specific purposes—such as The Arena, the club's game room, which has no windows or openings to the outside. It was placed on the National Register of Historic Places on January 9, 1978.

== Membership ==
The Hasty Pudding Club is co-ed and has members from all four years. Students gain membership in the club by attending a series of lunches, cocktail parties, and other gatherings—which are referred to as the punch process.

== Activities ==
The club holds its social activities in a clubhouse near Harvard Square. These include lunches, weekly Members' Nights, dinner and cocktail parties, as well as parties.

== See also ==
- National Register of Historic Places listings in Cambridge, Massachusetts
- Hasty Pudding Theatricals
- Collegiate secret societies in North America
- Harvard College social clubs
