= List of Harvard College undergraduate organizations =

== Performing arts ==
A cappella groups

- The Harvard Krokodiloes, a lower-voice a cappella group that tours four months per year, founded in 1946 from the Hasty Pudding Club.
- Radcliffe Pitches, all-female a cappella group founded in 1975.
- Harvard Opportunes, Harvard's oldest mixed vocal a cappella group, founded in 1980.
- Glee Club Lite, the a cappella subset of the Harvard Glee Club, founded in 1985.
- The Harvard-Radcliffe Veritones, a co-ed group known for a diverse contemporary repertoire, founded in 1985.
- Harvard Callbacks, contemporary mixed vocal, founded in 1986.
- Harvard Din & Tonics, a jazz a cappella group that travels every other year founded in 1979.
- Harvard LowKeys, a co-ed a cappella group founded in 1999, singing predominantly contemporary music.
- Harvard Fallen Angels, an all-female a cappella group founded in 2000.

Opera companies

- Harvard College Opera, the entirely undergraduate opera company, performs one opera each year.
- Lowell House Opera, the oldest continually performing opera company in New England.
- The Harvard-Radcliffe Gilbert and Sullivan Players, founded in 1956, performs comic opera by Gilbert and Sullivan and by others.
70th annual Lowell House Opera (LHO) Turandot opera by Puccini<ref>"Turandot (2008)". Lowell House Opera.</ref>

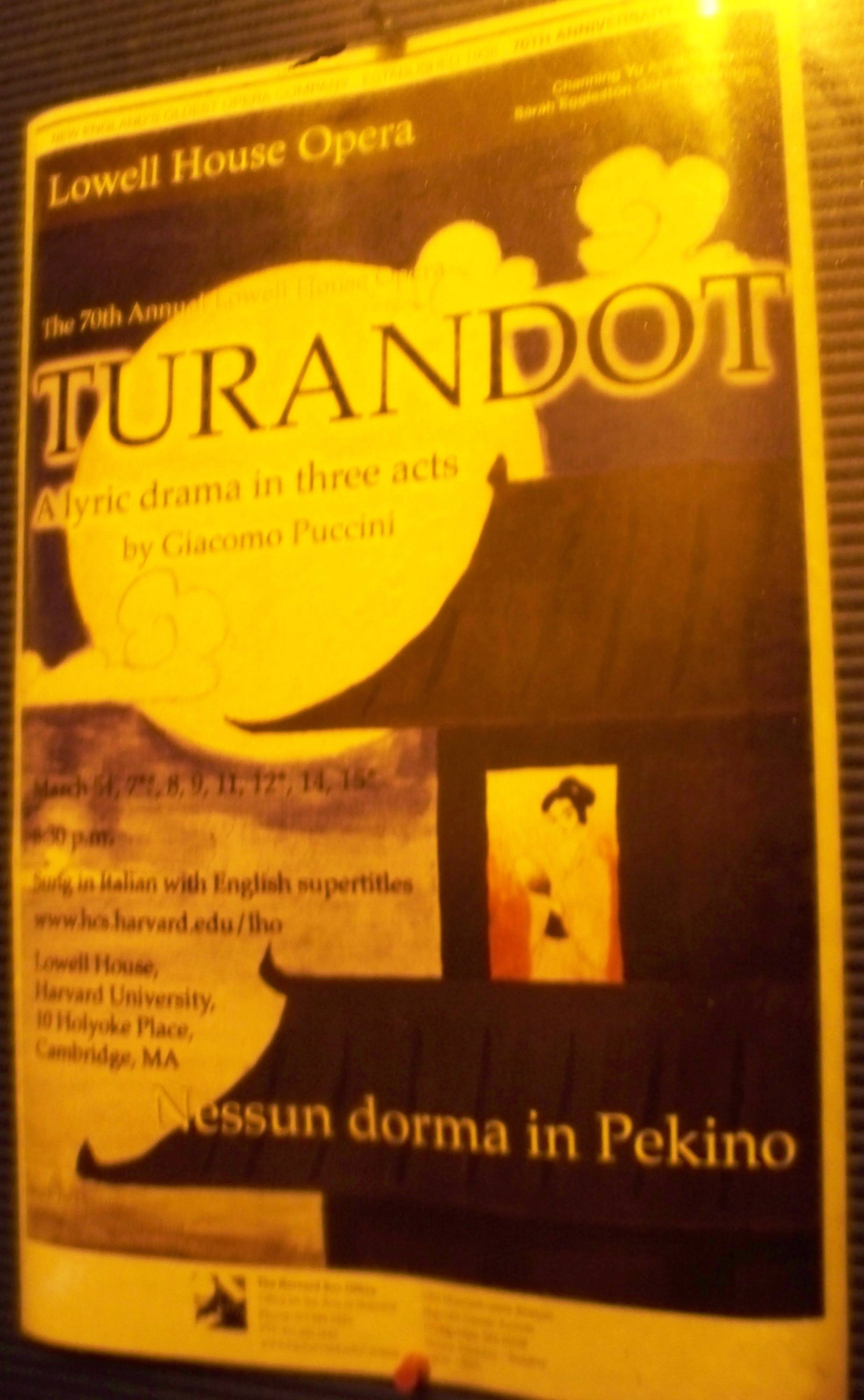

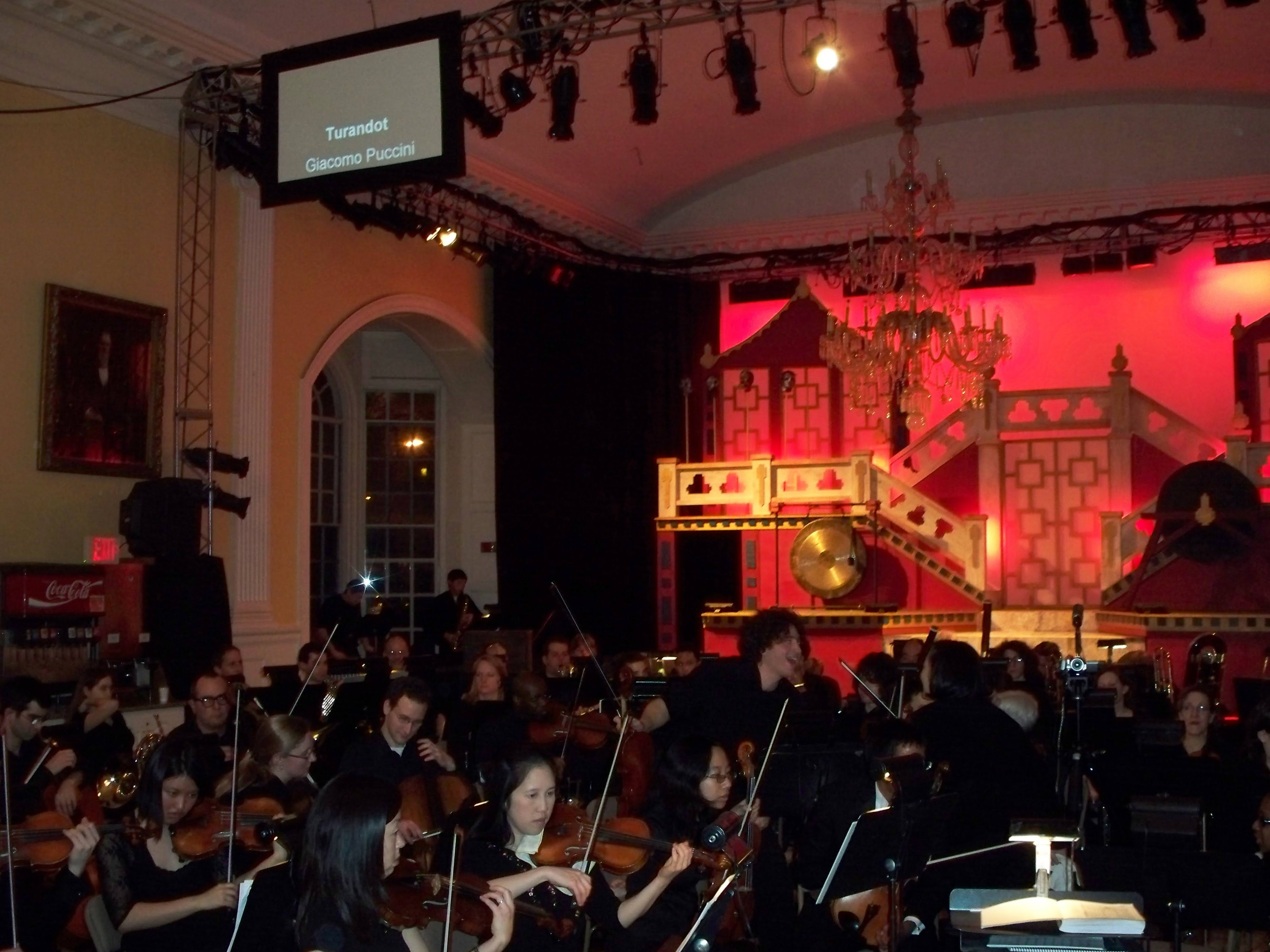

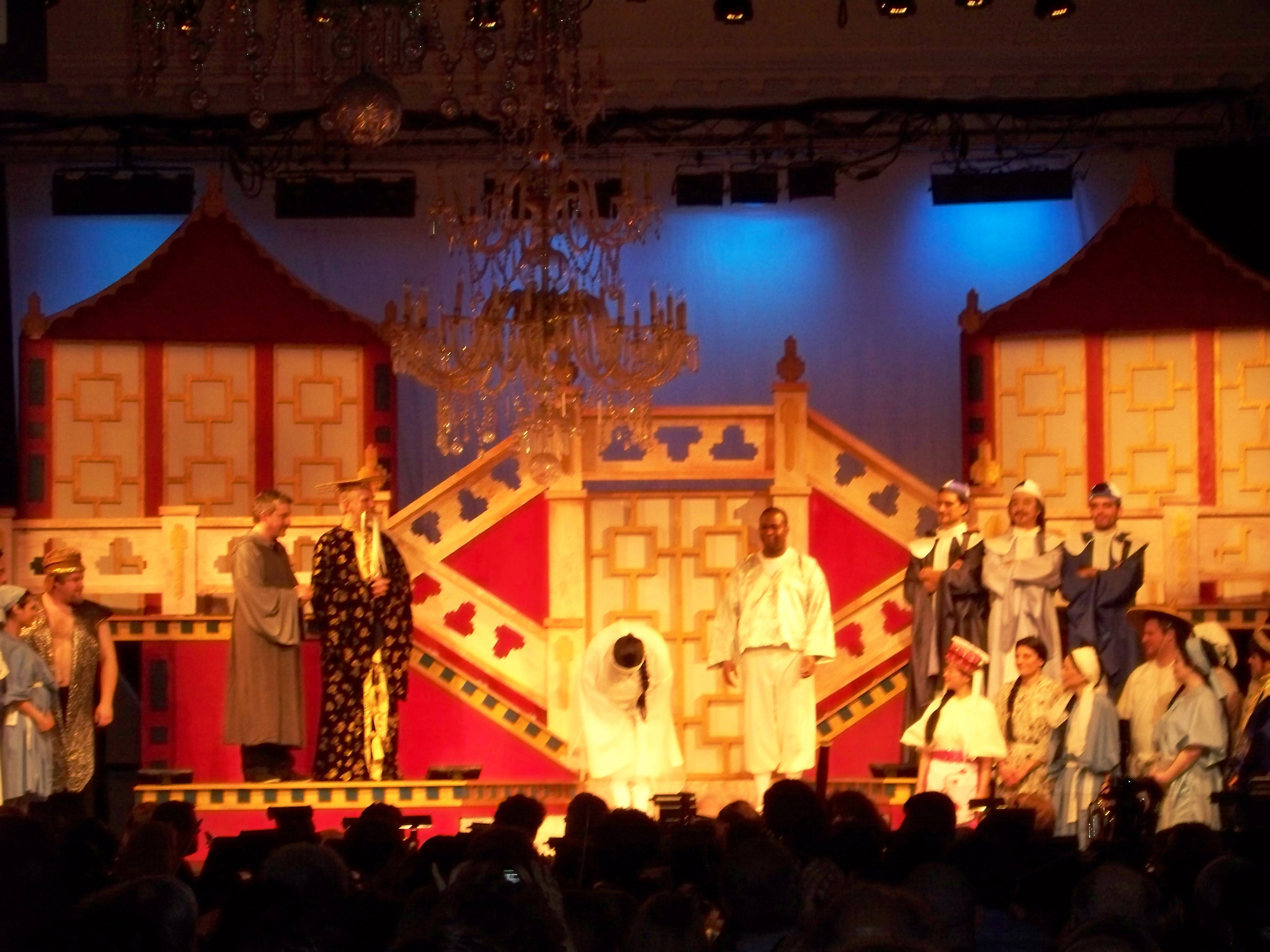

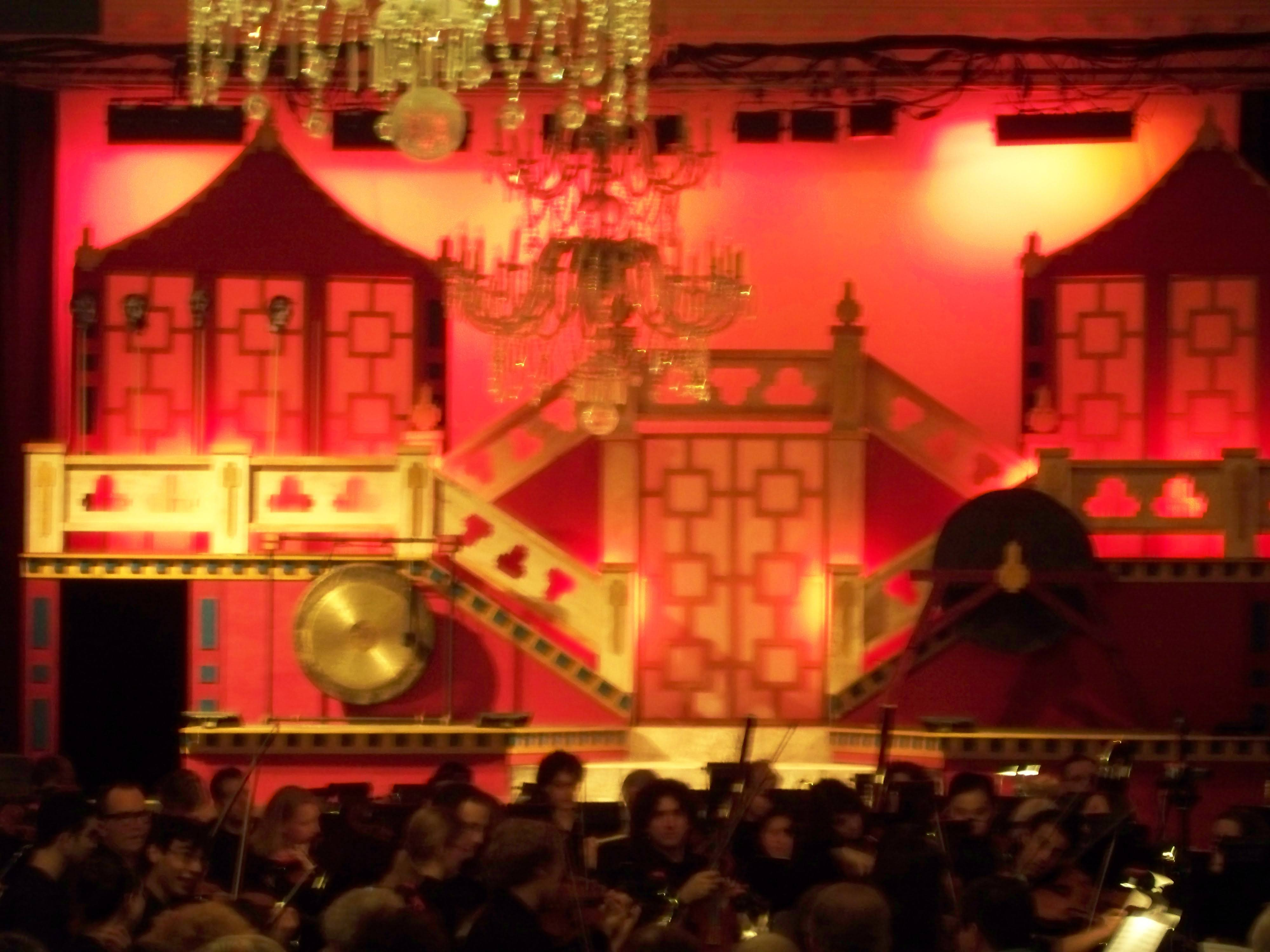

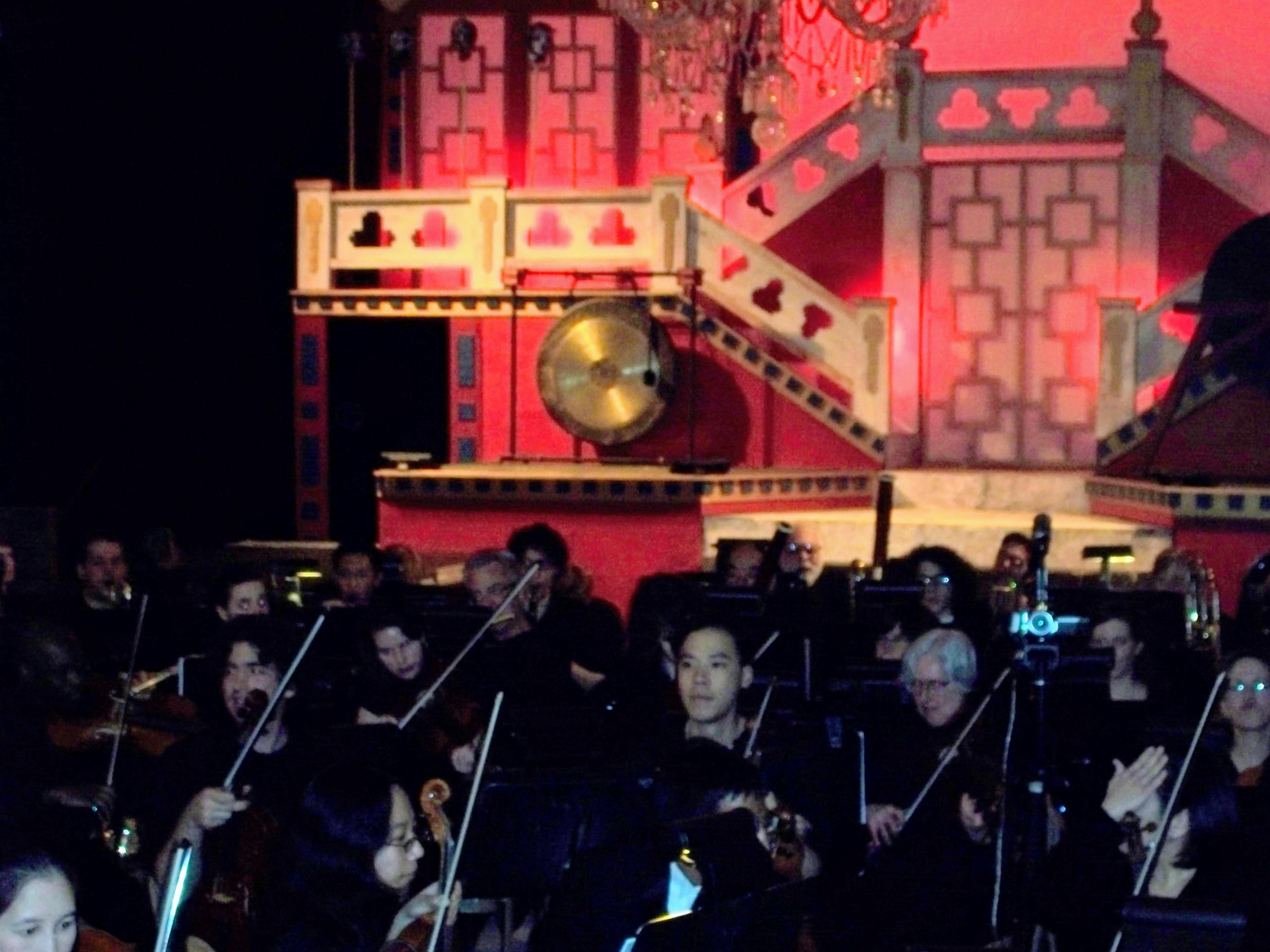

Choral groups

- Harvard-Radcliffe Collegium Musicum, a select mixed choir formed in 1971.
- Harvard Glee Club, the oldest college chorus in America, founded in 1858.
- Radcliffe Choral Society, founded in 1898, an all-women chorus.
- Harvard-Radcliffe Chorus, which consists of faculty, staff, community members, as well as graduate students and undergraduates.
- Harvard University Choir, formally established in 1834 but in existence since the eighteenth century, which sings at Sunday services in the Memorial Church.
- The Kuumba Singers of Harvard College, the oldest existing Black organization at Harvard College (founded in 1970), celebrates Black creativity and spirituality.

Orchestras and bands

- Harvard Radcliffe Orchestra, founded in 1808.
- Harvard Bach Society Orchestra, founded in 1898 as "The Musical Club of Harvard University," is Harvard's chamber orchestra.
- Harvard University Band, founded in 1919, plays university sporting events and in other community venues.
- Harvard Pops Orchestra, known for their fun performances and innovative repertoire.
- Harvard Mozart Society Orchestra, founded in 1984, performs often with Robert Levin.
- Harvard Baroque Chamber Orchestra, which performs in the Memorial Church.
- Harvard Jazz Orchestra, founded in 1971.
- Harvard Wind Ensemble, founded in the 1960s.
- River Charles Ensemble, a chamber group modeled after the Orpheus Chamber Orchestra.

Theater and dance

- The Harvard-Radcliffe Dramatic Club (HRDC) connects smaller campus theater groups and supports all campus productions.
- Hasty Pudding Theatricals, formed in 1795, is known for its student-written burlesque musicals.
- The Immediate Gratification Players (IGP), On Thin Ice (OTI), and Three Letter Acronym (TLA) are Harvard's three undergraduate improvisational comedy groups.
- Harvard BlackCAST (Community and Student Theater) is Harvard's theater group dedicated to Black theatrical production and fostering a Black theater community on campus.
- Harvard College Asian Student Arts Project (ASAP), Harvard's community and organization dedicated to the theater and arts community for Asian students on campus.
- The Harvard-Radcliffe Modern Dance Company.
- The Harvard Ballet Company, a student-run organization that performs and choreographs classical ballet, contemporary, and modern dance.
- The Harvard Ballroom Team, one of the largest national collegiate ballroom teams.
- The Harvard Ballet Folklórico de Aztlán.
- Harvard Deepam performs Bharatanatyam.
- The Harvard Intertribal Indian Dance Troupe performs Native American powwow dances.
- The Harvard Pan-African Dance and Music Ensemble is dedicated to raising awareness of the depth and diversity of African expressive culture through the performance of dance and music from all over the continent.
- The Harvard Crimson Dance Team.
- Harvard College ¡TEATRO!, a Latino theater group.

Other

- HarvardTHUD (The Harvard Undergraduate Drummers), founded in 1999, known for their creative percussion performance with plastic Solo cups, brooms, and traditional instruments.
- The Noteables, a non-audition group that performs revue-style musical theater.

== Publications and media ==
Many Harvard undergraduate publications and productions are distributed worldwide.

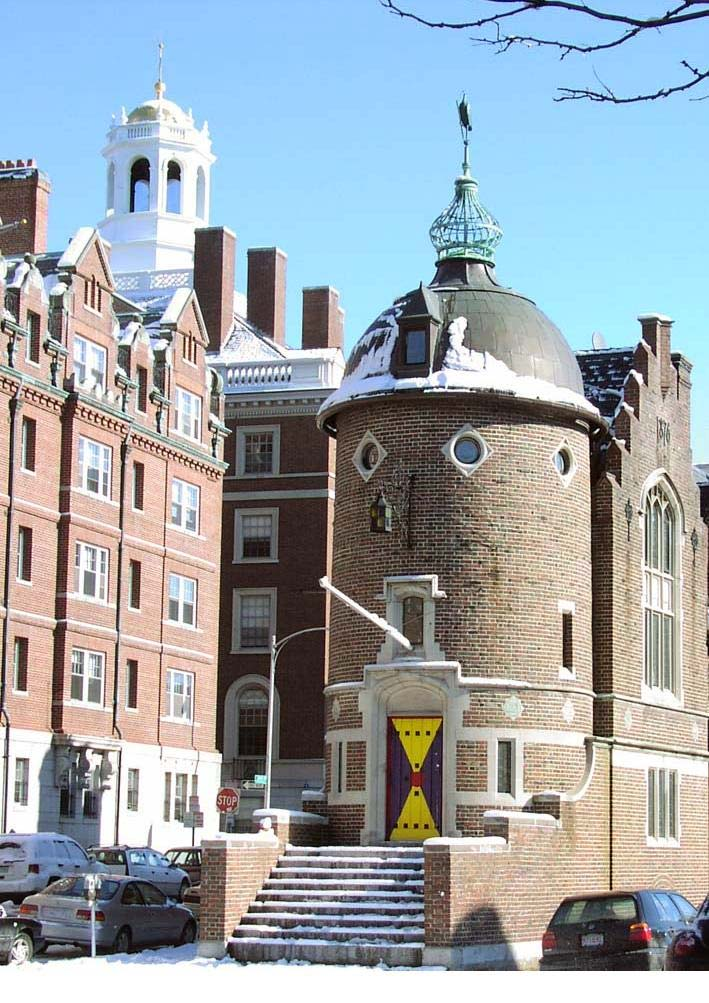
The Harvard Lampoon's "castle" features anthropomorphic eyes, nose, mouth, and bow-tie.

- The Harvard Crimson, the United States' oldest continually published daily college newspaper.
- SatireV, the college's satire publication which focuses on bringing satirical Harvard, national, and international news into the public sphere.
- Harvard Yearbook Publications, Inc., publisher of the senior yearbook since 1950.
- The Harvard Advocate, the oldest continuously published college literary magazine.
- The Harvard Lampoon, founded in 1876 on the model of Punch.
- The Harvard Political Review, founded in 1969 by former Vice President Al Gore.
- The Harvard International Review, which regularly carries articles by prominent scholars and policymakers.
- Radio station WHRB, noted for its periodic "Orgies" devoted to certain performers, composers, genres, and themes.
- The Harvard Interactive Media Group publishes a quarterly academic review devoted to media studies and video games.
- The Harvard Review of Philosophy, which publishes professional philosophy
- The Harvard Science Review, Harvard's oldest undergraduate science publication.
- The Harvard Undergraduate Research Journal, which showcases peer-reviewed undergraduate research.
- The Harvard Independent, an alternative weekly with news, opinion, sports, arts, and features.
- Harvard Undergraduate Television, producer of the comedy news program On Harvard Time and the soap opera Ivory Tower.
- The Gamut
- Her Campus Harvard, an intersectional, feminist publication, targeted at women in college.

== Service ==
- The Phillips Brooks House Association, an umbrella community service organization operating in Phillips Brooks House of Harvard Yard, consists of 78 program committees and over 1,800 student volunteers, and serves close to 10,000 clients in the Cambridge and Boston area.
- Harvard for Haiti
- Harvard for Japan
- Harvard for Pakistan
- Harvard for the Horn
- Harvard CityStep provides an arts education through dance, taught by undergraduates, to students in city schools with under-funded arts programs.

== Political ==
- The Harvard Undergraduate Council, elected by undergraduates, advocates on behalf of students, operates certain student services, and grants funds to other student organizations.
- The Harvard Institute of Politics, a non-partisan living memorial to President John F. Kennedy that promotes public service and provides political opportunities to undergraduates.
- The Harvard College Democrats, the largest partisan political group on campus.
- The Harvard Republican Club.
- Harvard Undergraduates for Bipartisan Solutions, also known as Harvard Bipartisans, is a center for bipartisan and non-partisan thought, policymaking, and discussion.
- The Harvard Speech and Parliamentary Debate Society fields one of the top intercollegiate debate teams in the world.
- The Harvard Project for Asian and International Relations organizes two annual conferences at Harvard and in Asia to facilitate discussion of the economic, political, and social issues relevant to the Asia-Pacific region.
- Harvard Model Congress, in which high school students from around the world conduct simulated sessions of the United States Congress.
- The Harvard International Relations Council promotes international awareness and sponsors a Model United Nations.
- Project IMUSE, a non-profit organization run by students at Harvard, Tsinghua, and Peking University that aims to foster mutual curiosity, respect, and understanding between people in China and North America.
- The Harvard Undergraduate Foreign Policy Initiative, an undergraduate think tank and a hub for discussing foreign policy and national security.
- The Harvard College China Forum

== Academic ==
- Dynamo.
- Harvard College Engineering Society.
- Harvard College Stem Cell Society, a student group dedicated to raising awareness about the ethics, politics, and science of stem cell research.
- Harvard Ethnic Studies Coalition advocates for a robust and interdisciplinary Ethnic Studies program at Harvard.
- Task Force on Asian and Pacific American Studies at Harvard College promotes Asian and Pacific American Studies by bringing together students, faculty, staff, and alumni and facilitating multidisciplinary academic discussion and social connection.
- Women in Science at Harvard–Radcliffe.
- Group for Undergraduate Students in Statistics at Harvard College, a student group dedicated to cultivating passion for statistics, creating a supportive community for undergraduates studying statistics, and providing educational opportunities for students at the College.
- Harvard-Radcliffe Society of Physics Students, a collection of dedicated students drawing from backgrounds in physics and closely related fields towards the celebration and discussion of physical topics.
- Harvard Applied Math Society, a student group dedicated to promotion of applied mathematics within the undergraduate body, cultivating a supportive community of students interested in the field and exploration of topics within, from academic to professional.
- Harvard Undergraduate Linguistics Society (HULS), a student group dedicated to the study of linguistics, which has/is continuously in the process of creating a conlang known as HULSese.

== Pre-professional ==
- Harvard Student Agencies.
- Harvard Undergraduate Consulting on Business and the Environment is a strategy consulting group specializing in technology, sustainability, and life sciences.
- Harvard College Consulting Group provides businesses with trained student analysts with term-time consulting projects.
- Harvard Undergraduate Data Analytics Group delivers term-time data consulting through skilled student analysts.
- Veritas Financial Group helps prepare students for careers in finance.
- Harvard Smart Woman Securities.
- Harvard Undergraduate Women in Business.
- Video Game Development Club.
- Harvard AI Safety Team Student Group supports students doing research to mitigate risks from advanced AI.
- Harvard Financial Analysts Club uses management of its own investment funds as a teaching vehicle.
- Harvard Investment Association educates on investing and financial markets and provides opportunities for investing experience.
- The Leadership Institute at Harvard College provides leadership training.
- Harvard College Engineering Society participates in competitions and promotes cross-disciplinary collaboration.
- Harvard Undergraduate Robotics Club is a body formed of passionate students dedicated to the promotion and celebration of robotics, regularly participating in a range of annual competitions.

== Unrecognized student groups ==
- Final Clubs: A.D., Fly, Fox, Owl, Phoenix-SK, Porcellian, Delphic, and Spee.
- Fraternities: Alpha Epsilon Pi, Delta Kappa Epsilon, Kappa Sigma, Lambda Upsilon Lambda, Sigma Alpha Epsilon, Sigma Chi.
- Female social clubs: Bee, Isis, The Seneca, La Vie, Pleiades, Sabliere Society, and Exister Society.
- Sororities: Delta Gamma, Kappa Alpha Theta, Kappa Kappa Gamma, Alpha Phi, and Alpha Pi Omega.
- Social clubs: Hasty Pudding, Signet, and Oak.

== Recognized student groups ==
- Harvard Boxing Club.
- Harvard Organization for Latin America

== Religious life ==
Chabad House

The Chabad House at Harvard is a community center for Jewish students operated by the Orthodox Jewish Chabad movement. It was founded by Rabbi Hirschy and Mrs. Elkie Zarchi in 1997. According to Professor Ruth Wisse, its success is due to the personality and energy of Rabbi Zarchi. The rabbi and his wife live at the Chabad House with their young children, which contributes to a warm family atmosphere at their Friday evening Shabbat dinners for students. In April 2010 it placed a bid of $6 million to purchase the building of the former DU Club located at 45 Dunster Street from the Fly Club. The bid was reportedly more than twice the tax-assessed value of the building and land.
