= Gamut (disambiguation) =

Gamut is the range of colors that can be reproduced by a particular printing process, display device, or set of paints.

In figurative speech it means range or scale.

Gamut may also refer to:

== Arts and design ==
- Gamut (music), a complete scale in medieval music
- Gamut mapping, a computer graphics technique
- The Gamut (album)

== People ==
- L. T. F. Gamut, a collective pseudonym for five Dutch logicians
- David Gamut, character in James Fenimore Cooper's novel The Last of the Mohicans

== Journals ==
- The Gamut, a poetry magazine at Harvard University
- Gamut: Journal of the Georgia Association of Music Theorists, a now defunct academic journal
- Gamut: The Journal of the Music Theory Society of the Mid-Atlantic, the successor of Gamut: Journal of the Georgia Association of Music Theorists

== Places ==
- Gamut, Tago, Surigao del Sur, a barangay in the Philippines
