= John Tobin =

John Tobin may refer to:

== People ==
- Sir John Tobin (1763–1851), Liverpool merchant
- John Tobin (dramatist) (1770–1804), author of The Honey Moon
- John F. Tobin (1880–1954), American football player and coach
- Jack Tobin (1892–1969), right fielder in Major League Baseball
- Jackie Tobin (1921–1982), third baseman and second baseman in Major League Baseball
- John M. Tobin, Wall Street broker in part representing Cornelius Vanderbilt (see Hiram Bond)
- John Tobin (Nova Scotia politician) (1810–1869), politician in Nova Scotia
- John M. Tobin (politician) (1885–1956), politician in Newfoundland
- John Michael Tobin (1841–1898), American Civil War officer and Medal of Honor recipient
- John Tobin (rugby league) (born 1959), rugby league footballer
- John Tobin (boxer) (born 1963), Grenadian Olympic boxer
- John Tobin (Gaelic footballer) (born 1952), Irish Gaelic football manager and former player
- John M. Tobin Jr. (born 1969), former Boston city councilor
- Jackie Tobin (John Patrick Tobin, 1921–1982), American baseball player
- Tip Tobin (John Martin Tobin, 1906–1983), American baseball player

== Ship ==
- John Tobin (1809 ship)

== See also ==
- The John M. Tobin Montessori School in Cambridge, Mass.
