= Thud =

Thud or THUD may refer to:

== Arts and entertainment ==
- Thud, a fictional character in the animated film A Bug's Life (1998)
- Thud, a fictional character in the animated film series The Land Before Time (1988–2016)
- Thud (album), a 1995 rock album by Kevin Gilbert
- Thud (game), a 2002 board game inspired by Terry Pratchett's Discworld series
- Thud!, a 2005 Discworld novel by Terry Pratchett
- Thud!, a 1997 children's book by Nick Butterworth

== Other ==
- F-105 Thunderchief, a U.S. fighter-bomber, nicknamed Thud
- The Harvard Undergraduate Drummers, a student percussion group at Harvard University
- Thud (media company), a satirical media company founded by Elon Musk
- THUD (US House subcommittee), informal name of a U.S. House subcommittee
- THUD (US Senate subcommittee), informal name of a U.S. Senate subcommittee
- Thud experiment, a 1973 study into the validity of psychiatric diagnosis
