= University of Georgia Press =

American publisher

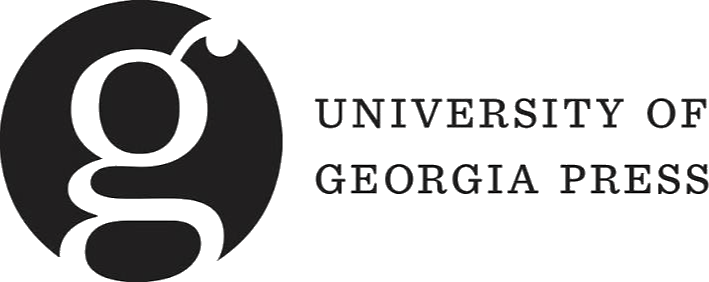
- Parent company: University of Georgia
- Founded: 1938
- Country of origin: United States
- Headquarters location: Athens, Georgia
- Distribution: Longleaf Services (US); Codasat Canada (Canada); Eurospan Group (Europe)
- Publication types: Books
- Imprints: Brown Thrasher Books
- Official website: ugapress.org

The University of Georgia Press or UGA Press is the university press of the University of Georgia, a public land-grant research university with its main campus in Athens, Georgia. It is the oldest and largest publishing house in Georgia and a member of the Association of University Presses.

Domestic distribution for the press is currently provided by the University of North Carolina Press's Longleaf Services.

== History ==
Founded in 1938, the UGA Press is a publishing division of the University of Georgia and is located on the North Campus in Athens, Georgia, United States. It is the oldest and largest publishing house in the state of Georgia and one of the largest in the South. UGA Press has been a member of the Association of University Presses since 1940. The University of Georgia and Mercer University are the only member presses in the state of Georgia.

The press employs 24 full-time publishing professionals, publishes 80–85 new books a year, and has more than 1500 titles in print. The press is the only scholarly publisher within the University System of Georgia serving all 31 institutions of higher education in the state.

In 2008 the press received the Governor's Award in the Humanities.

== Publications ==
The UGA Press publishes 70–80 titles each year of scholarly and academic, regional, and literary works with a focus on American and Southern studies. It is also a leading publisher of African-American studies, civil rights history and environmental studies. The imprint Brown Thrasher Books issues reprints of Georgia classics.

The Flannery O'Connor Award for Short Fiction was established by Charles East, then the editor-in-chief of the UGA Press, in 1983 to recognize gifted young writers. The press is also a long-time publisher of creative writing through books published in conjunction with the Flannery O’Connor Award for Short Fiction, the Association of Writers & Writing Programs - Associated Writers and Writing Programs Award for Creative Nonfiction, the Cave Canem Poetry Prize, Crux: The Georgia Series in Literary Nonfiction, the National Poetry Series, and other literary competitions and series. The publishing program has been nationally recognized, and in recent years a number of books published by the press have won major awards.

In conjunction with the Georgia Humanities Council and GALILEO, the UGA Press created the New Georgia Encyclopedia, an online resource of Georgia history.

The UGA Press has successfully published original novels and works by writers such as Rick Bass, Erskine Caldwell, Terry Kay, Barry Lopez, Judith Ortiz Cofer, Mary Hood, Harry Crews, Tom Wicker, Calvin Trillin, Roy Blount, Jr., Eugene Genovese, Rebecca Solnit, David Carkeet (of Campus Sexpot fame), and Catherine Clinton.

== Controversies ==
The press has been the subject of several scandals. Documents uncovered by the website Foetry.com revealed that the 1999 University of Georgia Contemporary Poetry series prize to Peter M. Sacks had been judged by Jorie Graham, a colleague of Sacks at Harvard University who subsequently married him. Throughout the course of the controversy, series editor Bin Ramke had insisted that judges of the contest be kept secret, and until Foetry.com obtained the names of judges via The Open Records Act, the conflict of interest had been undisclosed. As a result of the critical coverage, Ramke resigned from the editorship of the series. The University of Georgia Press now discloses the names of its poetry judges, who "are instructed to avoid conflicts of interest of all kinds".

On October 27, 2005, the University of Georgia Press rescinded author Brad Vice's Flannery O'Connor Award for Short Fiction and recalled copies of his collection The Bear Bryant Funeral Train. Vice was alleged to have plagiarized sections of one story from Carl Carmer's book Stars Fell on Alabama (1934), a charge that Vice and others dispute.

== See also ==
- List of English-language book publishing companies
- List of university presses
