= Foetry.com =

Website to identify fraudulent practices in poetry

Foetry.com, sometimes referred to as just Foetry, was a website that attempted to identify fraudulent and unethical practices in poetry contests. It was active from April 1, 2004 until May 18, 2007.

== Organization ==
Members and visitors contributed information which ostensibly linked judges and prize winners in various poetry contests. The site was divided into two main areas: lists of specific contests and relationships between judges and winners which suggested evidence of impropriety, and a forum for the discussion of ethical behavior in the poetry world.

== Origins and evolution ==
Foetry.com was launched on April 1, 2004, by an anonymous editor, with the motto "Exposing fraudulent contests. Tracking the sycophants. Naming names." After about twelve months, the founder of the site, Alan Cordle, was outed. No longer anonymous, he continued to operate the site until May 18, 2007. Various members, including Cordle, continue to post blogs with foetry-related material.

Foetry.com received press coverage both positive and negative in such outlets as the Boston Globe, The New York Times, Poets & Writers Magazine, and innumerable blogs, including that of Ron Silliman. Coverage came to a head around the time of Cordle's outing, amidst rumors that the site would shut down due to the loss of anonymity. The ambiguous yet perceptible impact of the website on the poetry world was summed up in a blog entry at the Kenyon Review about a month after Foetry's closure:

"If its death (if we dare call it that–might it, like King Arthur, lie in wait to rise again at a time of future need?) made almost no noise, its birth and early years sounded a great barbaric yawp. Are contests more fair? Perhaps, perhaps not. It may in fact be the case that poetry contests are more careful about egregious conflicts of interest. They may indeed be more transparent now, as well. But it was never clear if justice or revenge was in the forefront of everyone’s mind in the heyday of Foetry.com (this applies to me and the other voyeurs of foetry.com as well as those who posted for or against the site). As people used to say in the Renaissance and earlier, Astraea (goddess of justice) has left the earth. History may record whether Foetry.com brought her back. Or, it may not."

== Successful campaigns ==
Foetry.com's most successful campaign, both in terms of news coverage and action taken because of it, was against the Contemporary Poetry Series run by the University of Georgia Press, and against Jorie Graham in particular. Acquiring documents through the Freedom of Information Act, Cordle and others discovered that Graham, as judge for the 1999 contest, had chosen Peter Sacks. She would marry Sacks in 2000. Graham would also join Sacks in a teaching position at Harvard in 2000.

Among documents obtained under the Freedom of Information Act were two letters:

- the Bin Ramke (editor of the series) letter to the editor of the University of Georgia Press explaining that he was selecting Peter Sacks as the winner for that year (although Sacks had never actually entered the contest and was in fact solicited outside the contest) and Ramke's admission that he had read only half the paid manuscript submissions -the rest were discarded
- Jorie Graham's letter to Ramke advocating for the literary value of Sack's manuscript and its publication in the series. As editor, Ramke chose Sacks as the winner for that year. As a judge advocating for Sacks as winner, someone with whom she had a personal relationship, Graham opened herself to attack on ethical grounds. Graham had previously come under fire at other poetry contests (AWP, The Barnard Poetry Prize, The Colorado Poetry Prize, The National Poetry Series, The Walt Whitman Prize) for selecting former students and individuals she had relationships with.

After Graham judged contests and selected former students several contests immediately changed their contest rules to prohibit judges from selecting former students and other entrants they had relationships with. The rule against playing favorites in literary contests in which entry fees were paid became known loosely among those in the contest industry as "The Jorie Graham Rule." Some members of Foetry.com suggested that she could be charged with mail fraud, as contest fees were collected through the US mail, but no charges were ever filed. It is estimated that the University of Georgia Press took in as much as $250,000 from contest fees over the life of the contest series, which Ramke edited for twenty years.

Graham no longer judges literary contests. Bin Ramke, editor at the time of the Contemporary Poetry Series, resigned from his position as more and more national publicity turned the spotlight on the insider dealings at the University of Georgia Press and criticism mounted over his role in the controversy. Despite the failure of both the editor of the University of Georgia Press and Bin Ramke to release a full and complete list of judges and other information (correspondence) related to the activities of the contest series, Foetry.com has carefully compiled documentation of winners and judges in the series, including notations of conflicts of interest.

Throughout the course of the contest Ramke insisted that judges of the contest be kept secret. The Open Records Act was used to obtain records that both the University of Georgia Press and Ramke refused to provide upon request. Graham had previously published several books of Ramke's through a press, Kuhl House Press, she operated at the University of Iowa with Mark Levine, a former student of Graham who was selected by Graham as winner in the National Poetry series in 1992.

Another campaign, against the University of North Texas Press, resulted in the exasperation and subsequent resignation of Vassar Miller Prize founder and series editor, Scott Cairns. While both initial screening and final judging was done "blind"—with all identifying marks having been removed from all manuscripts—some judges of the contest had apparent connections to Cairns or to the University of Utah where Cairns and a number of judges and winners had studied, not necessarily at the same time. Other Cairns connections to judges and one winner were through the University of Missouri. Cairns clarified that, given the merely token payment that was made to the judges for their service (asking them to read and judge 10-15 manuscripts for about 1/10 of what they would normally receive for giving a one-hour reading of their own works), he had depended upon the generosity of friends to serve each year. At least one judge, Eleanor Wilner, was friends with a contest winner, Constance Merritt, and had co-authored a literary work with Merritt that won the Edward Stanley Award from Prairie Schooner in the same year Wilner selected Merritt as winner of the Vassar Miller Poetry Prize. After Foetry.com alleged the relationships between Cairns, judges and winners, Cairns agreed to resign in e-mails to Alan Cordle, Steven Ford Brown (Brown edited a book of criticism on the poetry of Vassar Miller and was critical of Cairns's management of the Vassar Miller contest series) and the editor of the University of North Texas Press.

== Criticisms ==
Criticis of Foetry.com contend that it is impossible to separate personal relationships amongst writers in an aesthetic community from judgments of literary merit that these writers inevitably make in publishing and promoting other writers' work.

Foetry sparked an enthusiastic and well-coordinated campaign to dox its administrators. Efforts in this regard were coordinated in large part by contemporary poets, and Whoisfoetry?, an anonymous blog. Those seeking to dox the administrators of Foetry.com sometimes engaged in behaviors they criticized it for, e.g. "lies and innuendoes", against those suspected to be behind Foetry.com.
