= Harvard College China Forum =

Harvard Forum on US-China Relations

Harvard College China Forum 哈佛中国论坛
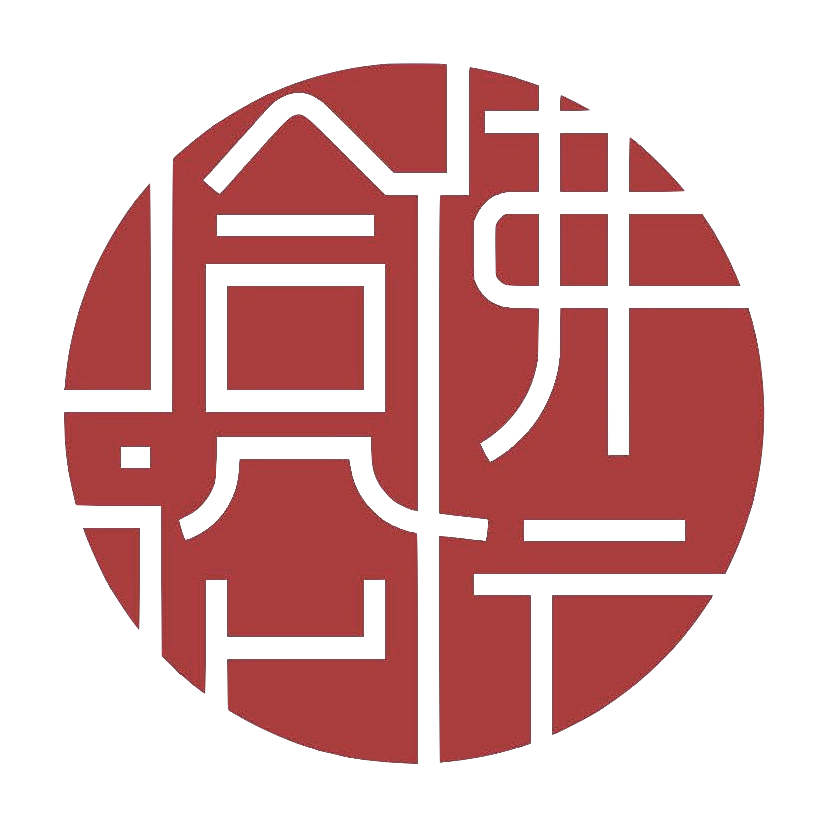
- Formation: 1997
- Legal status: Student Organization
- Headquarters: Cambridge, Massachusetts, US
- Region served: United States
- Co-Founder: Li Bo
- Co-Founder: Lee Ligang Zhang
- Website: harvardcollegechinaforum.org

The Harvard College China Forum (HCCF, Chinese: 哈佛中国论坛) is an annual conference on US-China relations organized by students of Harvard University. It originated from the academic journal Harvard China Review in 1997.

== History ==
The Harvard College China Forum was founded in 1997 by Harvard graduate students initially under the academic journal Harvard China Review. The leadership of the journal intended to use the forum to gain publicity and revenue for the journal, but shifted their emphasis onto the forum after it became better known. The journal is published quarterly since 1998.

Past speakers at the forum include Jack Ma, Lei Jun, Stephen Schwarzman, and Ray Dalio. In 2019, Kevin Rudd, Jin Liqun, Lawrence Culp, and Graham Allison spoke at the forum. In 2022, the speakers included Larry Summers, Qin Gang (then the Chinese Ambassador to the United States), and Huang Ping (consul general of China’s New York Consulate), and the attendees included Chas Freeman and Stephen Orlins. The two Chinese diplomats spoke at the forum and called for cooperation between US and China. During his speech, Huang Ping called the Chinese Communist Party a "great party".

According to the South China Morning Post, amid worsening US-China relations, the conference saw an absence of "average Americans and lawmakers" at Harvard in 2022. According to a 2023 report by Bloomberg News, fewer mainland China executives attended the forum in-person, and many previous student organizers repatriated. In particular, the forum underwent "a decoupling of sorts", as it hosted its 2021 main conference in Beijing and a secondary 2022 conference in Hangzhou. Despite the challenges, the forum continues to court a range of perspectives and endorses a generally optimistic outlook.

== The 2024 Forum ==
On April 12, 2024, the 27th Forum took place on Harvard's campus and included "a total of 130 panelists." Notable figures include Larry Summers, Graham Allison, Jason Furman, Dennis Wilder, Dongsheng Chen, chairman and CEO at Taikang Insurance Group, William Li, chief executive officer of Nio, and James Ding, managing director of GSR Ventures.

== Notable people ==
- Vincent Fang, Taiwanese lyricist, author
- Michael Szonyi, Canadian sinologist
- Stephen Orlins, American lawyer
- William C. Kirby, Chinese author
- FanFan, Taiwanese singer

== See also ==
- List of Harvard College undergraduate organizations
- Fairbank Center for Chinese Studies, a post-graduate research center at Harvard
- Harvard–Yenching Institute, an independent foundation for research on Asia
