= John M. Tobin Montessori School =

School in Cambridge, Massachusetts, United States

Graham and Parks School
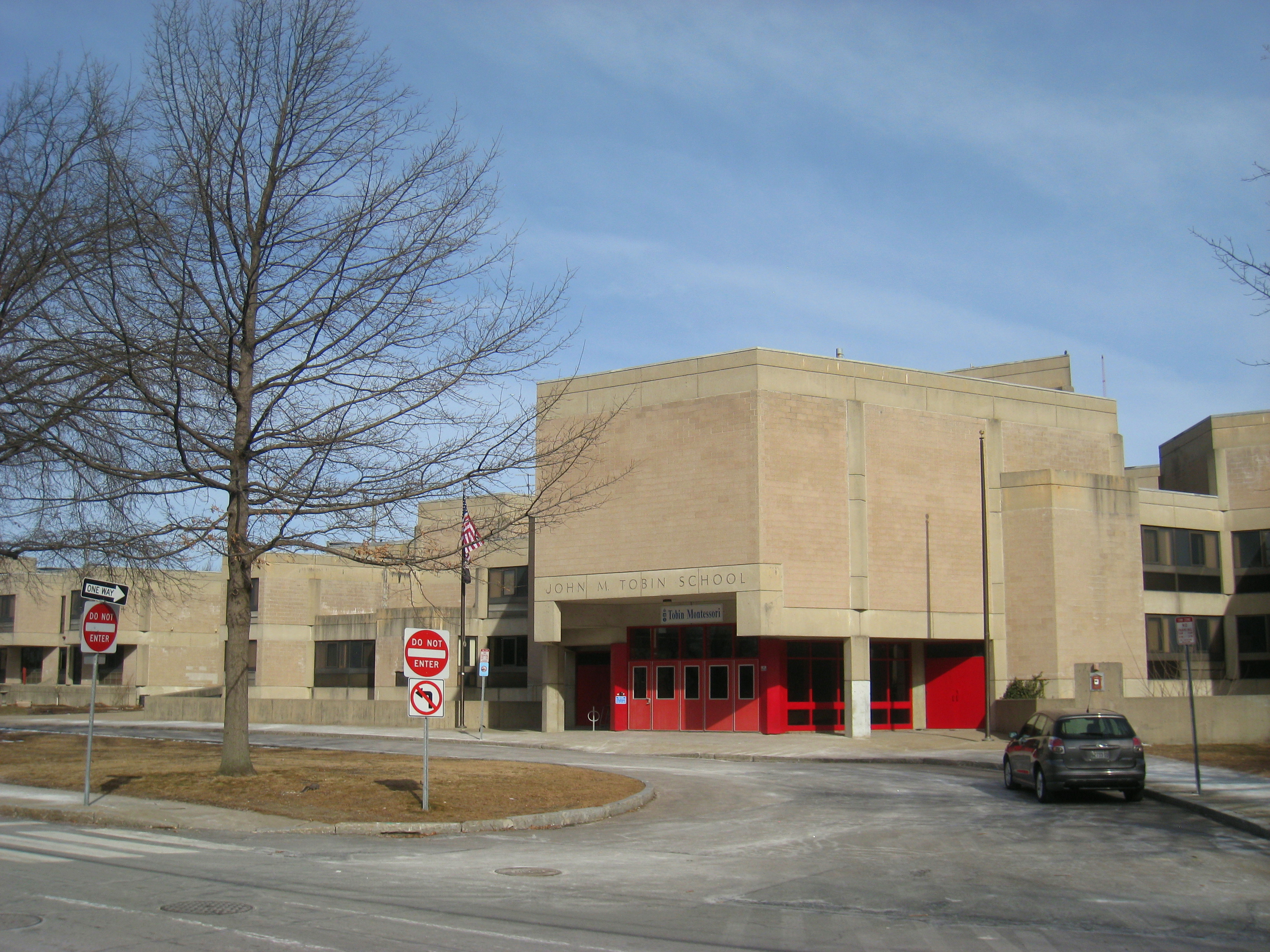

Location
- 181 Vassal Lane; Cambridge, Massachusetts 02138; 42.3844°N 71.1398°W

Information
- School type: Public
- Established: 2015
- School district: Cambridge Public School District
- Principal: Kathleen M. Smith
- Grades: Pre-K–5

The John M. Tobin Montessori School is a public Montessori school in Cambridge, Massachusetts. An elementary school, it is a part of the Cambridge Public School District. In February 2015 it was named by the American Montessori Society as the first district-level (non charter school), fully accredited, public Montessori school in the United States. The administration, faculty and staff had to spend years rewriting much of the curriculum to comply with the Massachusetts state requirements while creating the distinct, hands-on, multi-sensorial learning environment required by the American Montessori Society.

== History ==
The Tobin School opened in the fall of 1971, named after John M. Tobin who was a school superintendent in Cambridge. The Tobin School replaced the Russell School which was located on Grozier Road. The Tobin's playground is called Father Callahan park which predates the school. The building was designed by the Italian modernist architect Pietro Belluschi, Dean of the MIT School of Architecture from 1951 to 1965. Quite a bit of development was happening in West Cambridge at the time of its opening including the high rise apartments, Rindge Towers and the Walden Square apartments. The school was quickly filled to capacity. At one time it held 700 students.

In the early years, the Tobin School established the Project Follow Through program which attracted students from the successful Head Start Program. The Head Start Program gives lower income pre-school and kindergarten students some enhanced early instruction and intervention. Project Follow Through built upon that instruction while mixing the students with middle and upper income students. Later the Tobin School instituted another magnet program called, "The School of the Future." This program was an early experiment in integrating computer technology in the classroom environment. These two magnet schools worked parallel to the traditional classrooms until it became clear that computer integration was happening in all classrooms.

The Tobin School for a time became one of the least chosen schools in the "Controlled Choice" Cambridge lottery system and was under performing in the math and language testing. Although the lower grades were doing well, the upper grades had as few as 11 students in each grade. Up until this time the school taught grades Kindergarten through eighth grade. In 2005, Dr. Thomas D. Fowler-Finn, Superintendent of the Cambridge Public Schools, set in motion the transition of the Tobin into a Montessori School. The first Tobin Montessori Children's House School started in 2008. At this time the school began to accept three, four and five-year-old students into the new Children's House classrooms. Each year as these first students progressed, the Montessori School grew. In the 2012–2013 school year the first Tobin Montessori School finished the 5th grade. By this time the school became one of the top choices in the Controlled Choice lottery system. The School Committee voted to change the Controlled Choice lottery system so that the Tobin School and the Spanish language immersion Amigos School, another popular school, did not give priority to families that live in the neighbourhoods closest to the school. That same year, the Innovation Agenda created the Darby Vassall Upper School (DVUS), which had people from sixth through eighth from Tobin, Graham and Parks and Haggerty. DVUS is now a separate entity sharing the building with the Tobin Montessori school, principally on the second floor of the building.

The American Montessori Society granted full accreditation to the Tobin Montessori School in February 2015. In that year, Ms. Martha Kelly Mossman retired and literacy coach, Jaime Frost was hired as principal beginning the 2015–2016 school year.

== Timeline of the John M. Tobin Montessori School ==
- 1907 - Maria Montessori opens the first Montessori school in the San Lorenzo district of Rome, Italy.
- 1911 - Montessori's work published in McClure's Magazine and becomes popular in the United States.
- 1971 - The John M. Tobin Elementary School opens on Vassal Lane in Cambridge, Massachusetts.
- 2005 - Principal Paulette Jones commences the journey to turn the Tobin into a Montessori School.
- 2007 - The Tobin School opens four "Children's House" Montessori classrooms.
- 2008 - Principal Seth Lewis-Levin opens three "Lower Elementary" classrooms.
- 2009 - A fourth "Lower Elementary" classroom opens.
- 2010 - Due to the growing popularity of the Montessori program in the Cambridge Public Schools a fifth "Children's House" classroom.
- 2011 - New Principal Martha Mosman opens two "Upper Elementary" classrooms and commences the process of accreditation with the American Montessori Society (AMS).
- 2012 - Third "Upper Elementary" classroom opens.
- 2015 - In February, the AMS grants full accreditation to the Tobin Montessori school becoming the first district level public school in the United States to achieve full accreditation. Jaime Frost is hired as incoming principal for September 2015.
- 2025 - New building opened as two entities (Tobin Montessori and Darby Vassall Upper Schools and Community Complex). At the time of opening it was touted as the second most expensive public school in Massachusetts to build behind the city of Waltham's High School.
