= The Gamut =

The Gamut was a student publication at Harvard University between 1998 and 2017. The magazine was devoted exclusively to poetry. Weekly meetings started with the reading aloud of published poems and continued on to the reading and discussion of student submissions. All poems were considered anonymously, and each had to pass two rounds of voting in order to be published. Although the board of the magazine comprised only a few students, all Harvard undergraduates were welcome to participate in the editorial meetings.

To mark the publication of each new issue, The Gamut held a public reading in which the poets, who published in that issue, read their work. Beginning in the spring of 2006, the editors decided to reserve one half of each issue's content for the winning submission of an annual chapbook contest.

Traditionally, Harvard has been home to many of the most important American poets, including T. S. Eliot, Robert Lowell, John Brooks Wheelwright, Wallace Stevens, E. E. Cummings and John Ashbery. Later poets associated with Harvard include Seamus Heaney, Jorie Graham and Peter Sacks. Poetry is also flourishing in the undergraduate community through the work of publications such as The Gamut and The Harvard Advocate and popular bookshops like the Woodberry Poetry Room and the Grolier Poetry Book Shop at Harvard.
