= Bin Ramke =

American poet and editor (born 1947)

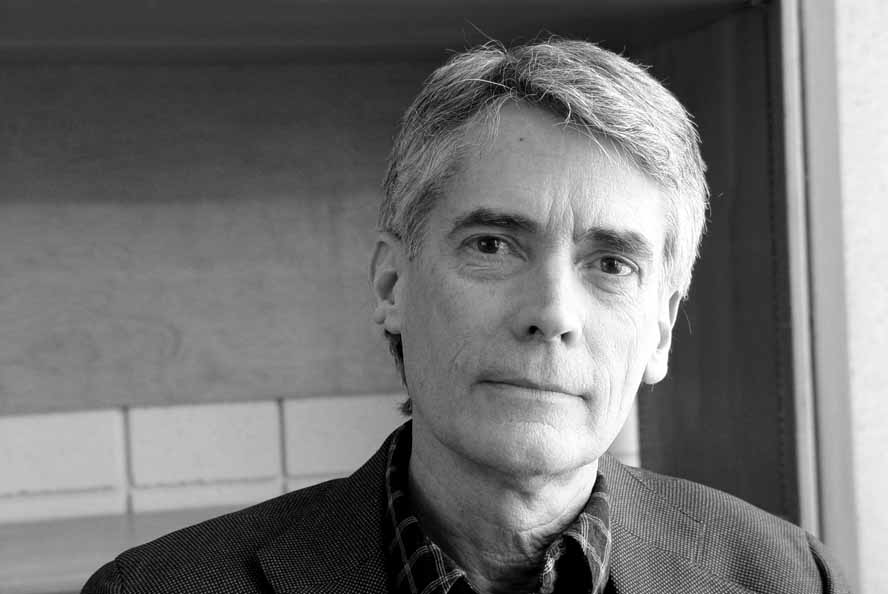
- Born: Lloyd Binford Ramke; February 19, 1947 (age 79); Port Neches, Texas, U.S.
- Education: Louisiana State University; University of New Orleans; Ohio University
- Occupations: Poet; editor

Lloyd Binford Ramke (born 19 February 1947 in Port Neches, Texas) is an American poet and editor.

== Life ==
He graduated from Louisiana State University, from University of New Orleans, and from Ohio University with a Ph.D. He taught at Columbus College.

He was editor of the University of Georgia Press's Contemporary Poetry Series, from 1984 to 2005, which he resigned from after Foetry.com learned that he was involved in the 1999 Contemporary Poetry series contest when series judge Jorie Graham selected the manuscript of Peter M. Sacks, her boyfriend at the time, whom she subsequently married.

He teaches at the University of Denver. He edited the literary magazine Denver Quarterly from 1994 to 2011. He lives in Denver with his wife, Linda, a fiction writer, and their son, Nic.

== Awards ==
- 1978 Yale Series of Younger Poets Competition
- 1994 Iowa Poetry Prize
- 1998 Iowa Poetry Prize

== Works ==
- The Difference Between Night and Day. Yale University Press. 1978. ISBN 978-0-300-02232-2.
- White Monkeys. University of Georgia Press. 1981. ISBN 978-0-8203-0544-8.
- The Language Student. Louisiana State University Press. 1986. ISBN 978-0-8071-1344-8.
- The Erotic Light of Gardens. Wesleyan University Press. 1989. ISBN 978-0-8195-2171-2.
- Massacre of the Innocents. University of Iowa Press. 1995. ISBN 978-0-87745-492-2.
- Wake. University of Iowa Press. 1999. ISBN 978-0-87745-658-2.
- Airs, Waters, Places. University of Iowa Press. 2001. ISBN 978-0-87745-776-3.
- Matter. University of Iowa Press. 2004. ISBN 978-0-87745-900-2.
- Tendril. Omnidawn Publishing. 2007. ISBN 978-1-890650-26-1.
- Theory of Mind: New & Selected Poems. Omnidawn Publishing. 2009. ISBN 978-1-89065-041-4.
- Aerial. Omnidawn Publishing. 2012. ISBN 978-1-89065-060-5.
- Missing the Moon. Omnidawn Publishing. 2014. ISBN 978-1-63243-000-7.

=== Anthologies ===
- Richard Howard; David Lehman, eds. (1995). "How Light is Spent". The Best American Poetry 1995. Simon and Schuster. ISBN 978-0-684-80151-3.
- Dave Smith; David Bottoms, eds. (1985). The Morrow anthology of younger American poets. Quill. ISBN 978-0-688-03450-4.
- Michael Collier; Stanley Plumly, eds. (1999). "A Little Ovid Late in the Day; A Livery of Seisin; A Theory of Fantasy". The new Bread Loaf anthology of contemporary American poetry. UPNE. ISBN 978-0-87451-950-1.

=== Criticism ===
- "Celebrating a World in Danger", Boston Review, 27.5
