= Clifton School (Durban) =

Private school in KwaZulu-Natal, South Africa

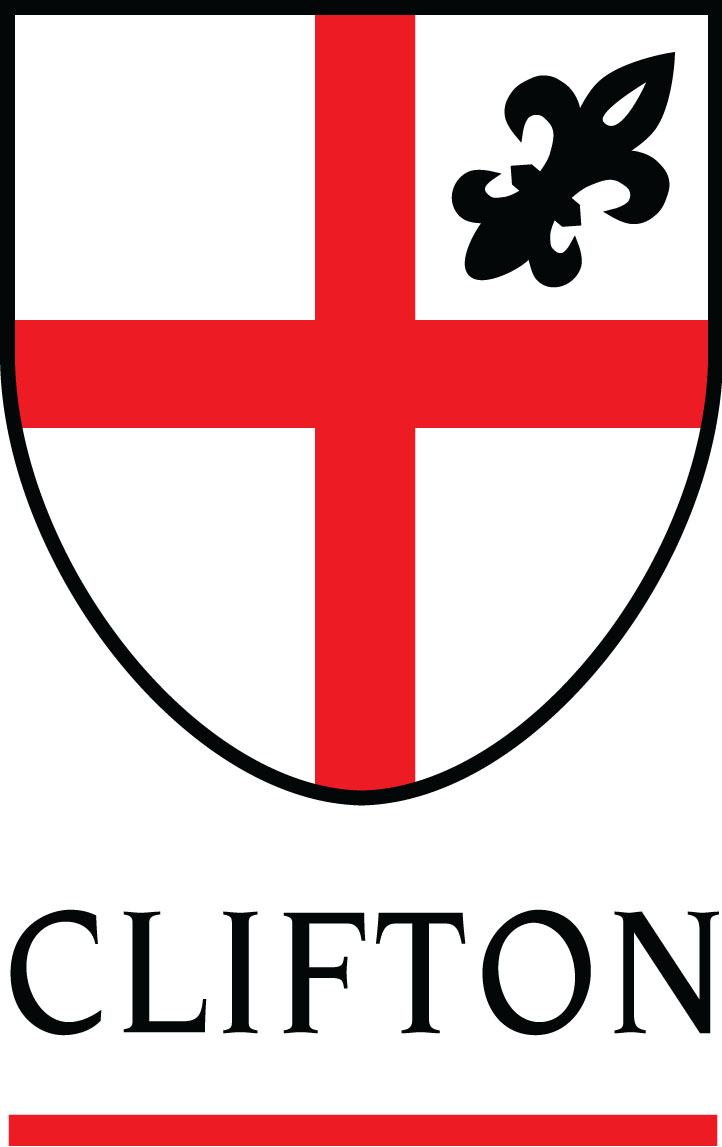

Location
- 102 Lambert Road; Durban, KwaZulu-Natal; South Africa
- 29.8296°S 31.0208°E

Information
- Type: Private school
- Motto: Prodesse Quam Conspici (To be humble in your achievements)
- Established: 1924
- Executive Headmaster: Adam Rogers
- Grades: Gr 00–12
- Enrollment: 940
- Campus type: Urban
- Colors: Red, black and white
- Song: We Listen For The Voices
- Website: www.cliftonschool.co.za

Clifton School (Durban) is an independent day school for boys in Durban, KwaZulu-Natal, South Africa.

== History ==
=== The early years ===
Mr Harry Stubbs, the retired first headmaster of Durban Preparatory High School (DPHS), established Clifton Preparatory School for boys on 5 February 1924. (In South African terminology a "preparatory" school is a primary school for children up to grade 8, or approximately thirteen years of age.) The Stubbs home, at 102 Lambert Road, provided the classrooms needed for the small numbers of boys who enrolled at the time. Although the school had at first been named ‘Stubbs School’, Mr Stubbs's daughter, Dorothy Stubbs, suggested the name ‘Clifton’, in memory of her cousin ‘Clifford’, who had been killed during the First World War. The original home still stands, and is known as "Stubbs House".

Miss Stubbs taught at Clifton for seven years until her marriage. Her position was filled by Miss Helen Fenell, who was visiting Durban on her way back to the United Kingdom after teaching in India. Miss Fenell taught at Clifton 1930-1931 but then left the school to marry Dr Billie Joseph. She remained in South Africa for the rest of her life and as Helen Joseph she went on to become a leading political activist against the apartheid system of racial segregation. She was placed under house arrest in 1962 and lived under a banning order for 23 years until she was 80, surviving anonymous gunshots and a bomb wired to her front gate. She died in 1992 at the age of 87 In 2020 the preparatory school library was named in her honour.

In the early years, boarding was offered, and boys slept in dormitories housed in the upstairs verandas, which were enclosed for the purpose. There were no sports fields at the time, and cricket and rugby were played at Kingsmead, the municipal sports grounds. Athletics meetings were held at the nearby Mitchell Park, and swimming took place at the municipal pool at the beach.

In 1938, with an enrollment of 60 boys, the school was purchased by Mr Kenneth Haworth. Because of parents' concerns over the possibility of enemy action, an air raid shelter was constructed at the school (later used as a changing room for the swimming pool`). By 1942 Haworth had succeeded in increasing enrollment to 160 pupils. In that year Haworth made two far-reaching decisions: to establish a separate Clifton preparatory school 115 km from Durban at Nottingham Road, where he would be headmaster; and to appoint Anthony Greenwood ("Tim") Sutcliffe as his successor to head the Clifton Durban School. By 1945, Haworth’s alcoholism made it impossible for him to remain at his post, and he was forced to sign an irrevocable power of attorney which authorized Tim Sutcliffe to form a trust to continue the two schools. Geoffrey Jenks was appointed headmaster of the Nottingham Road School and Tim Sutcliffe remained headmaster of the Durban school.

=== The Sutcliffe years ===
Mr Sutcliffe, an Oxford-educated history teacher at Hilton College was 27 years of age, and had no previous experience of teaching in a preparatory school. The Clifton he came to was situated on just 1-acre (0.40 ha) of ground, and his staff consisted of six female teachers.

Tim married Yolande D’Hotman, an actress and broadcaster, in 1944. But the Sutcliffe's lived largely separate lives and were never blessed with children, and successive generations of schoolboys constituted what was, in effect, his extended ‘Clifton’ family. Tim Sutcliffe was a visionary man of imposing stature who commanded awe and respect in pupils and teachers alike. He had a jovial and sardonic side, but he practised corporal punishment with enthusiasm. Sutcliffe caned boys hard and often, famously leaving welts that lasted two weeks or more. Sutcliffe had a passion for Shakespeare, and held the senior classes enthralled with his participatory style of introducing them to gory, action-packed excerpts from Julius Caesar, Hamlet and Macbeth! Though secular himself, he also taught the Bible, communicating his love of the sonorous language of the King James Version through vivid Old Testament passages that captured his pupils' imagination. Under his strong leadership Clifton quickly established a reputation for academic excellence and charged substantial tuition fees. The American poet and artist Peter Sacks, who was educated at Clifton, vividly recalled Sutcliffe's classroom theatrics and his corporal punishments some three decades after his schooling there.

During Sutcliffe'a tenure Clifton embarked on a period of extensive growth. As adjacent properties became available, they were purchased by the school, providing additional classrooms as well as housing for resident masters. In 1959 the school purchased a small hall from the Lambert Road Baptist Church, which was used as a school hall until 1974. By the mid-sixties, two 1-acre (0.40 ha) plots on Innes Road were bought and developed into a playing field, and a decade later, the Jubilee Hall was built at the Lambert Road entrance. When he retired, Sutcliffe had served Clifton in the capacity of Headmaster for 38 years. As a result of the property acquisitions he initiated, the school has sufficient space for sports fields and various other facilities.

=== 1980–2001 ===
Mr T.A. (Tom) Seymour was appointed as Headmaster in 1980. He came from Zimbabwe, where he had been head of the Bulawayo Teachers’ Training College. Unlike Sutcliffe, he had progressive views on discipline and he soon abolished the use of corporal punishment. Mr Seymour was also instrumental in allowing "non-white" children to enroll at the school, in defiance of the apartheid laws of the time.

In 1983 a second storey was added to the old bungalow housing the ‘Standard Three’ block, providing Clifton with a library and an adjoining projection room. Today Clifton's science laboratory occupies the top floor, above the existing classrooms. In the same year, cricket nets were erected on the top field and a block housing classrooms were converted into a Music Centre. Mr Seymour left Clifton in July 1984, and Mr Alan Pass, a teacher since 1955, took over the leadership until the appointment of Mr Kevin Whitehead in 1985.

Kevin Whitehead came to Clifton from Pridwin Preparatory School, in Johannesburg, where he had served as Deputy Headmaster. During his eighteen years at the helm, the school grew in numbers and in reputation. The number of academic scholarships burgeoned, going from but a single scholarship in 1984, to a record nineteen in 1999. Whitehead's passion for cricket was legendary and he was an outstanding coach of the game. He initiated the annual Clifton-United Kingdom cricket tour. Ill health forced him to retire prematurely in 2002.

=== From 2002: Clifton College ===
January 2002 saw the establishment of a secondary school on the site: Clifton College, with Mr Mike Thiel at the helm. It now became possible for boys to be educated entirely at Clifton at both preparatory school and high school level. By August of the same year, Mr Brian Mitchell had been appointed as Headmaster of the Prep School, and within eighteen months he took over the Headship of the whole school.

2006 saw the first Grade 12 Matriculation year. Clifton had achieved a milestone – the provision of thirteen years of education for pupils from Grade ‘R’ to Grade 12. In that year the Clifton Aquatics Centre was completed, comprising an Olympic size water polo pool. The management structure was changed to appoint a separate headmaster for the preparatory school. Michael Foster took up this post for two years.

In 2009 Hubert Goedeke was appointed principal of the college and Glenn Jones principal of the preparatory school, with Brian Mitchell serving as executive headmaster. In 2014 Glenn Jones left Clifton and was succeeded as principal of the preparatory school by Victor White in 2015. White was succeeded by Jason Brown in 2019. Brian Mitchell left in 2017 and was succeeded as executive headmaster by David Knowles in 2018.

Since 2014 the school has embarked on a long term development of the growing campus, with the vision of "a school in a garden in a city". The school is divided into four phases: Foundation Phase (Grade R-3), Senior Preparatory (Grade 4-7) and College (Grade 8-12). Clifton College writes the Independent Examinations Board exams. In 2023 the school added Grade 00 to its Foundation Phase, and the next year, it opened a boarding house to mark its Centenary year.

== Headmasters ==
=== Executive Headmasters ===
- Brian Mitchell (2009–2017)
- David Knowles (2018–2021)
- Clyde Mac Donald (2022-2025)
- Adam Rogers (2026-)

=== Preparatory School Principals ===
- Harry Stubbs (1924–1938)
- Kenneth Haworth (1938–1942)
- Anthony "Tim" Sutcliffe (1942–1980)
- T.A Seymour (1980–1984)
- Kevin Whitehead (1985–2002)
- Brian Mitchell (2002–2006)
- Michael Foster (2007–2009)
- Glenn Jones (2009–2014)
- Victor White (2015–2017)
- Jason Brown (2019–2025)
- Alan Angel (2026-)

=== College Principals ===
- Mike Thiel (2002–2004)
- Brian Mitchell (2005–2009)
- Hubert Goedeke (2009-2019)

== Notable alumni ==
- Patrick Lambie, South African rugby player
- Tony Leon, former Leader of the Democratic Alliance
- Matthew Meyer, Olympic swimmer
- Barry Richards (cricketer)
- The Rt Revd Philip Russell, Archbishop of Cape Town
- Peter M. Sacks, American poet and artist
- Robin Smith (cricketer)
- Shaun Tomson, world champion surfer
- Andrew Tweedie, cricketer
- Brad Wheal, cricketer
- Blxckie, rapper
- Senuran Muthusamy, cricketer
