= Jeannette Montgomery Barron =

American photographer (born 1956)

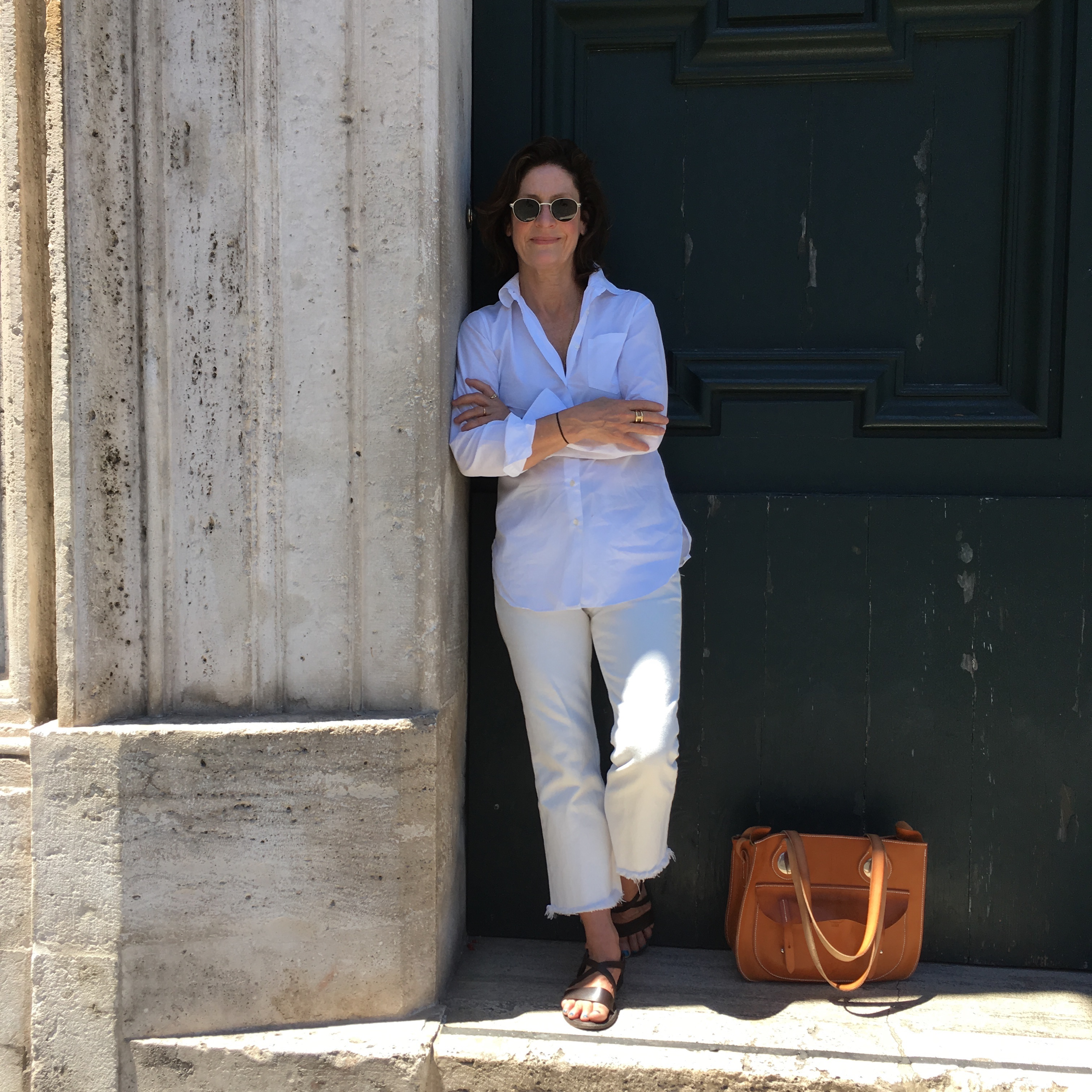
- Born: 1956 (age 69–70); Atlanta, Georgia
- Occupation: Photographer

Jeannette Montgomery Barron (born 1956 in Atlanta, Georgia) is an American photographer.

== Education ==
Montgomery Barron studied at the International Center of Photography in New York City.

== Works ==
Her photography works are held in public and corporate collections. Notable collections located at the Museum of Modern Art and the Whitney Museum of American Art.

She has published a number of books including My Mother's Clothes celebrating her mother's fashion interests. She authored other books focusing on art and fashion celebrities, including:

- Jeannette Montgomery Barron : my years in the 1980s New York art scene
- Jeannette Montgomery Barron Photographs
- Scene
- Photographs & Poems (poems by Jorie Graham)
