= Cambridge Public School District =

School district in Massachusetts, United States

Address
- 135 Berkshire Street Cambridge, Middlesex County, Massachusetts, 02141; United States
- Coordinates: 42°22′18″N 71°05′25″W

District information
- Type: Public
- Motto: Empowering Student Excellence
- Grades: Pre-K through 12
- Superintendent: David Murphy
- School board: 7 members
- Chair of the board: Mayor
- Governing agency: Massachusetts Department of Education
- Accreditation: New England Association of Schools and Colleges (NEASC)
- Schools: Elementary 12, Upper 4, High school 1, High school extension 1
- Budget: 268.3M (2025) ($36,356 per pupil)
- NCES District ID: 2503270
- District ID: 00490000

Students and staff
- Students: 7,027
- Teachers: 762.8
- Staff: 1,834
- Student–teacher ratio: 9:1
- Athletic conference: MIAA
- District mascot: Falcons
- Colors: Black, Silver, and White

Other information
- Schedule: M-F except state holidays
- Website: www.cpsd.us

The Cambridge Public School District (CPSD or Cambridge Public Schools, CPS), is a school district serving Cambridge, Massachusetts in Greater Boston, in the United States. The mission of the school district is "Cambridge Public Schools delivers an excellent education that inspires, acknowledges, empowers, and supports every student on their personal journey to achieve their highest potential in and beyond school and as productive members of their communities."

== History ==
In 2003, the Cambridge Rindge and Latin School (CRLS), also known as Rindge School, came close to losing its educational accreditation when it was placed on probation by the New England Association of Schools and Colleges. The school has improved under Principal Chris Saheed; graduation rates hover around 98%, and 70% of students gain college admission.

In 2006 James Conry, the district's chief financial officer said that the district had a projected $4.9 million surplus due to a high state reimbursement from the Circuit Breaker program.

In July 2023, the Boston Globe reported that some parents had removed their children from the school district because it had stopped offering Algebra 1 to eighth grade students.

== School Committee ==
The Cambridge School Committee oversees Cambridge Public Schools, which is currently headed by superintendent David Murphy. Murphy's Assistant Superintendent is Elaine Carrieri. The School Committee, as of January 2025, is composed of the following elected members: Chairman David Weinstein, Vice-Chair Caitlin Dube, Luisa de Paula Santos, Richard Harding, Jr., Elizabeth Hudson, Arjun Jaikumar, and Sumbul Siddiqui. The School Committee controls the majority of municipal spending. The school district is further supported by other leadership.

== Schools ==
The district, as of 2022, has twelve elementary schools, with ten schools with grade levels JK-5, one English-Spanish dual immersion school with grades JK-8, and a Montessori school serving age 3 to grade 5. It has four upper schools and one full high school program. The district enrolled 7,027 students in the 2024-2025 school year.

=== High schools ===
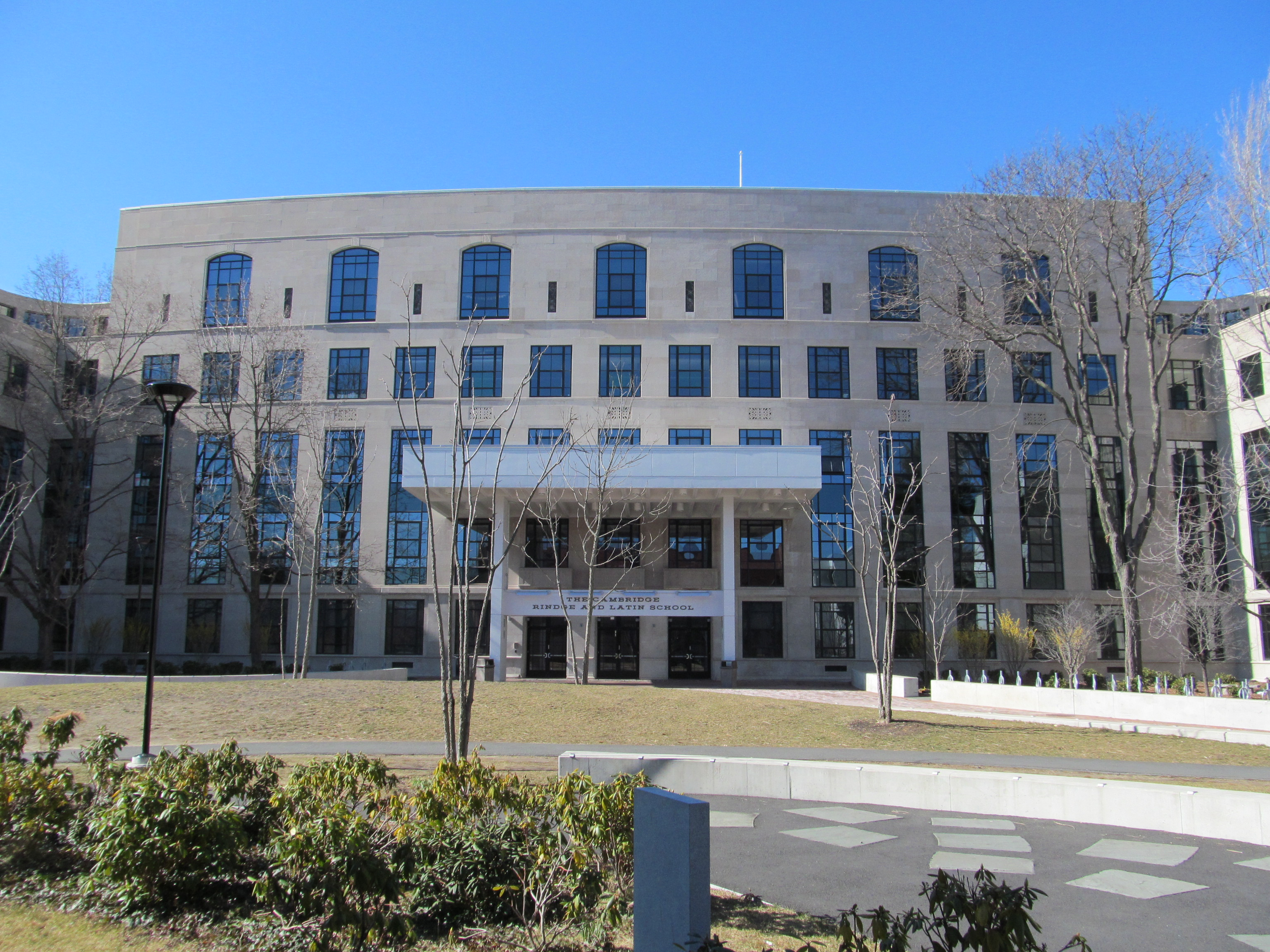
Cambridge Rindge & Latin School

- Cambridge Rindge & Latin School
- Career & Technical Education/Rindge School of Technical Arts (RSTA)
- High School Extension Program

=== K-8 schools ===
- Amigos School

=== Upper schools ===
- Cambridge Street Upper School
- Putnam Avenue Upper School
- Rindge Avenue Upper School
- Darby Vassall Upper School

=== Elementary schools ===
- Baldwin
- Cambridgeport
  - The school opened in 1990. In 1997 Mary Lou McGrath, the superintendent, proposed closing Cambridgeport School. The school stayed open, and since circa 2001 it occupies the ex-Fletcher School.
- Fletcher-Maynard Academy
- Graham & Parks Alternative Public School
- Haggerty
- Kennedy-Longfellow School
- Dr. Martin Luther King, Jr.
- King Open
- Morse School
- Peabody
- Tobin Montessori

== See also ==
- List of school districts in Massachusetts
- Charter schools in the United States
