= Saundra Graham =

American politician (1940/1941–2023)

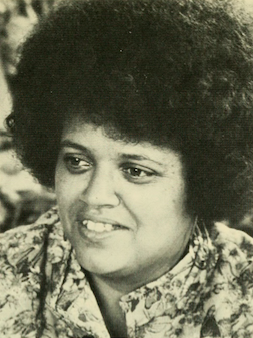
- Graham circa 1977

Member of the Cambridge City Council
- In office 1971–1989

Member of the Massachusetts House of Representatives from the 4th Middlesex district
- In office 1977–1988

Personal details
- Born: September 5, 1941
- Died: June 23, 2023 (aged 81)

Saundra Mae (Postell) Graham (September 5, 1941 – June 23, 2023) was an American independent politician and community activist from Cambridge, Massachusetts. She served as a Cambridge City Councilor from 1971 to 1989, becoming the first Black woman to serve in the city of Cambridge. She also represented the 4th Middlesex district in the Massachusetts House of Representatives from 1977 to 1988.

== Early life ==
Saundra Graham was born in Cambridge, Massachusetts to Roberta and Charles Postell. She was raised in the Riverside neighborhood and attended local schools, the Houghton School and Cambridge Rindge and Latin School. Continuing her education at the University of Massachusetts Boston and Harvard Extension School.

== Career ==
In 1968, Graham became a member of the Cambridge Community Center’s board of directors. Two years later, she was chosen as president of the Riverside Planning Team, a group of housing activists in the Cambridge neighborhood of Riverside. In 1970, the Riverside Planning Team interrupted Harvard's commencement ceremony, and Graham stormed the stage and demanded that the university dedicate land in Riverside which had been set aside for a planned dorm to low-income housing. Members of the Harvard Corporation met with Graham and the activists, and after several hours they reached an agreement in which the university would build low-income housing on a different site. The following year, Graham was elected the first African-American woman on the Cambridge City Council, and she went on to become the first Black woman to represent Cambridge in the state legislature.

The Graham and Parks School in Cambridge is named for her and Rosa Parks.

Graham died on June 23, 2023, at the age of 81.
