= Matthew Meyer =

South African swimmer (born 1998)

Personal information
- Born: 4 March 1998 (age 28)
- Height: 185 cm (6 ft 1 in)
- Weight: 70 kg (154 lb)

Sport
- Sport: Swimming

Matthew Mark Meyer (born 4 March 1998) is a South African swimmer. He competed in the men's 1500 metre freestyle event at the 2016 Summer Olympics. He finished 41st in the heats with a time of 15:36.22. He did not qualify for the final. Meyer went to school at Clifton College, Durban.
