= Gamut: Journal of the Georgia Association of Music Theorists =

- Discipline: Music theory and musical analysis
- Language: English

Publication details
- History: 1984–2001

Standard abbreviations
- ISO 4: Gamut

Indexing
- ISSN: 1098-2655

Gamut: Journal of the Georgia Association of Music Theorists (ISSN 1098-2655) was a peer-reviewed, academic journal specializing in music theory and analysis. It began publication in 1984, under the auspices of the Georgia Association of Music Theorists; it ceased publication in 2001 (vol. 10). The journal's first editor was Susan Tepping; its final editor was Kristin Wendland.

Because the title word "gamut" was not just a musical term but also an acronym of the sponsoring organization, it was rendered in uppercase in the journal itself, but citations usually give the title word with an initial capital only.

Although the journal no longer exists as such, it was in some sense adopted and relaunched as Gamut: The Journal of the Music Theory Society of the Mid-Atlantic. As the editor proclaimed in the first issue (2008) of the latter journal: "Once the journal of the now disbanded Georgia Association of Music Theorists (GAMUT), Gamut came under the auspices of [the Music Theory Society of the Mid-Atlantic] in 2005 at the suggestion of Kristin Wendland, that journal's founding editor [sic]. Shortly thereafter, the Publications Committee and membership of MTSMA decided to reintroduce Gamut as an online journal." However, the volume and issue numbering was restarted from the beginning, and (other than the editor's notice) the new Gamut has no tangible connection with the old one.
