= Dennis Wilder =

American intelligence official

- Other names: 韋德寧/韦德宁
- Education: Kalamazoo College (BA), Georgetown University School of Foreign Service (MS)
- Occupations: Professor; former senior intelligence official
- Employer: Georgetown University School of Foreign Service

Dennis Craig Wilder is a former senior American intelligence official currently serving as a professor of practice at Georgetown University's School of Foreign Service and a senior fellow of Georgetown's Initiative for US-China Dialogue on Global Issues, where he previously served as managing director. He is a member of the National Committee on US-China Relations.

== Education ==
Wilder holds a BA from Kalamazoo College and a MS in foreign service from Georgetown University School of Foreign Service. He studied Mandarin Chinese at the Chinese University of Hong Kong during the 1975–1976 academic year with support from Yale-in-China.

== Career ==
During the George W. Bush administration, Wilder served as Director for China at the White House National Security Council (NSC) from 2004 to 2005. Later he became special assistant to the president and senior director for East Asian affairs from 2005 to 2009, accompanying a series of presidential trips to Asia, including the 2008 Olympics in Beijing. Subsequently, Wilder joined the Brookings Institution's John L. Thornton China Center as a senior fellow.

During the Obama administration, Wilder was senior editor of the President's Daily Brief from 2009 to 2015 and served as CIA's deputy assistant director for East Asia and the Pacific from 2015 to 2016.

== Publications ==
=== Books ===
- An Educated Consumer Is Our Best Customer, Center for the Study of Intelligence, CIA, June 2011

=== Articles ===
- The U.S.-China Strategic and Economic Dialogue: Continuity and Change in Obama's China Policy, China Brief, Jamestown Foundation, May 15, 2009
