= Amigos School =

Location
- 15 Upton Street; Cambridge, MA 02139; United States; 42°21′47″N 71°06′30″W

Information
- Type: bilingual, primary, public
- Established: 2001
- School district: Cambridge Public School District
- Principal: Sarah Bartels-Marrero
- Faculty: 31
- Grades: K-8
- Affiliations: Shore Educational Collaborative
- Website: http://amigos.cpsd.us/

The Amigos School or La Escuela Amigos School, is a dual-language immersion bilingual Kindergarten to eighth (k-8) school in Cambridge, Massachusetts, United States. The Spanish-immersion program began in 1986 at the Maynard School and became an autonomous school within the Cambridge Public School District in 2001.

== History ==
The Amigos School began as a Spanish immersion program in 1986 at the Maynard School. During the 1990s it outgrew its allotted space at the Maynard building, housing its K-3 students at Maynard and grades 4-8 at the Robert F. Kennedy School building until the grades were consolidated at Kennedy.

The program became an autonomous school within the Kennedy School building in 2001 by a vote of the Cambridge School Committee. Marla Pérez-Selles, assistant director of the Cambridge Public School District's bilingual program, was appointed the first principal of the school.

Bilingual students housed at the Longfellow School were incorporated with Amigos in 2002 and in the 2003-04 academic year, as a result of the School Consolidation Plan passed by the Cambridge School Committee, the Amigos School moved to the King School building. As a result of the 2012 Cambridge School reorganization The Amigos School moved to 15 Upton Street, Cambridge, MA. Subsequent to this reorganization it remains the sole K-8 school in the district.

== Curriculum ==
The Amigos School uses a dual-language immersion model, which gives students half of their instruction in English and the other half in Spanish. The three major goals of the Amigos School are that all students become bilingual and bi-literate, develop cross cultural understanding, and provide an environment for families to share their cultural heritage.

The school enjoys a high level of community involvement in day-to-day activities at the school, such as Harvard's CityStep, "reading buddies" who visit the school weekly to read aloud to students.

== Extracurricular activities ==
After school programs are offered through the Community School to the community and students at the Amigos School. Other activities include Science Club for Girls, The School of Honk, and a CitySprouts garden.
