= Harvard Interactive Media Group =

Harvard College Interactive Media Group logo

The Harvard College Interactive Media Group is a student club at Harvard dedicated to the promotion of interactive media studies, the academic analysis of video games and other new media. The group, founded in 2006, acts as an umbrella group for various projects around the Harvard campus and in the greater Boston area.

== Projects ==
HCIMG's most visible on-campus events have been the Multiplay gatherings, an ongoing series of gaming tournaments at Harvard. The first tournament, hosted at Lamont Library in March 2007, attracted over 175 students from all over Boston and Cambridge, including MIT, Boston University and Worcester Polytechnic Institute, as well as, of course, many Harvard students.

The group has also published the Harvard Interactive Media Review. The first issue featured content from media studies professors, game designers, students, and others. It was released in print and online in 2007, but there has not been a second issue.

Other projects include a group specifically devoted to student game design and development, as well as the establishment of a permanent gaming space at Harvard.
