= Graham and Parks School =

Public elementary school in Cambridge, Massachusetts

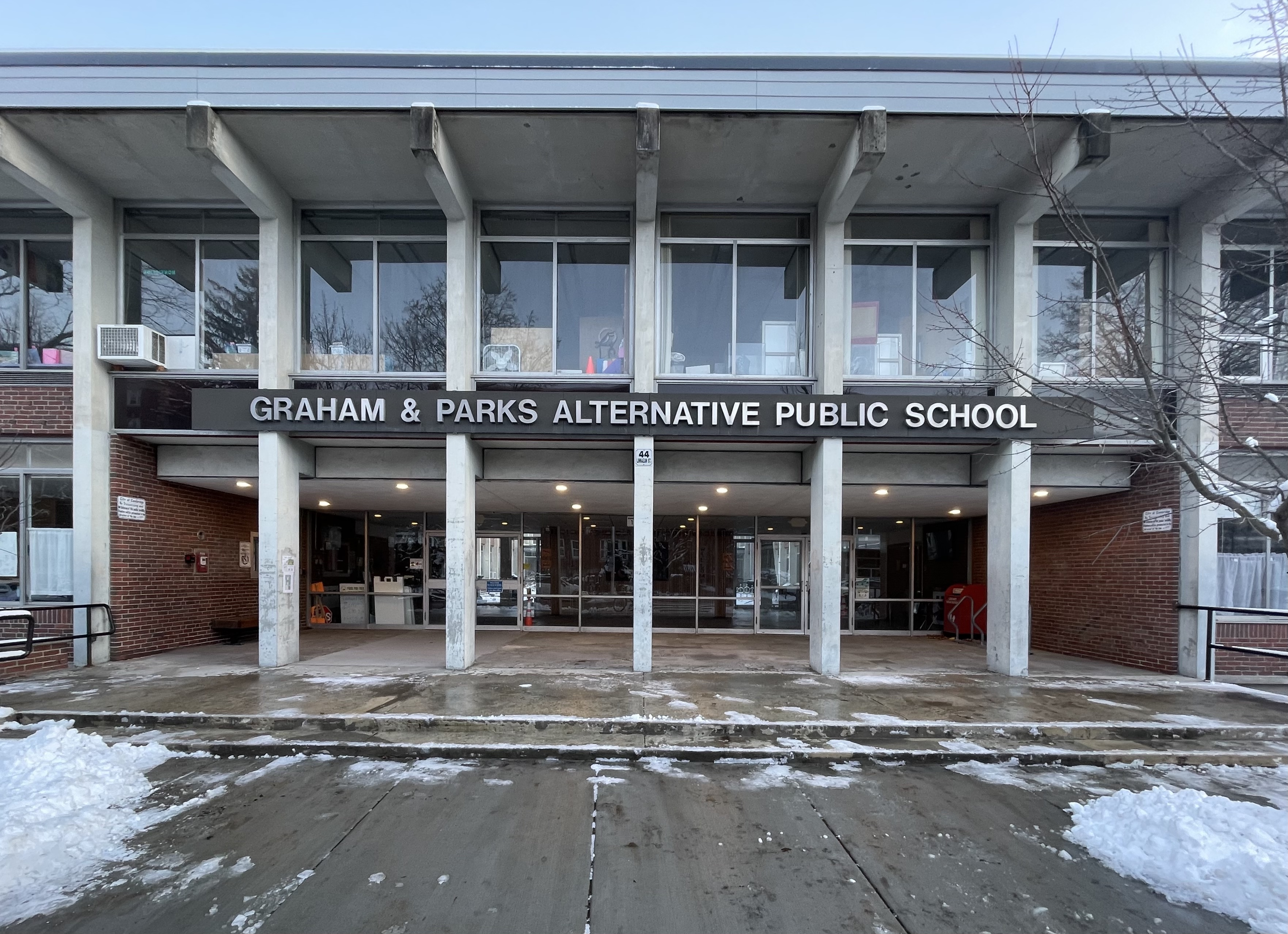

Location
- 44 Linnaean Street; Cambridge, Massachusetts 02138; 42°22′58″N 71°07′26″W

Information
- School type: Public
- Established: 1981
- School district: Cambridge Public School District
- Principal: Kathleen M. Smith
- Grades: Pre-K–5
- Website: https://grahamandparks.cpsd.us/

The Graham and Parks School is a public elementary school in Cambridge, Massachusetts, and a part of the Cambridge Public School District. Founded in 1981, the school was originally conceived as an "alternative school" aligned with the progressive education movement. It historically emphasized project-based learning, teacher-led curriculum development, and parent involvement in all aspects of school operation. Since the early 2000s, state curriculum guidelines and local policy changes have diminished these aspects of the school's identity, bringing it in line with city and state standards. The school is named for Rosa Parks and Saundra Graham, a welfare and housing advocate from Cambridge.

== History ==
The school originated from the merger of two distinct educational institutions in 1981: the Cambridge Alternative Public School (CAPS) and the Webster School. CAPS, established in 1972 by a group of parents, was a small, nationally acclaimed magnet school with a progressive educational philosophy. The Webster School was a traditional neighborhood school. Following their consolidation, the unified school operated on Upton Street from 1982 until 2003, after which it relocated to 44 Linnaean Street. The school originally ran from kindergarten through eighth grade; in 2011, the Cambridge School Committee voted to move the sixth through eighth grades into a separate middle school.

== Demographics ==
During the 1980s, the school was approximately half white and half children of color. In the 1990s, as Cambridge became more racially diverse, the proportion of children of color in the school rose to about 60%. Approximately half the students at the time were eligible for free or reduced-price lunch. In the early 2000s, the school became increasingly white and affluent; by 2007, white families made up more than half the school. As of 2023, the school was 50.3% white, 21.5% Asian, 13.9% Black, and 7.3% multi-racial.

== Curriculum ==
From its inception, the school prioritized teacher-led curriculum development. Len Solo, who served as the school's principal from its founding until the early 2000s, explained the approach: "We encourage our teachers to develop their own curriculum. In fact, we feel it is a strength of our school. People here have a lot of passion for what they teach. Their excitement inspires kids to learn."

A key component of the curriculum for the school's first two decades was the Creole bilingual education program serving Haitian immigrants. The program ended after a statewide referendum in 2002 barred bilingual education programs across Massachusetts.

Since the early 2000s, the curriculum at Graham and Parks has increasingly been determined by district and state mandates. A 2013 article on Graham and Parks in the Berkeley Review of Education described how the efforts of teachers to address the "socio-emotional, developmental, and cultural needs" of students were increasingly in tension with the "narrow limits of the traditional mandates" imposed by the district and state.

== Performance ==
During the first two decades of its existence, the school did not place an emphasis on standardized test preparation, but its results on statewide tests were nonetheless among the best in Massachusetts. As of 2024, on the statewide MCAS exams, 54% of students were meeting or exceeding expectations in English language arts and 58% were meeting or exceeding expectations in math.

== Controversy ==
In 2024, parents raised concerns about the hiring and conduct of principal Kathleen M. Smith. A petition signed by more than 100 parents called for greater transparency in communication from Smith and greater inclusion of both families and teachers in school decision making. Parents faulted Smith for creating a "tense" and "toxic" atmosphere, alleging that teachers and staff felt "targeted" and "disrespected" by the principal. A public records request revealed that Smith had left her previous position as principal of the Underwood Elementary School in Newton, MA after an investigation concluded that she had created a "toxic working environment" for teachers. Parents faulted district leadership for a lack of transparency and rigor in the hiring process for the principal. The district Superintendent, Victoria Greer, was forced to leave her position after facing criticism for her hiring of Smith and other administrators. The district then commissioned an investigation of Smith by an outside law firm; the report was not publicly released, but interim Superintendent David Murphy stated that it "does not support a finding of a toxic workplace." A district-wide survey in 2024 revealed that only 14% of teachers at Graham and Parks described the school as a positive work environment; the result was the lowest of all 12 elementary schools in the district.

In 2025, a longtime substitute teacher and volunteer at Graham and Parks filed a discrimination suit against the district, alleging that Principal Smith had blocked her from substituting in the school because she is in a wheelchair; the suit further alleges that four days after the teacher questioned the principal's decision, Smith barred her from volunteering in the building. In internal emails obtained during discovery, Principal Smith reportedly referred to the fact that the person was in a wheelchair when explaining why the person could not teach in the school. "This person is in a wheelchair with significant mobility challenges," Smith wrote to district administrators, adding that the district policy is to block substitutes who have "not created a safe learning environment for students." The school district renewed Smith's contract as principal in the spring of 2026, prompting criticism from parents and teachers who voiced concern about the discrimination suit and a general lack of trust in school leadership.

== Lottery data ==
The school has long been one of the most popular choices among families in Cambridge's "controlled choice" lottery system. However, between 2022 and 2025, Graham and Parks went from one of the most popular schools in the district to one of the least popular schools. During that period, it experienced the largest change in demand among all elementary schools in the district, and it was the only school to experience a significant decline in the number of families seeking a placement for their child.
