= The Kuumba Singers of Harvard College =

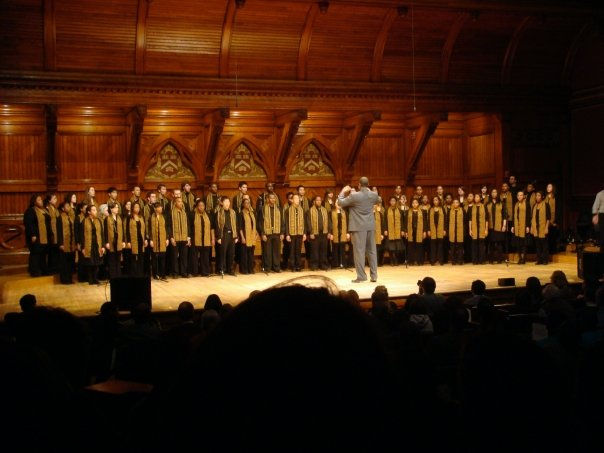
The Kuumba Singers in Spring Concert 2009

The Kuumba Singers of Harvard College (founded in 1970) is the oldest existing Black organization at Harvard College. With concerts held during both the winter and the spring of each year, along with many other performances and a spring tour.

== About Kuumba ==
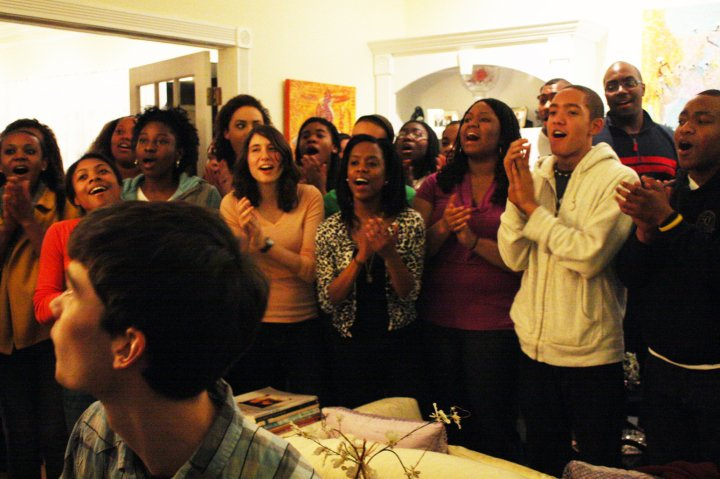
The Kuumba Singers on tour in Atlanta

Kuumba (pronounced koo-oom-bah) was founded in 1970 by Dennis Wiley and Fred Lucas, two African American undergraduates of the Harvard class of 1972. In an era of “Black Power” and Black pride, immediately following the 1968 assassination of the Rev. Dr. Martin Luther King Jr. and the 1969 Harvard Strike, the choir emerged as a source of community, spiritual inspiration, political motivation and cultural stimulation among the small but growing number of Black students at Harvard. Inspired by the History of Black Music class taught by Professor Hubert Walters in the spring of 1970, the choir concept was conceived that summer as an outgrowth of a project on Black music conducted by Dennis and Fred and supported by the newly established Department of African and African American Studies and African American Cultural Center.

The next fall, Marilynn Sasportas, Radcliffe Class of 1974, joined them in Quincy 317 to assist in planning and publicizing the first rehearsal. The Kuumba Singers were officially born in November 1970 when students from the classes of 1971 -1974 gathered for the first time one evening after dinner in a second floor lounge of the old Freshman Union, now known as the Barker Center. Following that initial meeting, Walters would assume responsibility as the choir's first director. The first spring concert, entitled “An Evening of Black Spirituality,” was held in Sanders Theater on Sunday, May 16, 1971.

It was not easy for Black students to “sing the Lord’s song” in the “strange land” of Harvard during this period of racial tension and campus unrest. Yet, Kuumba not only provided spiritual inspiration—it was also a source of unity and strength. The group chose the name “Kuumba” (Swahili for “creativity”) because it best captured the choir's intent to reflect the creative genius of Black people through the rich diversity of Diasporic music and cultural expression. As written in the organization's constitution, “Black music is a manifestation of the Black spirit – it speaks to our every emotion. Moreover, Black music helps sustain and direct our culture.”

Since those early years, the torch has been carried forward by only two additional directors, Mr. Robert Winfrey and Mr. Sheldon K.X. Reid (College ’96, GSE ’98), and by more than 1,000 Kuumba members and alumni.

== Kuumba Name and Mission ==
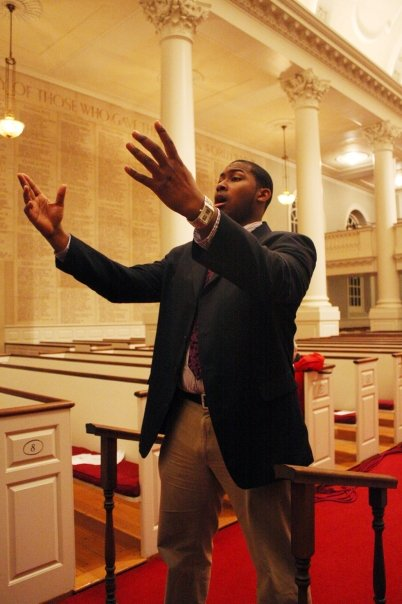

Kuumba’s founders chose the name “Ku’umba” over the original more constrictive name, “Harvard-Radcliffe Gospel Choir” because it allowed for all modes of Diasporic expression. In Swahili, Ku’umba roughly means creativity [or to create], though the literal meaning is subtler: it is the creativity of leaving a space better than you found it; it is the spirit of positively impacting through modes of creativity.

== Kuumba's Early Political Climate ==
The late 1960s and early 1970s found Black students at Harvard to be few in number, and as such alienated from much of that institution. With curriculum that did not foster the perspective of the Black experience and a campus that was at times even hostile to the presence of its Black students, Harvard showed an unwelcoming hand to those that it admitted during these times. Yet, despite Harvard's isolating environment, the tides of Black Pride and Black Power pushed Black students on campus to fight for institutional structures that would allow students of African descent a space to commune with their culture in a way that held them accountable to their past and present as Black members of society. The products of this fight were a Department of Afro-American Studies, an Afro-American Cultural Center, and creative cultural groups including the Kuumba Singers. What was so powerful about the Kuumba Singers was the connection it created between Black culture and Black spirituality. The group helped fill-in a gap that had been missing for many of its members at Harvard.

Yet more than just for Harvard students, Kuumba in the 70s was designed to be a space for Black students from all over Boston to join. The organization wished for diversity that would unify the African American community across boundaries of class, gender, denomination, age, and other institutional road-blocks. With that, members from neighboring colleges found a home on Harvard's campus with Kuumba.

During the political times of the 70s, Kuumba was found at many political demonstrations, supporting the rights of Black people locally as well as globally. In fact, it was these political tensions of the global arena that caused Mr. Hubert Walters, the first director of the choir (who was succeeded by Robert Winfrey when Walters's contract was not renewed by the College), to implement the tradition of singing “Nkosi Sikelel' iAfrika,” a freedom song of South Africa later to be the South African national anthem.

The 1970s saw the creation of the annual Weekend of Black Spirituality, a celebration of the end of Kuumba's performance year and featured guest choirs, culminating in Kuumba's spring concert. This tradition continued through the 70s under the leadership of Robert Winfrey, the director that stayed with Kuumba for 25 years.

== Kuumba Now ==
Kuumba continues to distinguish itself as more than a singing group. While the political climate of the organization has changed on Harvard's campus, the organization maintains its role as a safe space for Black students on campus, responding to inequality issues as they arise. For instance, in 2002, members of Kuumba Singers protested comments made by a Harvard professor concerning the term of ebonics. While the organization is not exclusively Black in its membership, the mission of expressing Black creativity and spirituality remains at the center of all that the group does.

=== Performances, Concerts, and Tours ===
Each year, the group participates several gigs throughout both on and off campus. In recent times, those gigs have included singing at the presentation of Ted Kennedy's Honorary Degree, performing with Bobby McFerrin at Boston's Symphony Hall, along with participating in the benefit concert for Haiti. Other unrequested gigs that are put on by the organization itself include its own concerts, the Black Arts Festival performance showcase, and the Harvard-Yale Body & Soul Showcase run by Kuumba on the years in which the Harvard-Yale football game takes place on Harvard's soil.

The Kuumba Singers hold a large concert at the end of each academic semester. The winter concert is dedicated to Dr. S. Allen Counter, the executive director of the Harvard Foundation and a strong supporter and advocate for Kuumba throughout Kuumba's history. This concert occurs on two nights in Harvard's Memorial Church and is free to the public. This concert celebrates to the true meaning of Christmas and the birth of Jesus, with infusions of music and performance from the African diaspora throughout the concert. The spring concert, dedicated to Dean Archie C. Epps in remembrance of his spirited resistance to the organization, is held on one night towards the end of the spring semester. This concert takes place in Harvard University's Sanders Theater.

Each spring break, the Kuumba Singers go on tour. Several of the most recent tours have taken place in Philadelphia, Washington, D.C., Atlanta, Bermuda, and New York City. During tour, Kuumba sings at a variety of locations, including colleges, middle and high schools, churches, and community centers in the area.

=== Black Arts Festival ===
Founded in 1998 by Phillip Atiba Goff, the Dr. Walter J. Leonard Black Arts Festival features various workshops, performances, and displays of many forms of artwork including film, spoken word, short plays, and dance. Since the time of its founding, the festival has expanded to encompass Black art created not only by Harvard students but also by artists in the Boston and Cambridge community. The Black Arts Festival of 2010 (Chair: Bolaji Ogunsola) was created with the theme of Sankofa, a Ghanaian symbol roughly translated to mean “go back and take.” The Black Arts Festival of 2011 (Chair: Hannah Joy Habte) was created with the theme of "How It Feels to be Colored Me," named after and inspired by the famous Zora Neale Hurston essay. In 2012 (Chair: Jowanna Malone), the festival was called "Living for More than Just Me."

=== Alumni Association ===
In 2009, the Alumni of the Kuumba Singers of Harvard College was founded under the leadership of Linda Sowell ’73 as a Shared Interest Group of the Harvard Alumni Association. This association works to support the current Kuumba members as well as to create a way for past Kuumba members to stay in contact with each other.
