= CityStep =

CityStep is a dancing program, using undergraduate students to teach dance to students in city schools with under-funded arts programs.

== History ==
The program was founded in Cambridge, Massachusetts in 1983 by recent Harvard University graduate Sabrina Peck. Approximately 75 undergraduates work together to serve over 100 Cambridge public school children annually. Some participant Cambridge public schools are the Amigos School, the Morse School and the Kennedy-Longfellow School.

In the program's first year, Peck traveled to four schools twice a week to teach 85 fifth and sixth grade students. By the third year, Peck transitioned the program to student leaders, with over 80 undergraduates auditioning for the programs 32 teaching spots.

In 2004, CityStep expanded to the Philadelphia, Pennsylvania, with 40 undergraduates from the University of Pennsylvania working with local public and charter school students.

The program introduces city students to the arts with in-school dance programs designed to help them compose and produce an annual dance show.
