= Jorie Graham =

American poet (born 1950)

- Graham at the Politics and Prose bookstore in Washington, D.C. (2026)
- Born: Jorie Pepper; May 9, 1950 (age 76); New York City, U.S.
- Education: New York University (BFA); University of Iowa (MFA)
- Occupation: poet
- Spouses: William Graham (divorced); James Galvin (m. 1983; div. 1999); Peter M. Sacks (m. 2000)
- Children: 1
- Parents: Curtis Bill Pepper (father); Beverly Stoll (mother)
- Website: joriegraham.com

Jorie Graham (née Pepper; born May 9, 1950) is an American poet. The Poetry Foundation called Graham "one of the most celebrated poets of the American post-war generation." She replaced poet Seamus Heaney as Boylston Professor of Rhetoric and Oratory at Harvard University, becoming the first woman to be appointed to this position. She won the Pulitzer Prize for Poetry (1996) for The Dream of the Unified Field: Selected Poems 1974-1994 and was chancellor of the Academy of American Poets from 1997 to 2003. She won the 2013 International Nonino Prize in Italy.

== Early life and education ==
Graham was born in New York City in 1950 to Curtis Bill Pepper, a war correspondent and the head of the Rome bureau for Newsweek magazine, and the sculptor Beverly Stoll Pepper. She and her brother John Randolph Pepper were raised in Rome, Italy. She studied philosophy at the Sorbonne in Paris, but was expelled for participating in student protests. She completed her undergraduate work as a film major at New York University, and became interested in poetry during that time. (She claims that her interest was sparked while walking past M.L. Rosenthal's classroom and overhearing the last couplet of "The Love Song of J. Alfred Prufrock" ). After working as a secretary, she later went on to receive her Master of Fine Arts from the Iowa Writers' Workshop at the University of Iowa.

== Career ==
Graham is the author of numerous collections of poetry, including notable volumes like The End of Beauty, The Dream of the Unified Field: Selected Poems 1974-1994, Sea Change, P L A C E, From the New World: Poems 1976–2014, Fast, and Runaway. She has also edited two anthologies, Earth Took of Earth: 100 Great Poems of the English Language (1996) and The Best American Poetry 1990. She is widely anthologized and her poetry is the subject of many essays, including Jorie Graham: Essays on the Poetry (2005). The Poetry Foundation considers Graham's third book, The End of Beauty (1987), to have been a "watershed" book in which Graham first used the longer verse line for which she is best known. Graham's many honors include a Whiting Award (1985), the John D. and Catherine T. MacArthur Fellowship, an Ingram Merrill Fellowship, The Morton Dauwen Zabel Award from The American Academy and Institute of Arts and Letters and the Whiting Award. The Dream of the Unified Field: Selected Poems 1974–1994 won the 1996 Pulitzer Prize for Poetry. Her collection of poetry P L A C E won the 2012 Forward Poetry Prize for best collection, becoming the first American woman ever to win one of the UK's most prestigious poetry accolades. P L A C E was also shortlisted for the 2012 T. S. Eliot Prize. In 2013, Graham became only the third American to win the International Nonino Prize. In 2015, From the New World: Selected Poems 1976–2014—a collection from all prior eleven volumes plus new work—was published by HarperCollins/Ecco Press. In 2016 From the New World won the Los Angeles Times Book Prize for Poetry.

In 2017, Graham received the Wallace Stevens Award from the Academy of American Poets. Given annually to recognize outstanding and proven mastery in the art of poetry, recipients are nominated and elected by a majority vote of the Academy's Board of Chancellors. She won the 2018 Bobbitt National Prize for Poetry for Fast.

About Jorie Graham, Academy of American Poets Chancellor Claudia Rankine said: "Jorie Graham's masterful poems traverse almost four decades of inquiry into what it means to be in relation. Her work pulls forward our mythical, historical, environmental, and personal narratives in order to inhabit our most ordinary and collective experiences. Hers is the patience of the return; repetition in her work unearths the nuances of fundamental desires to live, to love, to be. Clear-eyed and with a scope that encompasses what is both known and unknown, her 15 collections have built towards a brilliant insistence on presence."

She served as a Chancellor of The Academy of American Poets from 1997 to 2003.

Graham has held a longtime faculty position at the Iowa Writers' Workshop, and has held an appointment at Harvard University since 1999. Graham replaced Nobel Laureate and poet Seamus Heaney as Boylston professor in Harvard's Department of English and American Literature and Language. She became the first woman to be awarded this position.

== Personal life ==
Graham was married to and divorced from publishing heir William Graham, brother of Donald E. Graham, the former publisher of The Washington Post. She then married the poet James Galvin in 1983 and they divorced in 1999. She married poet and painter Peter M. Sacks, in 2000.

== Poetry competition controversy ==
In January 1999, she judged the University of Georgia Contemporary Poetry series contest, which selected the manuscript "O Wheel" from Peter M. Sacks, her future husband, as the first-place winner. Graham noted that at that time she was not married to Sacks, and that while she had "felt awkward" about giving the award to her then-boyfriend, she had first cleared it with the series editor, Bin Ramke. As a result of the critical media coverage Ramke resigned from the editorship of the series. Graham subsequently announced that she would no longer serve as a judge in contests although she continued to do so after 2008. Throughout the course of the contest, Ramke had insisted that judges of the contest be kept secret, and until Foetry.com obtained the names of judges via The Open Records Act, the conflict of interest had been undisclosed. A statement now adopted in the rules of many competitions (including the University of Georgia Contest) to prevent judges from selecting students is often referred to as the "Jorie Graham rule".

The Foetry site also contended that Graham, as a judge at Georgia and other contests, had awarded prizes to at least five of her former students from the Iowa Writers' Workshop, including Joshua Clover, Mark Levine, and Geoffrey Nutter. Graham's reply to this was that over years of teaching she has had over 1400 students, many of whom went on to continue writing poetry, that no rules had prohibited her from awarding prizes to former students, and that in each case she claims to have selected the strongest work.

== Awards ==
Year	Title	Award	Category	Result	Ref.
1985	—	Whiting Award	Poetry	Won	
1991	Region of Unlikeness	Los Angeles Times Book Prize	Poetry	Finalist	
1994	Materialism: Poems	Los Angeles Times Book Prize	Poetry	Finalist	
1996	The Dream of the Unified Field: Selected Poems 1974–1994	Los Angeles Times Book Prize	Poetry	Finalist	
1996	The Dream of the Unified Field: Selected Poems 1974–1994	Pulitzer Prize	Poetry	Won	
2008	Sea Change: Poems	Los Angeles Times Book Prize	Poetry	Finalist	
2012	P L A C E	Forward Prizes for Poetry	Collection	Won	
2012	P L A C E	T. S. Eliot Prize	—	Finalist	
2012	—	Neustadt International Prize for Literature	—	Finalist	
2015	From the New World: Poems 1976–2014	Los Angeles Times Book Prize	Poetry	Won	
2017	—	Wallace Stevens Award	—	Won	
2024	To 2040	Pulitzer Prize	Poetry	Finalist	
2024	To 2040	Griffin Poetry Prize	—	Finalist	

== Publications ==
=== Poetry ===
Collections

- Hybrids of Plants and of Ghosts. Princeton University Press. 1980. ISBN 9780691013350.
- Erosion. Princeton University Press. 1983. ISBN 9780691014050.
- The End of Beauty. Ecco Press. 1987. ISBN 9780880011303.
- Region of Unlikeness. Ecco Press. 1991. ISBN 9780880012904.
- Materialism. Ecco. 1993. ISBN 9780880016179.
- The Dream of the Unified Field: Selected Poems 1974–1994. HarperCollins. 1995. ISBN 9780880014762.
- The Errancy. Ecco Press. 1997. ISBN 9780880015288.
- Photographs and Poems. Photographs Jeannette Montgomery Barron. Scalo. 1998.
- Swarm. HarperCollins. 2000. ISBN 9780060935092.
- Never. HarperCollins. 2002. ISBN 9780060084721.
- Overlord. HarperCollins. 2005. ISBN 9780060758110.
- Sea Change. HarperCollins. 2008. ISBN 9780061537189.
- P L A C E. Ecco Press. 2012. ISBN 9780062190642
- From the New World: Poems 1976–2014. Ecco Press. 2015. ISBN 9780062315403
- Fast. Ecco Press. 2017. ISBN 9780062663481.
- Runaway. Ecco Press. 2020. ISBN 9780063036703.
- [To] The Last [Be] Human. Copper Canyon. 2022. ISBN 9781556596605.
- To 2040. Copper Canyon. 2023. ISBN 9781556596773.
- Killing Spree. Farrar, Straus and Giroux. 2026. ISBN 978-0-374-61802-5.

Anthologies (edited)

- Graham, Jorie & David Lehman, eds. (1990). The Best American Poetry 1990. Collier Books.
- Graham, Jorie, ed. (1996). Earth Took of Earth: 100 Great Poems of the English Language. Ecco Press.

List of poems

Title	Year	First published	Reprinted/collected
Futures	2007	Graham, Jorie (July 5, 2007). "Futures". London Review of Books.	
I catch sight of the now	2021	Graham, Jorie (January 4–11, 2021). "I catch sight of the now". The New Yorker. 96 (43): 36–37.	
I	2021	Graham, Jorie (September 27, 2021). "I". The New Yorker. 97 (30): 76–77.	

=== Essays and other contributions ===
- Contributor to A New Divan: A Lyrical Dialogue Between East and West (Gingko Library, 2019). ISBN 9781909942288

=== Critical studies and reviews of Graham's work ===
- Helen Vendler. The Breaking of Style: Hopkins, Heaney, Graham (1995)
- Thomas Gardner, Regions of Unlikeness: Explaining Contemporary Poetry (1999)
- Daniel McGuiness, "Jorie Graham in Stitches" and "The Long Line in Jorie Graham and Charles Wright," in Holding Patterns: Temporary Poetics in Contemporary Poetry, State University of New York Press, Albany NY (2001)
- Catherine Karaguezian, No Image There and the Gaze Remains: The Visual in the Work of Jorie Graham (2005)
- Thomas Gardner (ed.), Jorie Graham: Essays on the Poetry (2005)
- N. S. Boone, Understanding Jorie Graham (2025)
