= Peter M. Sacks =

South African painter (born 1950)

Peter Sacks
- Sacks at the Politics and Prose bookstore in Washington, D.C. (2026)
- Born: 1950 (age 75–76); Port Elizabeth, Union of South Africa
- Education: University of Natal; Princeton University (BA); University of Oxford(M.Phil); Yale University(PhD)
- Known for: Painting, Poetry
- Spouses: Barbara Kassel (m. 1980, divorced) Jorie Graham (m. 2000)

Peter M. Sacks (born 1950) is an expatriate South African painter and poet living and working in the United States.

== Life ==
Sacks was born in Port Elizabeth, South Africa, and grew up in Durban, where he was educated at Clifton School (Durban) and Durban High School. His father was an obstetrician and taught at a black medical school. Sacks also studied medicine before transferring to the political science program at the University of Natal. As a student he gave speeches and organized anti-apartheid demonstrations. Sacks served a few months in the military, which was compulsory at the time, before receiving a scholarship to Princeton University. After Princeton (B.A. 1973), he attended Oxford University as a Rhodes Scholar (M.Phil. 1976), and Yale University (PhD 1980). Sacks taught English at Johns Hopkins University between 1980 and 1996, being promoted to full professor in 1989. Since 1996, he has been a professor of English and American literature and language at Harvard University.

His first wife was Barbara Kassel, a painter and teacher of painting. Sacks married Pulitzer-prize winning poet Jorie Graham in 2000.

In 1999, during a residency at Marfa, Texas, Sacks began painting over photographs using thick white acrylic. Although he had been making small scale paintings in notebooks for many years, which he had chosen to keep private, this led to an interest in working on canvas and a decision to exhibit. He now shows his work in New York and around the world.

== Art ==
Sacks' first two solo shows were in Paris, at Galerie Pièce Unique, in 2004 and 2007. The first U.S. solo show in 2009 of his finely textured paintings at Paul Rodgers/9W Gallery in New York City received a review in Artforum (November 2009) by Rosalind Krauss. Following that show, the Metropolitan Museum of Art and the Museum of Fine Arts in Boston acquired large triptychs. In 2010, the Houston Museum of Fine Arts acquired another triptych from an exhibition at the Wade Wilson Gallery. A show of "New Paintings" at Paul Rogers/9W Gallery from October 2012 to January 2013 elicited considerable critical reaction. In 2014 while represented by the Robert Miller Gallery he exhibited show of large scale works, the Aftermath Series. The show featured a catalogue by Christopher Bedford. Besides the introduction of stronger color in works focused around Mandela and Gandhi, the show also revealed a new emphasis on works on paper. In February 2015 the Ivorypress Gallery in Madrid exhibited 66 works on cardboard--"pages" of a book titled "The Kafka Series." In these, wherever typed and handwritten text appeared, it was mostly drawn from Kafka's The Trial. Many of those paintings are on cardboard taken from used and labeled FedEx boxes. Sacks was until recently represented by the Marlborough Gallery, New York. An April 2017 solo show, Peter Sacks: New Works featured his Township Series and was accompanied by a catalogue introduced by Sebastian Smee. A subsequent show, Peter Sacks: Migrations, at Marlborough Fine Art, London in 2018, featured a new body of work and an essay introduction to the catalogue by Paul Keegan. In March 2019 a show of new works titled “Repair” was exhibited at Marlborough Gallery, New York with a catalogue by Leora-Maltz Leca. Of his work, Sacks has said, "I see my paintings as a cross between cave paintings, medieval frescoes, illuminated manuscripts, and late 20th-century abstract paintings....The show is about survival. It is about what endures."

A profile in The New Yorker Magazine in April 2019, "An Artist's Archeology of the Mind" examined his practice and the new work.

He is currently represented by Sperone Westwater Gallery in NYC.

== Poetry ==
The Library Journal, reviewing In These Mountains, said, "This first volume of poetry by a South African living in America is a quiet, understated, and complex work, ranging in subject from travel to homelessness; in feeling, from celebrations of beauty to painful recollection. Weaving together myth, memory, and history to narrate the fate of South African Bushmen, the long title poem expresses Sacks's complex feelings—sorrow, outrage, loss toward his homeland. Sacks is a visual poet – an image maker rather than an abstract or discursive one – and his images, like his feelings about South Africa, are double-edged.”

Regarding Promised Lands, J. M. Coetzee described Peter Sacks as "a poet whose sense of history lies deep in his bones." Others have praised his ability to communicate passion, pain, and the desire for redress, side by side with submission to the fact of mortality.

Natal Command chronicles the poet's despair as he watches his father die and his fatherland change. The figure of the poet as swimmer and runner, of sensual man as natural athlete, is central to the book.

O Wheel is a millennial collection of poems – some of them masquerading as diary notes – celebrating the beauty of the American West and the poet's love of his African home. The work also looks back at a century of unprecedented violence and the wrenching death of his father. In "Two Mountains," the poet, recognising himself as Isaac at the place of sacrifice, becomes the invoked Muse. Powell's Books described O Wheel as "a book of amazing delicacy, intricacy, and formal beauty that reveals terrifying truths. Its backdrop is an edgy mix of the intense violence of South Africa's recent history, the personal struggles of the human soul for the rights to speak freely and to experience justice, and the expanse of the American literary landscape. Peter Sacks employs a variety of poetic styles and approaches that break new ground formally as well as thematically. With a vision that is at once personal and public, he contends with nihilism and extracts hope from even the most barbaric aspects of human nature. O Wheel offers sensitive and striking poems that menace, overwhelm, entice, provoke, and deeply move the reader."

Sacks' relationship with Jorie Graham was briefly the subject of controversy in the poetry community when the website Foetry.com revealed that she judged the University of Georgia Contemporary Poetry series contest that selected Sacks's "O Wheel" as the first-place winner. Although contest administrator Bin Ramke refused to name the judge who had selected Sacks's poems, the allegation was shown to be correct when documents were released following a Georgia Open Records Act request. Although (according to the Los Angeles Times) Graham had not yet arrived at Harvard or married Sacks when the prize was awarded, she did not deny that she and Sacks knew each other at the time of the contest, and said that she felt awkward enough about it to ask series editor Ramke to make the call.

About his 2003 book Necessity Sacks said, "The poems make and record an unavoidable but potentially self-clarifying quest in the face of injustice, atrocity, beauty."

== Books and awards ==
Peter Sacks has published five books of poetry: In These Mountains (Macmillan 1986), Promised Lands (Penguin Books 1990), Natal Command (University of Chicago 1997), O Wheel (University of Georgia 2000), and Necessity (W.W. Norton 2002). Individual poems by Sacks have appeared in The New Yorker, The New Republic, Boulevard, The Paris Review, and other publications. He is also the author of The English Elegy: Studies in the Genre from Spencer to Yeats (Johns Hopkins University 1985) and an art historical study, Woody Gwynn: An Approach to the Landscape (Texas Tech University 1993).

He received Phi Beta Kappa's Christian Gauss Award for The English Elegy in 1985, received a Guggenheim Fellowship in 1997, and was the 1999 winner of the University of Georgia Contemporary Poetry Series contest. In 1999 he was a Lannan Foundation writer in residence in Marfa, Texas.
