= The Harvard Undergraduate Drummers =

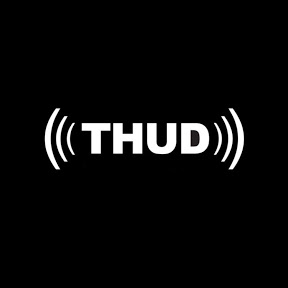
- THUD's logo

Background information
- Origin: Cambridge, Massachusetts
- Genres: Mallet percussion; Found objects music; Physical theater
- Years active: 1999–present
- Website: harvardthud.com

YouTube information
- Channel: HarvardUndergradDrummers
- Years active: 2009–present
- Subscribers: 364 thousand
- Views: 86.6 million
- Last updated: August 1st, 2026

THUD (or The Harvard Undergraduate Drummers) is an undergraduate student-led music group from Harvard University in Cambridge, Massachusetts. Founded in 1999, the group performs with a diverse set of percussive instruments in the style of mixed percussion groups such as STOMP and the Blue Man Group. In addition to traditional and ethnic percussion instruments, the group is known for making creative use out of everyday items, such as brooms and plastic SOLO cups. As of 2020, they are best known for their performances using boomwhackers—hollow, plastic tubes that can be struck on any surface to create a pitched tone.

The group gained exposure for their performances on YouTube as early as 2009, but THUD wouldn't gain significant prominence outside of Harvard until late 2018, when videos of the group's performances with boomwhackers went viral. In this time, the number of their subscribers quadrupled in two months. As of June 2021, the group has 360,000 subscribers and 69,000,000 views.

The group writes their own arrangements of songs especially for their particular instrumentation. Their repertoire (and the content of their video performances) includes covers of popular songs, such as Toto's "Africa" and "Don't Stop Believin'," as well as internet meme-related songs, such as Darude - "Sandstorm" and "All Star" by Smash Mouth.
