= In a Warm Land =

1890 painting by Nikolai Yaroshenko

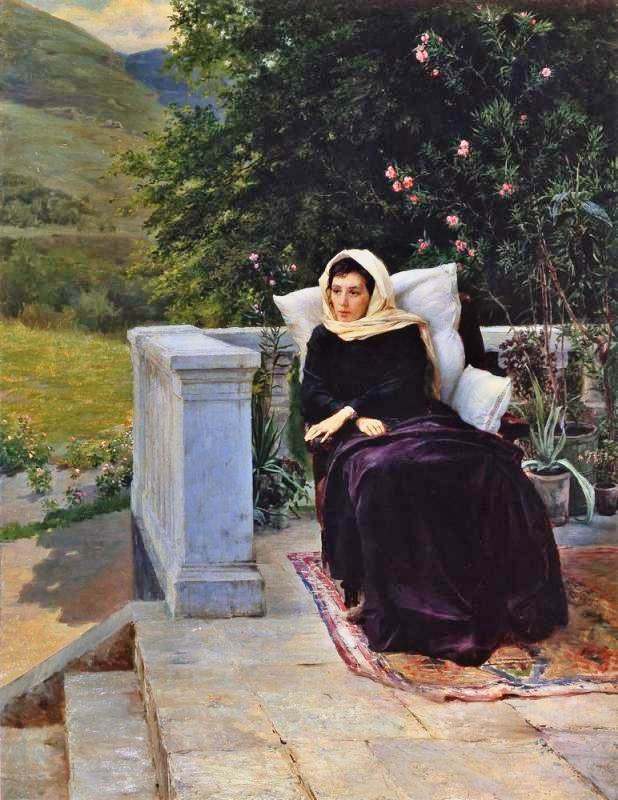
- Artist: Nikolai Yaroshenko
- Year: 1890
- Medium: Oil on canvas
- Dimensions: 107 cm × 81 cm (42 in × 32 in)
- Location: Russian Museum, Saint Petersburg

In a Warm Land (107 × 81 cm) is a painting by Russian artist, part of the Peredvizhniki's movement, Nikolai Yaroshenko, created in 1890 in Kislovodsk. The canvas forms part of the collection and permanent exhibition of the State Russian Museum in St. Petersburg. The canvas was donated to the museum by the artist's wife shortly after his death in 1898.

The painting depicts Anna Konstantinovna Chertkova, a children's writer and publicist, wife of the publisher and public figure Vladimir Grigoryevich Chertkov, a close friend of Leo Tolstoy. At the time of the painting's creation, Yaroshenko was suffering from a severe form of tuberculosis of the throat. He later wrote in a letter to Anna Chertkova: "A month and a half was almost immobile and not fit for anything body, could only lie or sit in an armchair, in the cushions ... like you in the picture that I wrote of you". A year before the painting was created, Anna Chertkova experienced a severe shock, as a result of the illness, which lasted only two days, her beloved two-year-old daughter died. For many years after that she experienced a decline in vitality and was often ill. Photographs of the Chertkov couple's staying with the artist, as well as sketches of Nikolai Yaroshenko, painter Mikhail Nesterov and Vladimir Chertkov on the process of the painting's creation have been preserved.

Contemporaries immediately "recognized and appreciated" the painting "In a Warm Land". It has repeatedly attracted the attention of researchers of Nikolai Yaroshenko's work, cultural researchers, historians and local historians both in the Soviet period and in post-Soviet Russia.

== The image in the painting ==
The painting depicts part of the veranda, house and yard of the artist's White Villa in Kislovodsk. The background is Sosnovka Mountain. The publicist and art critic Mikhail Nevedomsky described the image of the heroine in the painting as follows: "an intelligent sick lady, spending her last spring among the greenery and flowers of the fertile south: all wrapped up, she sits in an armchair on the terrace of a Crimean villa". (Note: Kislovodsk is not part of Crimea: Michael Nevedomsky's mistake.) In another of his articles, he even wrote about the painting: "a young sick woman who came to die under the southern sun by the sea, among roses and plane trees". This idea was developed by Alla Vereshchagina, a doctor of art history. She saw in the painting a pale, sad and sickly woman, "lonely longing... among the blooming beauty of southern nature". Vladimir Seklutsky, the founder and first director of the N. A. Yaroshenko Memorial Estate Museum, suggested that the woman is immersed in memories: she is half lying between the cushions with a plaid thrown over her knees, her eyes are pensive, they express the desire for life an Honored worker of culture of the Russian Federation Boris Rosenfeld wrote about them: "two black coals of expressive eyes"), and the lips as if saying the word "to live". According to Seklyutsky, the sunny landscape, full of greenery and flowers, fresh mountain air, creates an atmosphere of optimism and gives the viewer hope for the recovery of the heroine of the canvas; he regretted that art historians underestimate this painting, noting in it not only pictorial merits, but also sincere empathy of the artist with his character, a burning desire to help her.

== History of painting's creation ==
Nikolai Yaroshenko's rapid rise in the civil service came to a halt in the mid-1880s. For many years he was a "colonel with seniority", was listed in the Guards Foot Artillery, was the head of the workshop at the St. Petersburg Cartridge Factory, performed "special tasks" there. He experienced health problems (it was in 1890 he had a sharp exacerbation of tuberculosis of the throat), often took many months of vacation (sometimes without saving "for the time of it" salary from the Treasury). (Note: The artist's wife claimed in the materials "To the biography of N. A. Yaroshenko" that the chief offered the artist to submit a petition for resignation on the grounds of illness, which provided a full pension, but Yaroshenko rejected this proposal, stating that he was leaving because of the desire to freely engage in painting.) The artist actively participated in the activities of the Society of Travelling Art Exhibitions, was regularly re-elected to its board, was involved in it small everyday affairs: preparing boxes for paintings, maintenance of the cash register. Frida Roginskaya, a staff member of the Research Institute for the Theory and History of Fine Arts, claimed that he "actually bore the entire burden of leading the Society". In the second half of the 1880s, fine art in Russia gradually lost its civic pathos and sought to convey an emotional impression of reality. This brought to the fore the problem of professional skill and stricter criteria for its evaluation. In connection with this, within the partnership itself there were sharp disagreements between representatives of the older and younger generations, as well as between the very founders of this artistic movement. Yaroshenko tried to preserve not only the unity of the Society, but also its "viability".

=== Anna and Vladimir Chertkov in Yaroshenko's White Villa ===
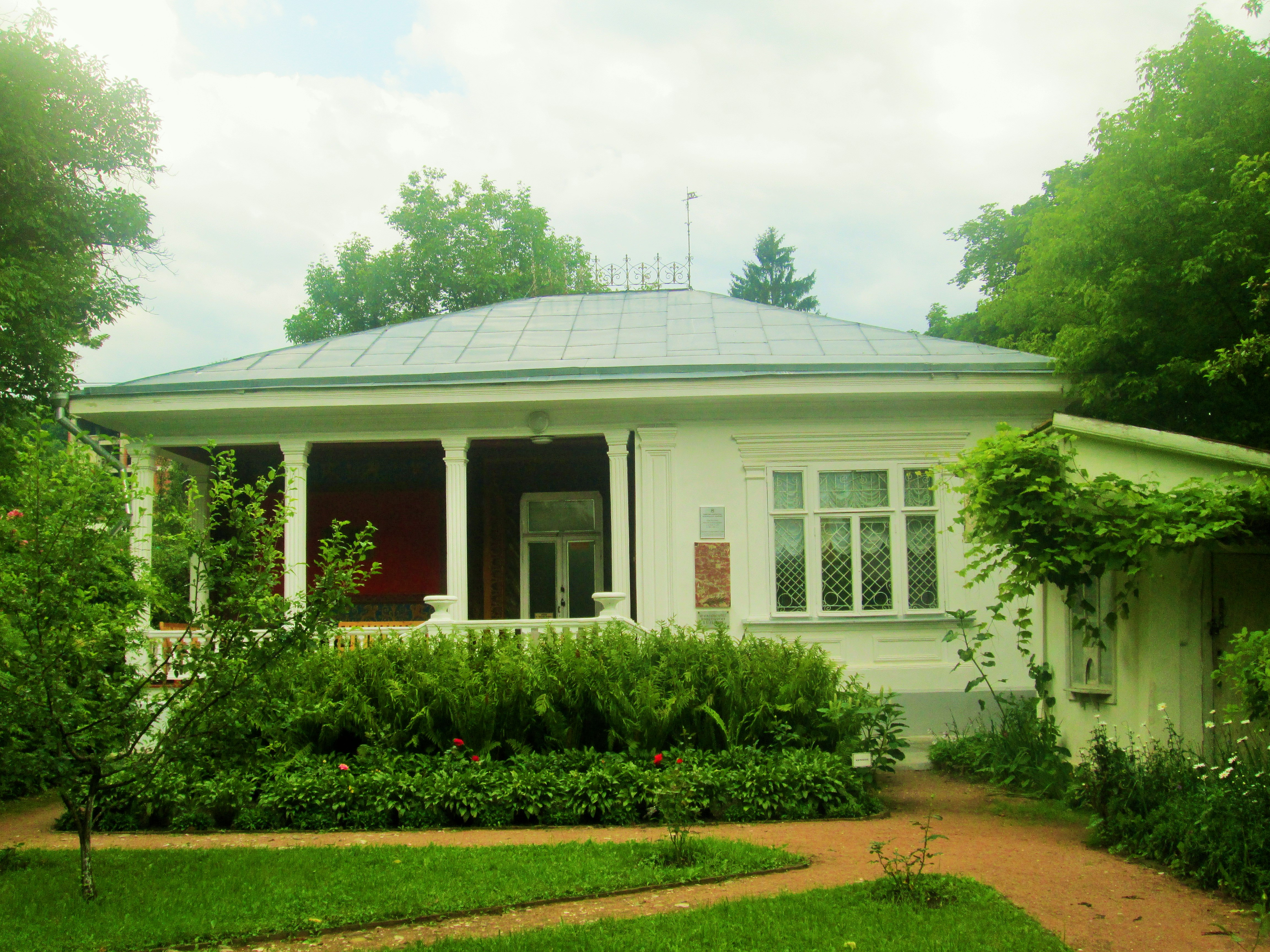
Yaroshenko's White Villa in Kislovodsk, modern photography

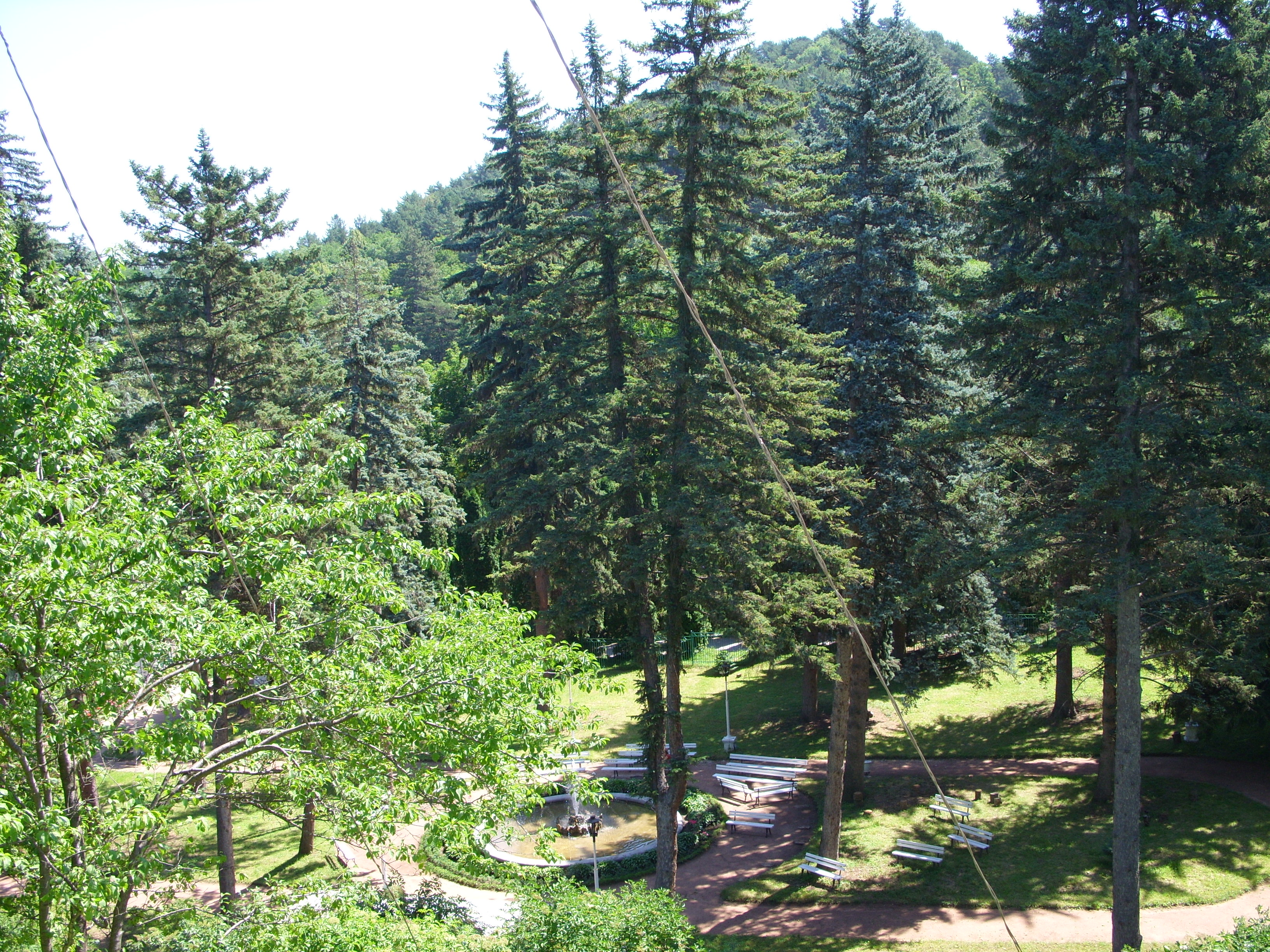

Nikolai Yaroshenko painted "In a Warm Land" in Kislovodsk at the White Villa. (Note: At present there is a memorial museum — mansion of N. A. Yaroshenko. A. Yaroshenko.) He visited Kislovodsk for the first time in 1875. In 1885, Yaroshenko's wife Maria Pavlovna bought a dacha there, but he didn't move there from St. Petersburg until 1892, after resigning from the civil service due to a sharp deterioration in his health. The house in which the artist lived and then settled in Kislovodsk was built on an elevated site, with a view of the Cathedral Square on one side and an orchard on the other. The terrace was painted by the artist himself in the "Pompeian style", where the family usually ate lunch, drank tea and spent much of their free time in the summer. From the terrace there was a beautiful view of the Sosnovka mountain. It was here that the picture "In a Warm Land" was painted. In the house there were held evenings for the friends of the Yaroshenko family, on the terrace artists, singers and musicians demonstrated their art to the guests, the wedding of the daughter of the artist Mikhail Nesterov, Olga, took place there. One of the small rooms of the house, which had a wide window, the artist equipped as a workshop.

In the summer of 1890, Vladimir Chertkov, the publisher and opposition figure, supporter and friend of Leo Tolstoy, and his wife Anna, who in 1883 had become the prototype of the painting "Student", arrived in the city. The artist exploited their stay. The Chertkovs' young son Vladimir (in the family he was called Dima) served as a model for the painting "A Sleeping Child" (1890, was in the Poltava Art Museum, died during the Great Patriotic War), (Note: Some details about the painting were given by N. V. Zaitseva in her article. She claimed that the painting was called "Sleeping Child in a Pram", that a preparatory pencil drawing for the painting had been preserved, on which an unidentified person had written "Does not remember". On the basis of handwriting comparison, Zaitseva concluded that the inscription was written by E. F. Shershenyova. F. Shershenyova (in her maiden name – Strakhova), who as a girl entered the Chertkov family, but whom she asked about this sketch and in whose memory it was not known, Zaitseva could not establish.) and Anna posed for the canvas "In a Warm Land". A year earlier, the Chertkovs had lost a daughter, Olga (1887 – July 17, 1889). Lyusya, as she was called in the family, was a "lively and affectionate girl", a favorite of the entire Chertkov family and their many households. She died of dysentery after only two days. The girl's death was a severe blow to her mother. For many years after that, Anna Chertkova experienced a decline in vitality and was often ill. For her recovery, the family went to the south. The artist Mikhail Nesterov, who himself lived in Kislovodsk at that time, wrote that Yaroshenko allocated a whole wing to the Chertkovs' residence, which was even larger than the White Villa itself. In this villa's wing, according to him, once lived Emilia Shan-Girey (the prototype of Mikhail Lermontov's Maria). Nesterov mentions that Anna Chertkova posed for Yaroshenko, but he calls the painting itself "The Sick", not "In a Warm Land". (Note: Boris Rosefeldt, in his book on the White Villa, also writes that the painting was originally titled “sick” and only later became known as “In a Warm Land”.)

In the collection of the Memorial Museum-estate of N. A. Yaroshenko there is a photograph depicting Vladimir and Anna Chertkova, who were in the White Villa in 1890[6]. There are also preserved drawings of Anna Chertkova made by the artist in that year: "A. K. Chertkova on the balcony" (paper, Italian graphic pencil, 17,5 × 13,3 cm, in the drawing by the hand of his son Vladimir signed "A friendly sketch of Yaroshenko with my mother") and "Chertkov family friendly caricature" (paper, cardboard, graphic pencil, 20×23 cm).

The Chertkov couple in the White Villa in 1890

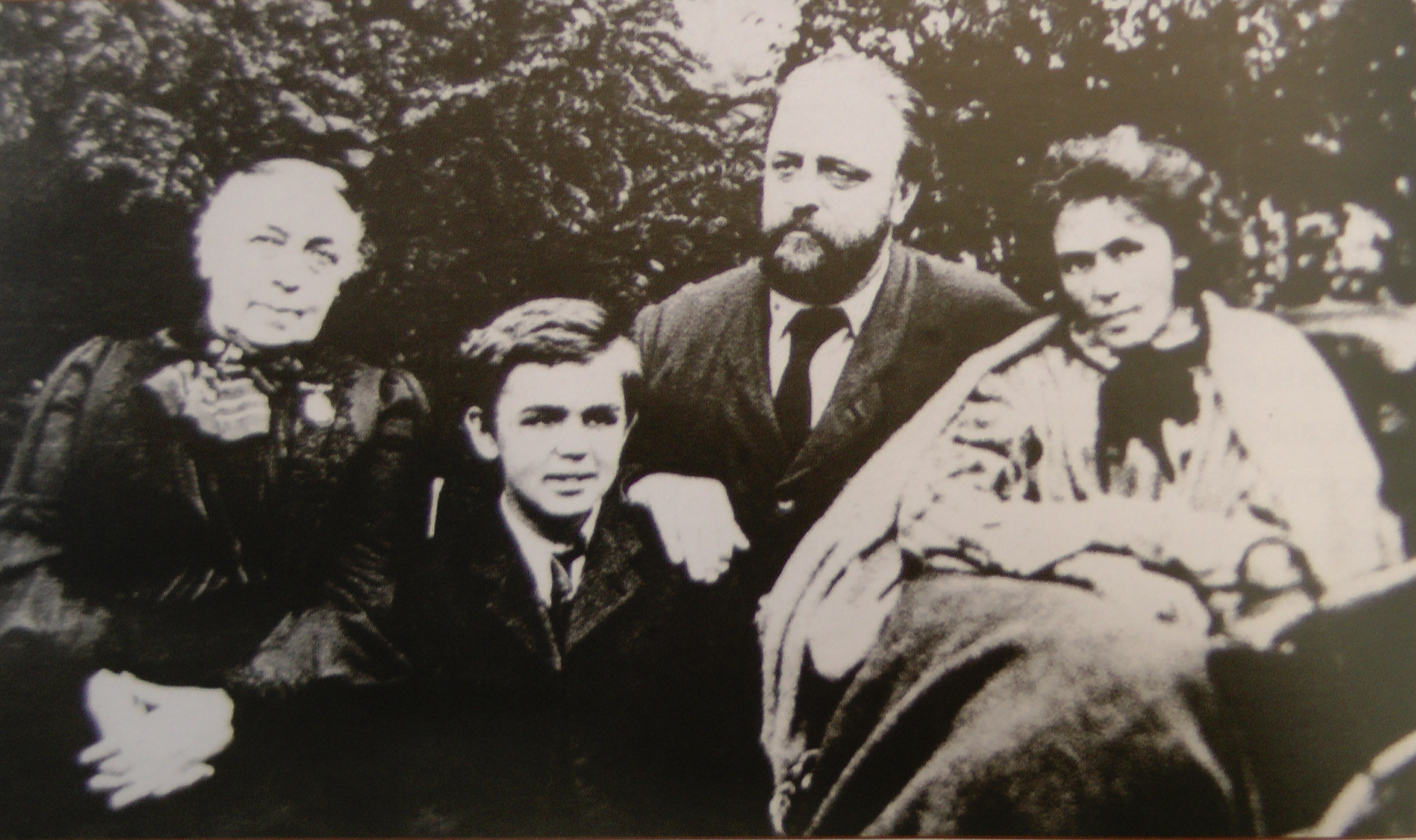
The Chertkov couple (right) at Yaroshenko's White Villa in 1890

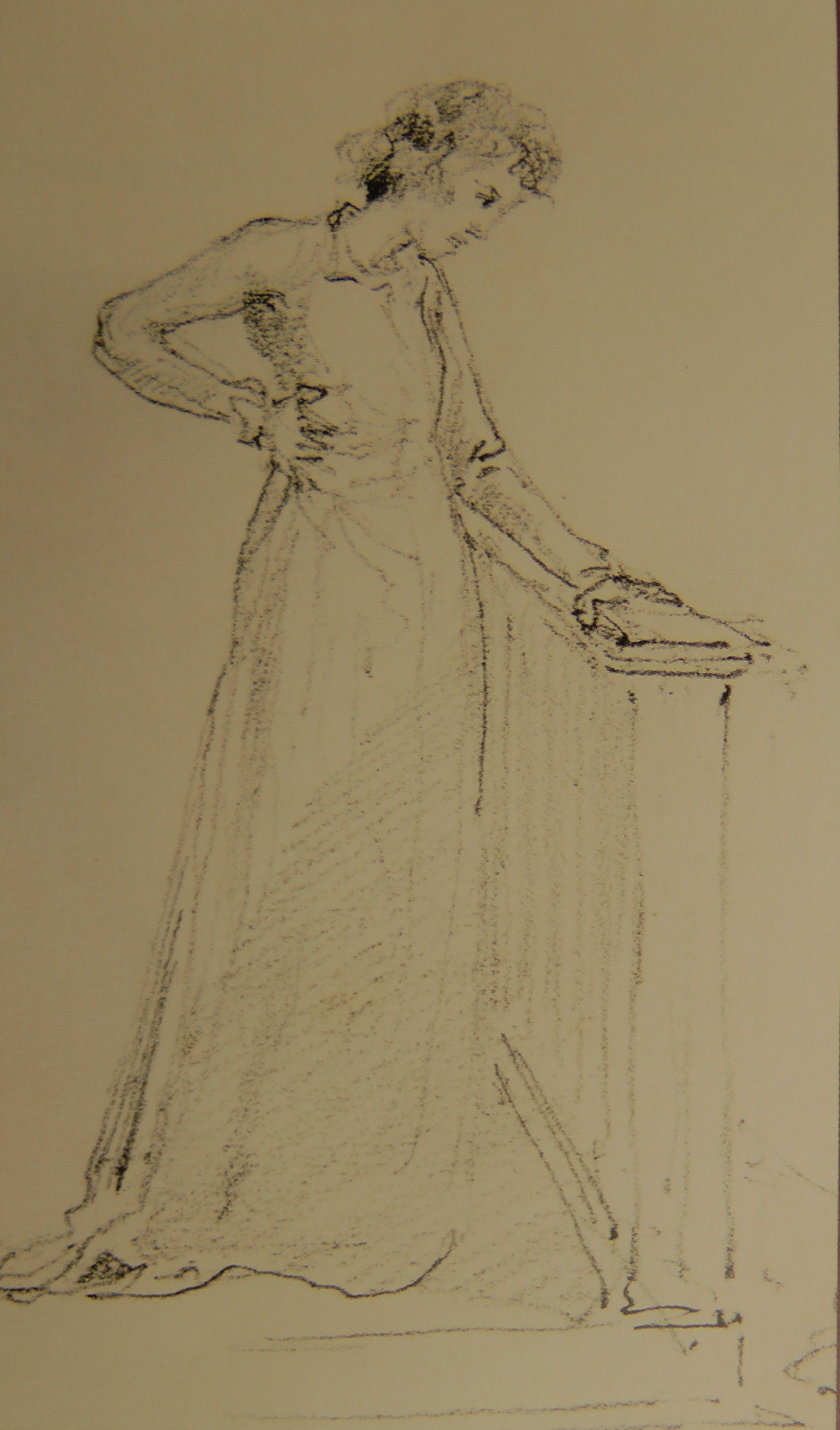
Nikolai Yaroshenko. A. K. Chertkova on the balcony, 1890

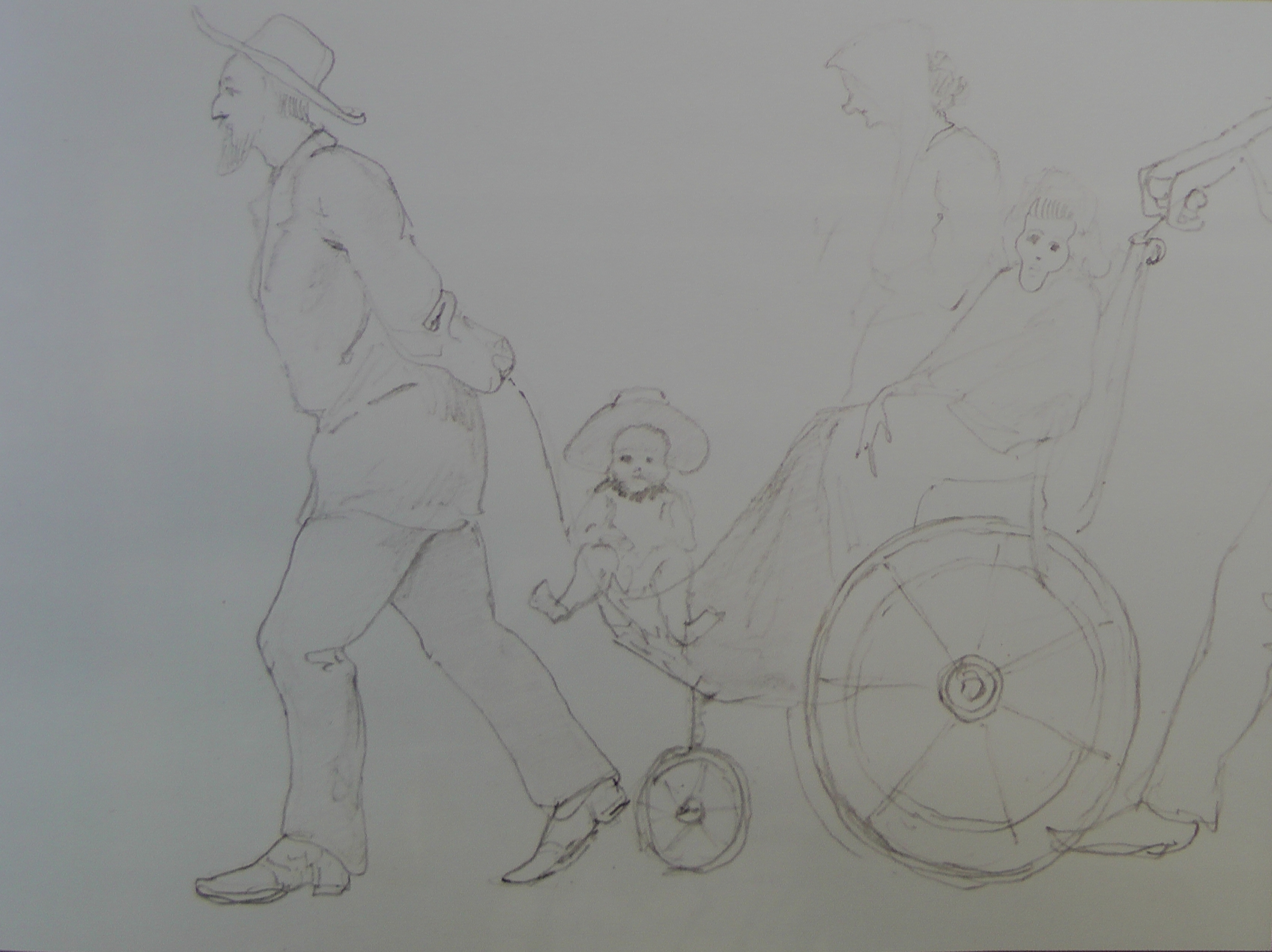
Chertkov family friendly caricature, 1890

=== Contemporaries about the painting ===
Nikolai Yaroshenko. "Seeing off", 1890

The catalog of the XIX traveling exhibition mentions four paintings presented by Nikolai Yaroshenko at once: "Portrait of N. N. Ge" (no. 78, canvas, oil, 92,5 × 73,5 cm, the canvas is currently in the Russian Museum), "In a Warm Land" (no. 79 in the catalog), "A Sleeping Child" (No. 80), "Seeing Off" (No. 81, canvas, oil, 125 × 150 cm, in the collection of the Omsk Regional Fine Arts Museum named after M. A. Vrubel). Usually in modern art history three paintings are associated with this exhibition — "Portrait of N. N. Ge", "In a Warm Land" and "Farewell". Only Irina Polenova, a senior researcher at the N. A. Yaroshenko Memorial Estate Museum, mentioned "A Sleeping Child" in connection with the exhibition in her 2018 book.

Considering that the painting "In a Warm Land" is a portrait of a sick woman, leaning on pillows, wrapped in a blanket, sadly living out her life in a chair on the terrace of a Ksilovodsk dacha, one of the contemporary reviewers joked that the hero of the second painting (it depicts a lonely old man standing on an empty platform. Under the ceiling of the station hang thick clouds of steam, dispersing after the departure of the railway platform, porter sweeps away the litter from the stone slabs, hands behind his back next to indifferent stands a policeman) in the warm lands of that suffering from consumption woman sitting in a chair on the balcony of Kovslevodskom.

Contemporaries who knew Anna Chertkova did not recognize her image in the painting "Cursist", and the painting "In a Warm Land" was perceived as a traditional portrait (although, according to the cultural historian and author of a biography of the artist published in Soviet times, Vladimir Porudominsky, it has a more complex plot). Ilya Repin wrote to Chertkov: "Here at the exhibition, the picture of Anna Konstantinovna (by Yaroshenko) convalescing very much to my liking. Expressive and subtle. A beautiful thing". Leo Tolstoy, after seeing the canvas "In a Warm Land" at Yaroshenko's posthumous exhibition, called it "Galya in Kislovodsk" (Galya called Chertkova close to her people). Visitors of the traveling exhibition pitied the beautiful lady who, in their opinion, was destined to leave the earthly world. Porudominsky noted that the suffering in this painting, which, in his opinion, lacks "inner content", "iron" and "phosphorus", does not arouse empathy, but pity. According to him, this is why reproductions of the painting "In a Warm Land" were printed before the revolution in magazines intended for ordinary people.

Boris Rosenfeld in his book about the artist's memorial museum-estate wrote that contemporary critics "recognized and highly appreciated" the painting "In a Warm Land" and considered it "one of the best paintings made in Kislovodsk".

== The painting "In a Warm Land" in the collection of the Russian Museum ==
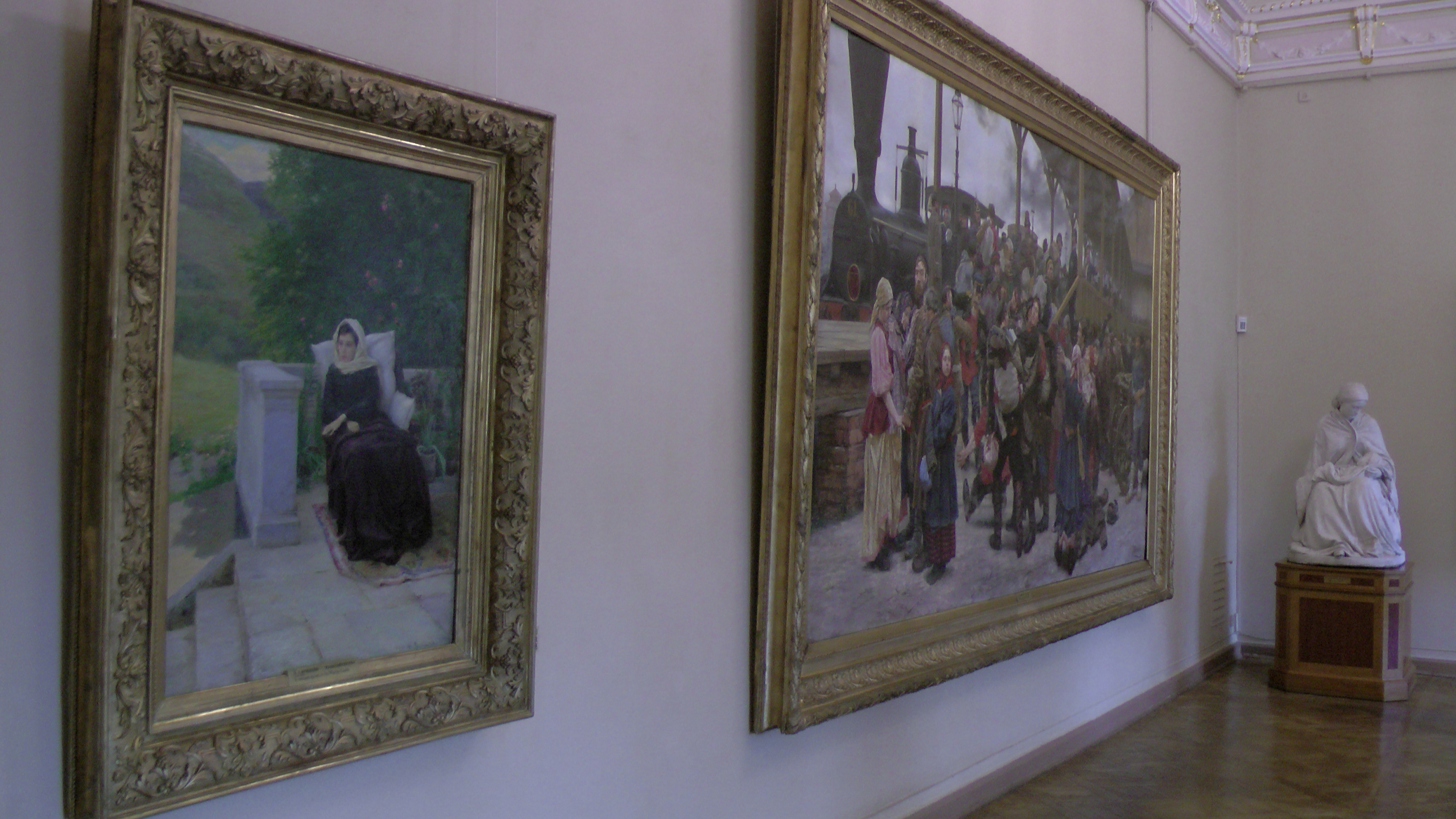
The painting "In a Warm Land" in the permanent exposition of the Russian Museum, 2020

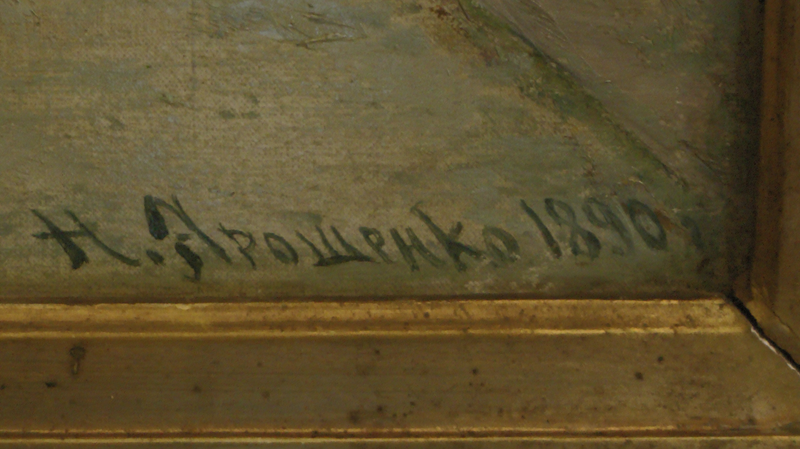
Signature of Nikolai Yaroshenko

In 1898, after the death of her husband, the artist's wife transferred to the newly established Russian Museum of Emperor Alexander III some of her husband's works in her collection, including this painting. The painting "In a Warm Land" is in the collection of the Russian Museum (inv. - Zh-2500), and its other version is in the collection of the Yekaterinburg Museum of Fine Arts, where it was given by the playwright and collector Valery Tan, its last private owner. The painting "In a Warm Land" is in the permanent exposition of the Russian Museum. The technique is oil painting on canvas. Its size is 107 (or 107.5)×81 cm. The painting is signed and dated by the author in the lower right corner: "N. Yaroshenko. 1890". The painting was shown at various exhibitions. Among them: XIX Mobile Art Exhibition (1891), at the group posthumous exhibition of three artists — Ivan Yendogurov, Ivan Shishkin, Nikolai Yaroshenko in 1899 and at the exhibition of Yaroshenko's works in Moscow in the same year 1899.

In the National Museum "Kyiv Art Gallery" there is an album of the artist from the late 80's – early 90's (cover: 25,×33,7 cm, 27 sheets, the size of each of them: 24×33 cm, 22 of them are filled with pencil drawings, the rest are empty). Sheet 12 of this album is a sketch for the painting "In a Warm Land". At the top left is the inscription "N. Y. Vyrob...". On the back of the page is a portrait of a man wearing a hat. This sketch was exhibited at the exhibition of Nikolai Yaroshenko's works in Kyiv in 1948. Another sketch for the painting, not mentioned by the candidate of art history Vladimir Prytkov in his monograph on the works of Yaroshenko, is in the State Museum of Leo Tolstoy (paper, pencil, 33×23 cm, AIG-858 / 21, in the collection it bears the name "Sketch of the portrait of A. K. Chertkova", on the sketch of the portrait of A. K. Chertkova. K. Chertkova"; the sketch bears the inscription: "The wife of Vladimir Grigorievich Chertkova, Anna Konstantinovna, née Diterikhs, took part in posing for the picture"; the sketch is signed by the artist). The central part of the picture depicts a woman sitting in an armchair on a veranda, leaning on cushions. A portrait of the artist himself, taken from the shoulder and in profile, is on the back of the sheet.

The Leo Tolstoy State Museum also keeps a pencil drawing by Vladimir Chertkov (1890, paper, pencil, is in the album of drawings by Vladimir Chertkov), in which he depicted Nikolai Yaroshenko at work on the painting "In a Warm Land". The candidate of philological sciences Nadezhda Zaitseva mentioned in her article that at that time Chertkov made sketches of the painting itself, as well as of his wife.

Nikolai Yaroshenko at work

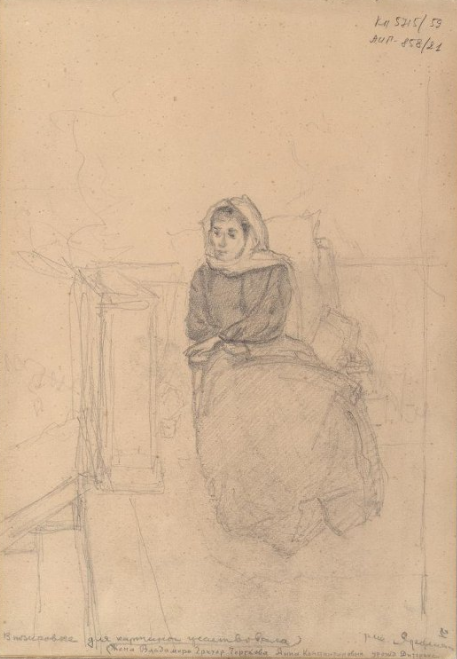
Nikolai Yaroshenko. Sketch of A. K. Chertkova's portrait, 1890s

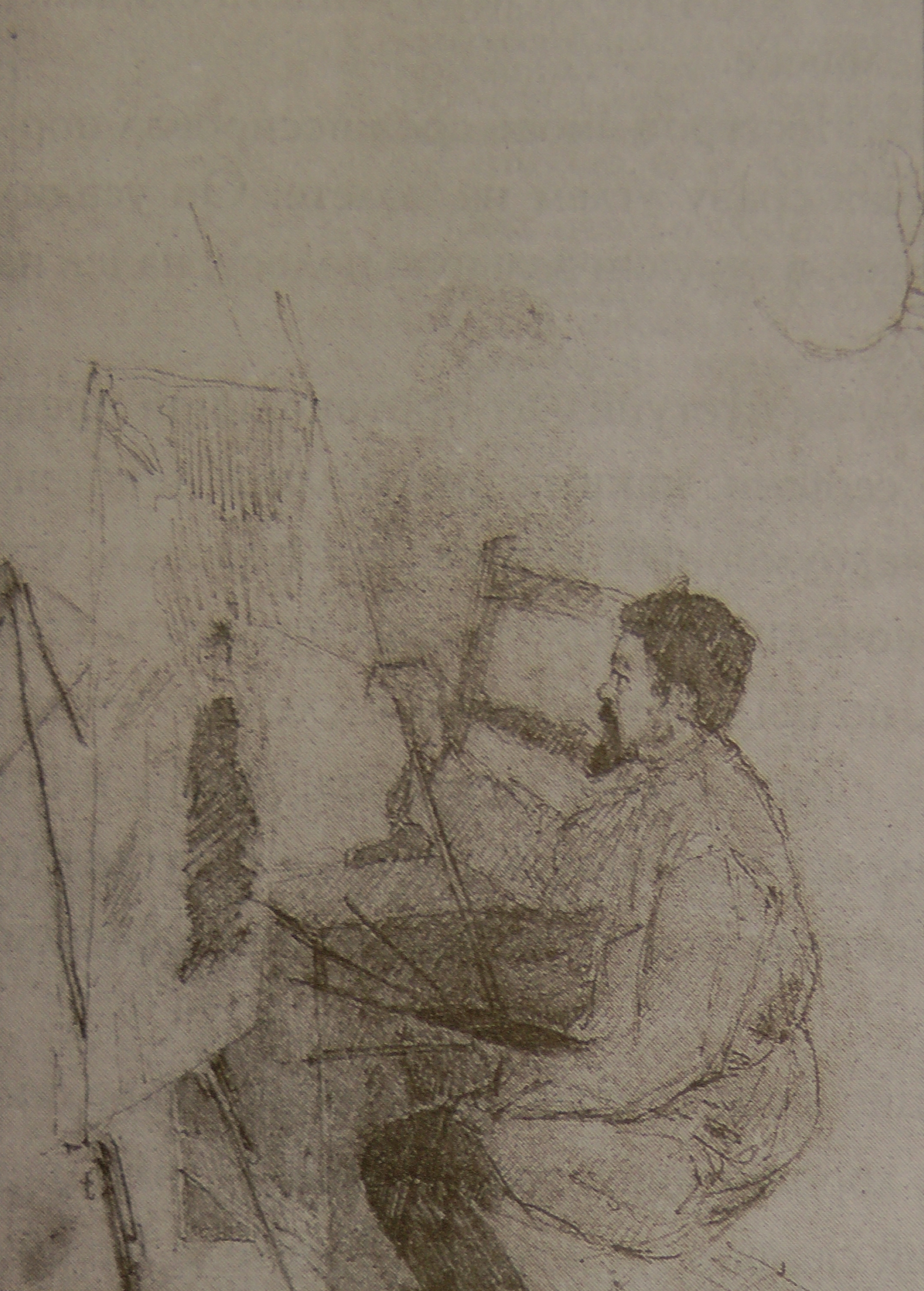
Vladimir Chertkov. Nikolai Yaroshenko at work on the painting "In a Warm Land", 1890s.

== Painting in the works of Soviet and Russian art historians and cultural researchers ==
=== The painting in the Soviet researchers' works ===
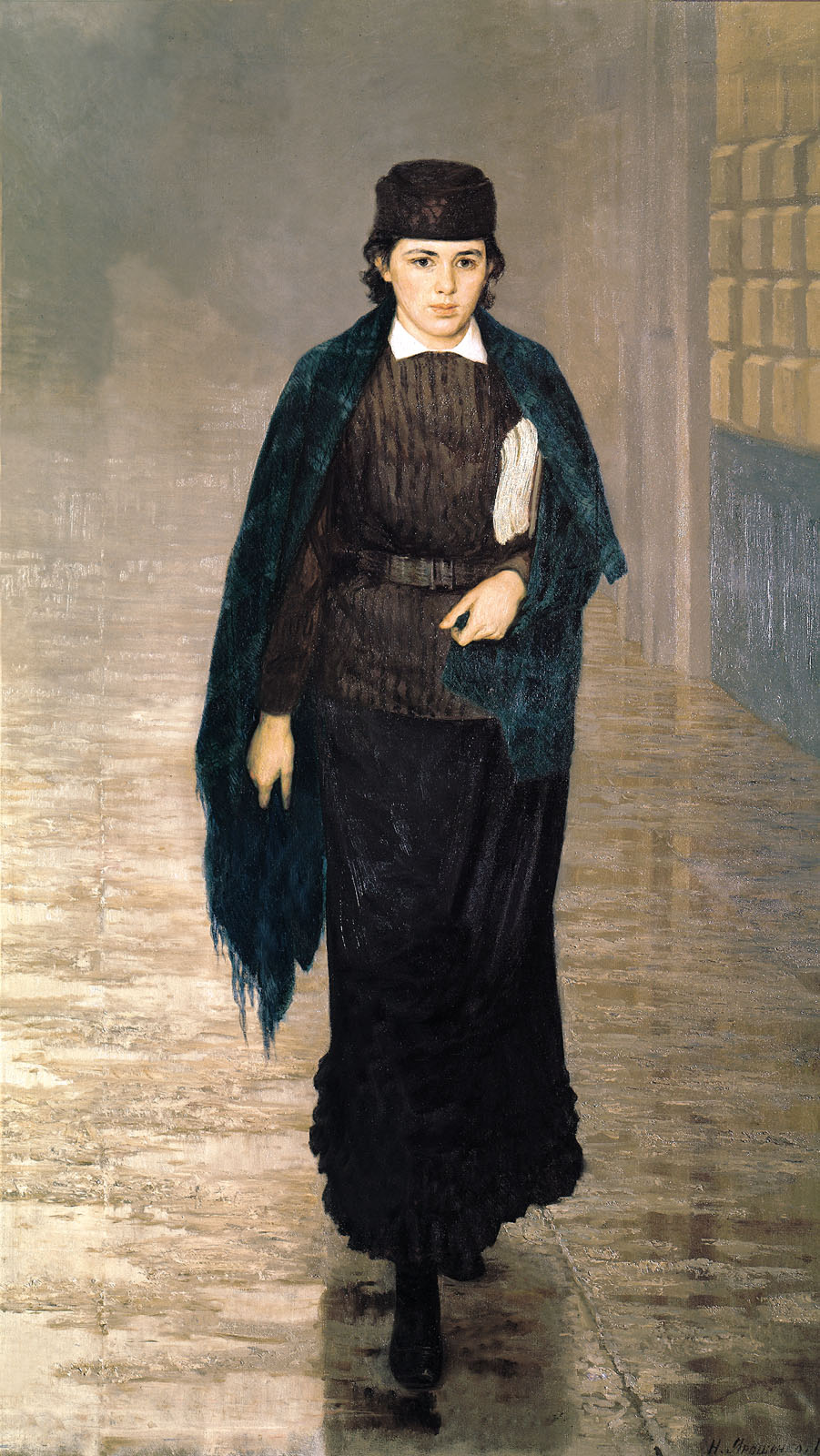
The Student Girl, 1883, N. Yaroshenko, from the Kyiv's Museum Collection.

Leo Tolstoy's last secretary Valentin Bulgakov, later author of memoirs about the writer's entourage and Soviet artists, well acquainted with both Anna Chertkova and Nikolai Yaroshenko, wrote in his memoirs after the World War II:

Here Anna Konstantinovna is portrayed at a mature age, after her marriage and after a serious illness: the lady, not yet old, wrapped in a plaid and shawls, is depicted sitting in an armchair on an open veranda covered with roses somewhere in the south, probably in the Crimea. The hand sticking out from under the shawl and stretching along the armchair handle is good here. Anna Konstantinovna can be recognized by this hand alone... But the face is very similar...However, the resemblance of the face was deliberately reduced by the artist after the painting was finished, at the request of Anna Konstantinovna and her relatives, because the painting was to go to a large exhibition in St. Petersburg.

Bulgakov called the painting "Recovering", not "In a Warm Land". He noted that Yaroshenko must have been attracted to "the type of spiritualized, subtle, and internally and externally chaste and attractive, chaste, modest female creature" to which, in his opinion, Chertkova belonged.

In his monograph on Yaroshenko, candidate of art history Vladimir Prytkov wrote that the artist showed great professionalism in painting. The shawl thrown over the woman's head corresponds to the color of the pillow, "bluish in the shade and yellowish in the light", "the black dress is painted over the brownish ground with free strokes of blue-violet general tone and harmonizes well with the lilac plaid". In Prytkov's opinion, the "pale, gaunt face" and the "thin, expressive ... hands" are perfectly rendered. The marble baluster and the foreground are rendered with a richness of color that conveys the subjects outdoors in sunlight. The generalized painted background is characterized by a "subtle nuance of color"; behind the balustrade, the dark green foliage includes "lush patches of roses. It is in harmony with the woman's clothing and the carpet at her feet. In the figure of the woman, in the movement of her hands, in her pale face and in the look of her black eyes, one can feel the impulse to live and, at the same time, the bitter awareness that, even after her death, "indifferent nature will shine with eternal beauty". (Note: Vladimir Prytkov used the quotation from Alexander Pushkin's poem "Walking on noisy streets", written by the poet in 1829.)

According to Vladimir Prytkov, the painting "In a Warm Land" reveals its belonging to the genre painting not through the actions of the character, but through his experiences. From the researcher's point of view, this is generally characteristic of the artist's works of the 80s and 90s. The principle of placing a single character in the foreground, which the artist used in the 80s, has been preserved. At the same time, Prytkov noted a much greater social content of "Student", painted in the previous decade with the same Anna Chertkova, in comparison with the painting "In a Warm Land". The Soviet and Russian art historian Tatiana Gorina also believed that Yaroshenko had weakened the social and moral issues, as well as artistic integrity, in the painting "In a Warm Land". In her opinion, it is dominated by abstract-humanistic content.

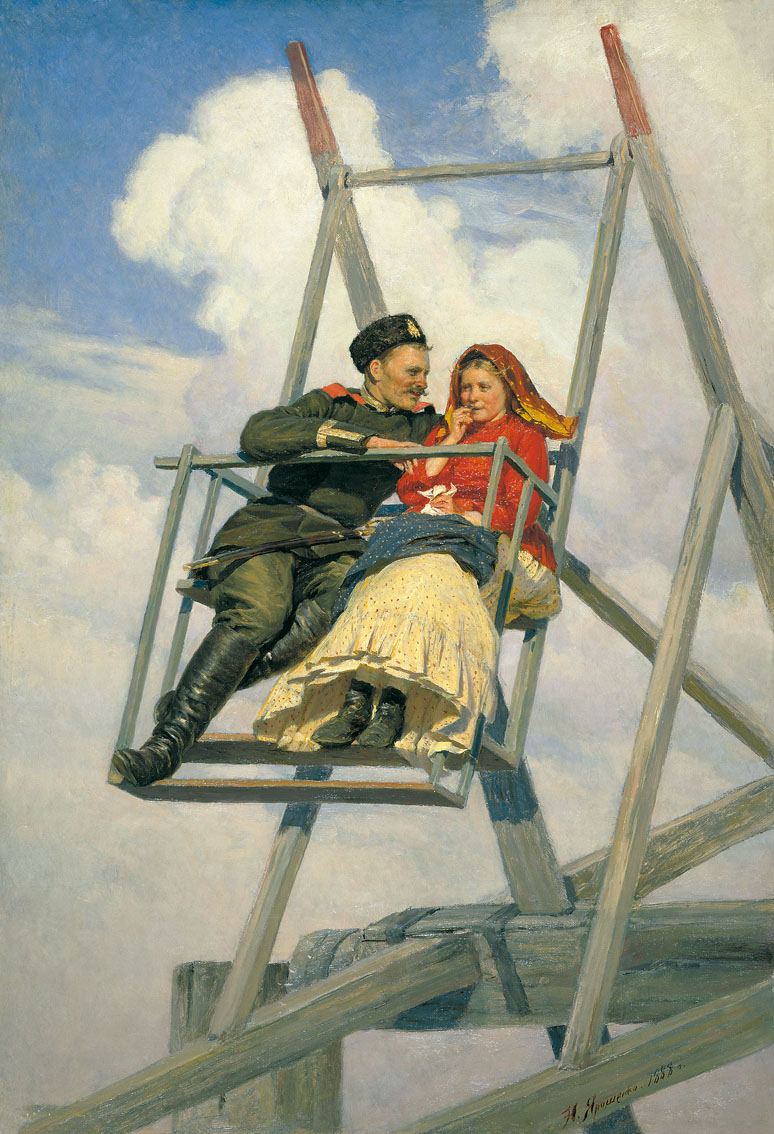
"Fragmentary Composition" on the painting "On the Swing"

Art history candidate Sophia Goldstein noted the artist's use of the principles of fragmentary composition characteristic of some of Yaroshenko's works in genre painting of the late 80s and early 90s ("On a Swing," 1888, cardboard, oil, 58.3×40.5 cm, State Russian Museum; "Dreamer", 1892, whereabouts unknown; "Choir", 1894, originally in the private collection of T. N. Pavlova in St. Petersburg, now in the Memorial Museum-estate of N. A. Yaroshenko, and others). N. Pavlova in St. Petersburg, now in the Memorial Museum-estate of N. A. Yaroshenko, and others). All of them, with the exception of the painting "In the carriage" (late 1880s, canvas, oil, 31 × 34 cm, private collection of G. P. Belyakov in Moscow, bottom right signature "N. Yaroshenko"), which is also characterized by the freshness of the pictorial solution, in her opinion, deprived of "content", which is characteristic of the best paintings of the artist 1870-1880s.

Soviet art historian Vladimir Porudominsky emphasized in the painting "In a Warm Land" sadness hopelessly ill woman, "with a special acuity feel his place in nature ...". In recent years Yaroshenko himself suffered from severe throat consumption. In a letter to Anna Chertkova he reported: "A month and a half was almost immobile and not fit for anything body, could only lie or sit in an armchair, in the cushions ... like you in the picture that I wrote of you". (Note: The letter was written by the artist on November 8, 1894 from Kislovodsk — four years after the painting "In a Warm Land" was created.) Vladimir Porudominsky wrote that the heroine of the painting "turned out to be a beautiful lady with exquisitely correct features (which expressed not so much her or the artist's suffering as the desire to make it 'touching'), with thin, graceful hands, which she holds in a somewhat ostentatious manner; the landscape is painted in muted tones, lines and colors of his soothed, pritishcheny, favorite Yaroshenko powerful, formidable images of nature gave way to a beautiful view, largely hidden around the balcony trees and shrubs, on the balcony along the white marble railing put garden plants in tubs, pleasant pink flowers pleasing to the eye". The writer and art historian Leonid Volynsky called the painting "about the sadness of fading in the midst of blooming nature".

=== Current Russian researchers on the painting ===
Irina Polenova did not see any hopelessness in the painting, although, according to her, the artist was reflecting on the transience of life. She noticed the white color of the cushions and the woman's shawl, which contrasts with the black color of her clothes. According to her, the black color only introduces a "note of mourning" into the "peaceful scene". It is the landscape that plays the main emotional and semantic role. The dim sun illuminates the green slopes of the mountains, a light shadow lies on the crowns of the trees and on the sandy path. Soft colors correspond to the freshness of the air. Polenova emphasized that there is no "despair or protest" in the look of the woman on the canvas, but only thoughtfulness and seriousness. The woman perceives herself as a part of the world around her and accepts its laws. The peace of nature depicted by the artist corresponds to the heroine's mood. Polenova believes that it is impossible to accuse the picture of lacking social content, as the artist simply did not set such a task. She argued that the artist was trying to convey an understanding of nature as uplifting and giving a meaningful beginning to human existence. Polenova noted the drama of the canvas and the attention paid to the heroine's experiences.

Historian Gregory Wolf noted a combination of sadness and beauty in the painting, emphasizing the heroine's delicate features and thin, graceful hands. According to him, the painting conveys "the elegiac mood of a man who felt with a special acuity the fragility of his existence". Elena Petinova, a student of art history, called the canvas "a small genre painting on a purely domestic theme". She noted in it a warmth and soulfulness not characteristic of the artist's earlier work.

Fragments of the painting

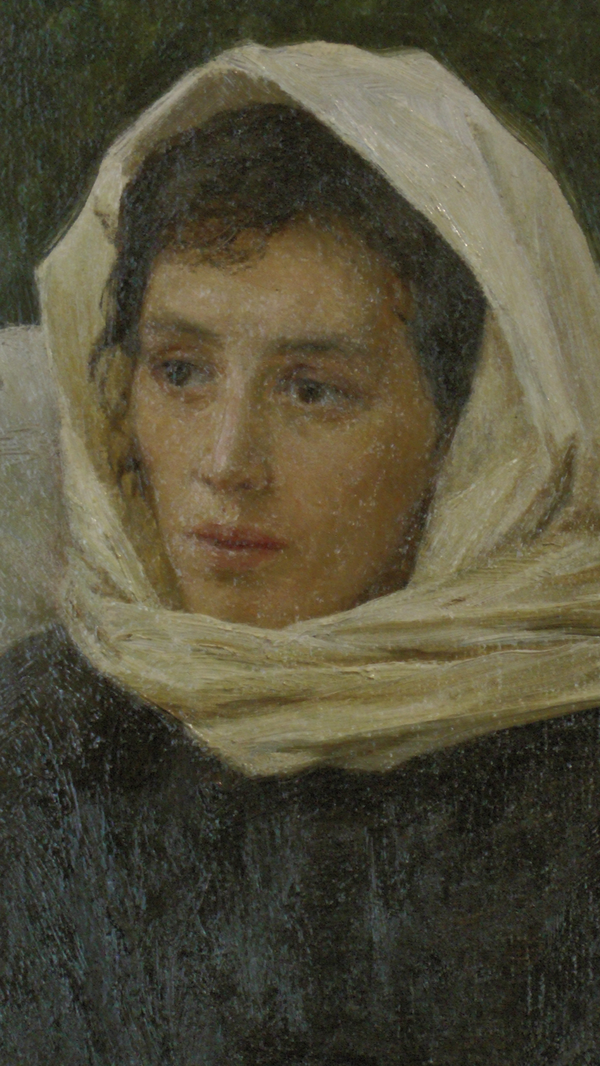
Anna Chertkova on the painting

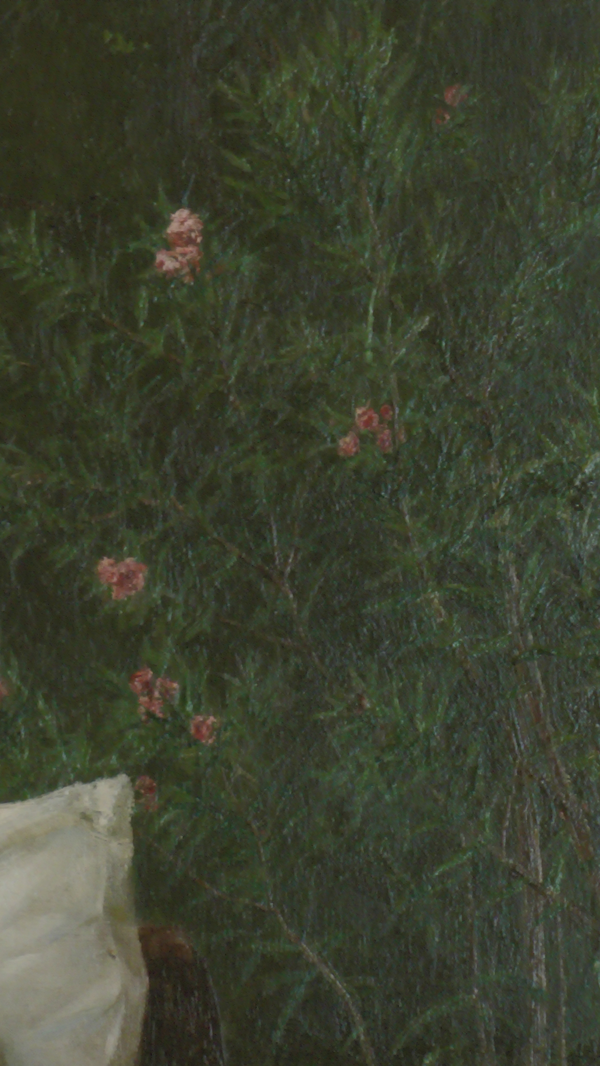
Flowers behind Chertkov's back

== Bibliography ==
=== Sources ===
- Нестеров М. Н. А. Ярошенко // Давние дни. Встречи и воспоминания. — М.: Искусство, 1959. — P. 53—80. — 399 p. — 15 000 copies.
- Товарищество передвижных художественных выставок. Письма, документы. 1869–1899 / В. В. Андреева, М. В. Астафьева, С. Н. Гольдштейн, Н. Л. Приймак. — М.: Искусство, 1987. — 668 p.
- Ярошенко М. П. К биографии Н. А. Ярошенко // Николай Александрович Ярошенко. Письма. Документы. Современники о художнике. — М.: БуксМАрт, 2018. — P. 64—69. — 296 p. — ISBN 978-5-906190-92-5.
- Ярошенко Н. А. Послужной список Н. А. Ярошенко // Николай Александрович Ярошенко. Письма. Документы. Современники о художнике. — М.: БуксМАрт, 2018. — P. 60—63. — 296 p. — ISBN 978-5-906190-92-5.
- Ярошенко Н. А. Из писем // Николай Александрович Ярошенко. Письма. Документы. Современники о художнике. — М.: БуксМАрт, 2018. — P. 70—156. — 296 p. — ISBN 978-5-906190-92-5.

=== Scientific and popular sources ===
- Булгаков В. Ф. Телятинки и Ясная Поляна после смерти Л. Н. Толстого // Как прожита жизнь: Воспоминания последнего секретаря Л. Н. Толстого. — М.: Кучково Поле, 2012. — 864 p. — (Tolstoy Series (Vol. 10)). — ISBN 978-5-9950-0273-4.
- Верещагина А. Г. Николай Александрович Ярошенко. — Л.: Художник РСФСР, 1967. — 54 p. — (Народная библиотечка по искусству). — 20 000 copies.
- Верещагина А. Г. О Н. А. Ярошенко // Наследие Н.А. Ярошенко в движении эпох [Текст]: Материалы международной науч.-практич. конференции, посвящ. 45-летию основания Мемориального музея-усадьбы художника Н. А. Ярошенко и 100-летию со дня рождения В. В. Секлюцкого — основателя и первого директора (6—8 июля 2007 г., Кисловодск) / Ред. кол. Б. Р. Гочияев, Н. С. Бескровная, Т. Т. Бурлакова. — Кисловодск: Издательство КГТИ, 2008. — P. 72—76. — 199 p. — (Народная библиотечка по искусству).
- Волкова Т. Н. [Составитель]. Л. Н. Толстой и его близкие. — М.: Современник, 1986. — 373 p. — 50 000 copies.
- Волынский Л. Н. Лицо времени: Книга о русских художниках. 4-е изд.. — М.: Детская литература, 1982. — 238 p. — 50 000 copies.
- Вольф Г. В. — М.: Белый город, 2008. — 48 p. — (Мастера живописи). — 3000 copies. — ISBN 978-5-7793-1339-1.
- Воронихина Л. Н., Михайлова Т. М. Н. А. Ярошенко. Курсистка // Русская живопись XIX века: книга для чтения с комментарием. — М.: Русский язык, 1990. — V. 1. — P. 179—182. — 319 p.
- Гольдштейн С. Н. Развитие бытового жанра в 1870—1880-е годы. // История русского искусства. — М.: Наука, 1965. — V. XI. Книга I. Русское искусство II половины XIX века. — P. 300—362. — 588 p. — 12 400 copies.
- Горина Т. Н. Русское искусство // История искусства народов СССР в 9 томах. — М.: Изобразительное искусство, 1981. — V. 6. Искусство II половины XIX — начала XX века. — P. 17—191. — 455 p. — 15 000 copies.
- Государственный Русский музей. XVIII — начало XX века. Каталог. — Л.: Аврора, 1980. — 444 p.
- Зайцева Н. В. Образы В. Г. и А. К. Чертковых в творчестве М. В. Нестерова // Яснополянский сборник. — М.: Издательский дом «Ясная Поляна», 2000. — P. 159—169. — 1000 copies.
- Киевский Государственный музей русского искусства. Путеводитель. Составитель Пелькина Л.. — Киев: Мистецтво, 1955. — 152 p.
- Курсистка // Ярошенко. — Киев: ДеАгостини, 2007. — V. 150. — P. 10—11. — 100 p. — (Художественная галерея). — 100 000 copies. — ISBN 978-5-9774-0373-3.
- Муратов М. В. Л. Н. Толстой и В. Г. Чертков по их дневникам и переписке. — М.: Полиграфкнига, 1934. — 502 p. — 5300 copies.
- Неведомский М. П. Художник-интеллигент Н. А. Ярошенко // Нива : Журнал. — 1917. — 22 July (No. 29). — P. 437—442.
- Неведомский М. П. Художник-интеллигент // Николай Александрович Ярошенко. Письма. Документы. Современники о художнике. — М.: БуксМАрт, 2018. — P. 200—204. — 296 p. — ISBN 978-5-906190-92-5.
- Петинова Е. Ф. Ярошенко Николай Александрович // Русские живописцы XVIII—XIX века. Биографический словарь. Составитель Петинова Е. Ф. — СПб.: Азбука-Классика, 2008. — P. 735—738. — 767 p. — 10 000 copies.
- Поленова И. В. Классический передвижник. Летопись жизни и творчества // Николай Александрович Ярошенко. Письма. Документы. Современники о художнике. — М.: БуксМАрт, 2018. — P. 10—57, 284—286. — 296 p. — ISBN 978-5-906190-92-5.
- Поленова И. В. Ярошенко в Петербурге. — Л.: Лениздат, 1983. — 221 p. — (Выдающиеся деятели науки и культуры в Петербурге — Петрограде — Ленинграде). — 50 000 copies.
- Порудоминский В. И. В те годы дальние // Ярошенко. — М.: Искусство, 1979. — P. 54—103. — 199 p. — (Жизнь в искусстве). — 50 000 copies.
- Прытков В. А. Творчество Ярошенко 90-х годов // Николай Александрович Ярошенко. — М.: Искусство, 1960. — P. 169—175. — 54 illustrations, 320 p. — (Живопись. Скульптура. Графика). — 2500 copies.
- Рогинская Ф. С. Передвижники. — Саратов: СП «Эллис Лак», 1993. — 183 p. — 30 000 copies.
- Розенфельд Б. М. XIX. У истоков большой дружбы // Белая вилла: Мемориальный музей-усадьба Н. Ярошенко в Кисловодске. — Пятигорск: Снег, 2014. — P. 224—233. — 365 p. — 1000 copies. — ISBN 978-5-903129-60-7.
- Секлюцкий В. В. К заветной цели / Ярошенко в Кисловодске // Николай Александрович Ярошенко. — Ставрополь: Ставропольское книжное издательство, 1963. — P. 9—41, 52—56. — 29 illustrations., 120 p. — 25 000 copies.
