= Signal Production Association =

- Company type: Joint-stock company
- Founded: 1941
- Headquarters: Chelyabinsk, Russia
- Parent: NPO Pribor (Techmash)

Signal Production Association (Russian: ФГУП «Сигнал») is a company based in Chelyabinsk, Russia. It is part of NPO Pribor, a Techmash company (Rostec group).

The Signal Production Association is a manufacturer of pyrotechnics and explosives that once produced for the military but is reported to have completely suspended defense production. It is now producing fireworks, batteries, household chemicals, items for restaurants and fire-fighting equipment.

== Operation ==
In 2014 it was decided to merge the enterprise with the Kopeysky Plastics Plant with the transfer of all technological equipment to its territory. However this idea was later abandoned.

Currently the company produces a wide range of pyrotechnic products for various purposes:

- Products specially designed by order of the Maritime Register of the Russian Federation. Signal is Russia's main manufacturer of distress signaling equipment that meets the requirements of the International Convention for the Protection of Human Life at Sea SOLAS — 74/96:
  - The ULM-1 line-throwing device.
  - Light-emitting buoy BSD-97.
  - The flare of the red fire F-ZK, the white fire F-ZB.
  - Floating smoke bomb PDSH-3.
  - The ZRB-40 sound disaster missile.
  - PRB-40 Parachute Disaster Rocket (red).
  - 30mm one-star rocket of green fire ROZ-30, red fire ROCK-30.
  - The signal rocket of the chipboard of red and yellow fire.
- Products for the Armed Forces of the Russian Federation and the Ministry of Internal Affairs of Russia.
- Sports and hunting pyrotechnics: flares, all-weather matches, pyrotechnic torches, neutral smoke bombs.
- Professional pyrotechnics of various calibers. The Chelyabinsk plant produces high—rise and park fireworks, known far beyond the borders of Chelyabinsk, as well as daytime smoke fireworks, the serial production of which at the Chelyabinsk plant is the only one in Russia.
- Entertainment pyrotechnics: firecrackers, fountains, Roman candles, batteries of comets.
