= State Research Institute Kristall =

Russian chemical factory

GosNII «Kristall» OJSC
- Industry: Chemical
- Founded: 1953
- Headquarters: Dzerzhinsk, Russia
- Website: niikristall.ru

GosNII «Kristall» OJSC (Gosudarstvenny Nauchno-Issledovatel'skiy Institut «Kristall», State-Owned Scientific-Research Institute "Crystal") (AKA Factory 80) is a chemical factory in Dzerzhinsk (formerly Rastyapino), Nizhny Novgorod Oblast, Russia. It manufactures explosives and non-standard chemical equipment.

== History ==
The factory was opened in 1953 and is part of the Sverdlova factory. In 2012 "Kristall" OJSC became part of NPO Pyrotechnic Systems (Moscow region) OJSC, a subdivision of the NPK Tekhmash OJSC holding company, which is in turn part of military industrial giant Rostec. It makes industrial explosives for use in mining, military propellants and ammunition, and medicines made from chemical derivatives. It is also engaged in the research & development and testing of explosives.

=== Disasters ===
An explosion at the factory in August 2018 killed 3 people instantly, followed by 2 more who died in hospital.

Another explosion on June 1, 2019, completely destroyed the processing facility, caused a fire 100 square meters in area, and injured 38 workers and 41 residents. Fifteen people were hospitalised for wounds caused by flying shards of broken glass, but no deaths were reported. Five workers were inside the facility when the explosion occurred, but all were evacuated safely.
