= Dzerzhinsk, Russia =

Town in Nizhny Novgorod Oblast, Russia

Dzerzhinsk Дзержинск
- City
- The "House with a Spire" on Mayakovskogo Street

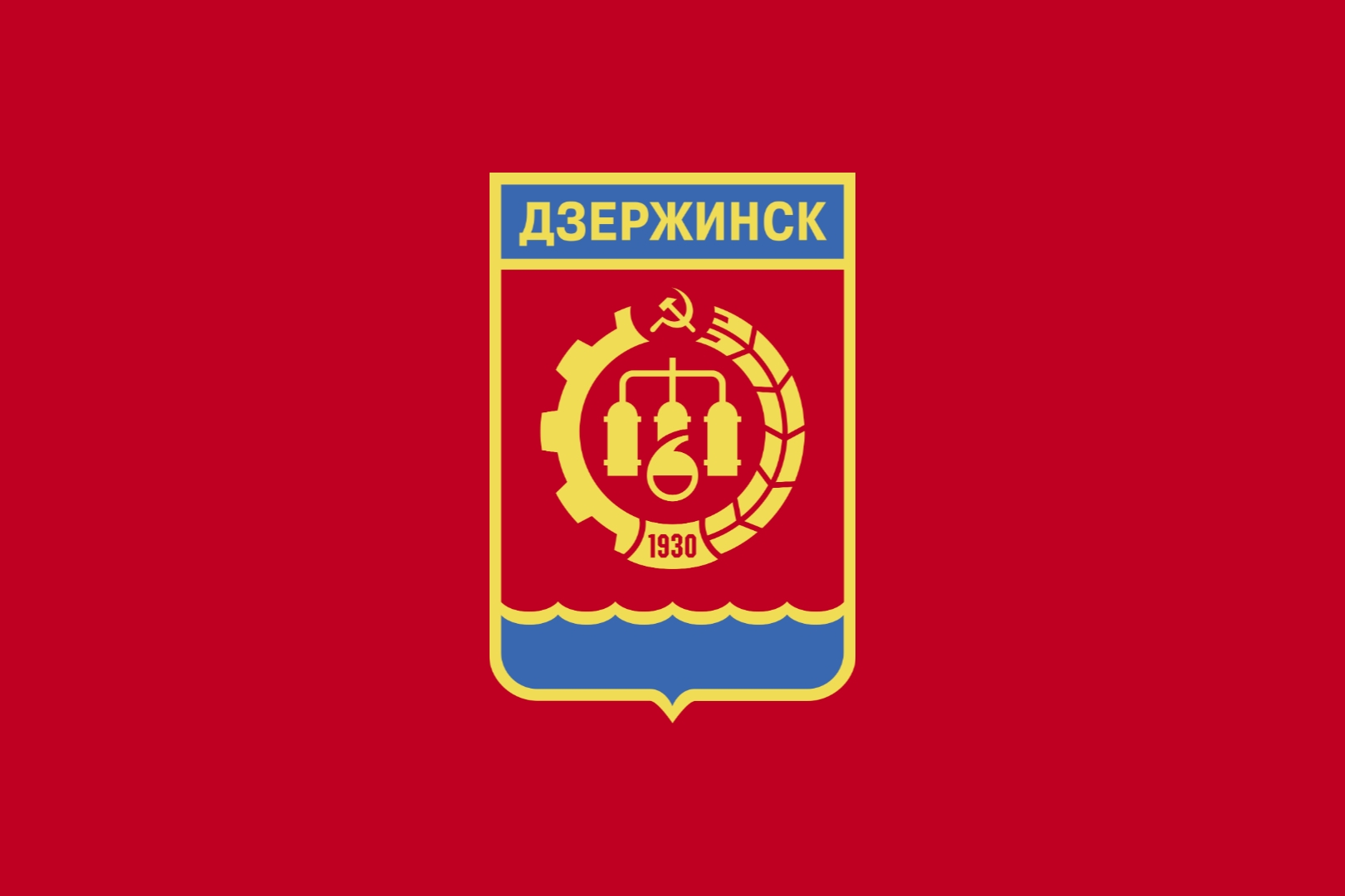
- Flag Coat of arms
- Interactive map of Dzerzhinsk
- Location of Dzerzhinsk Dzerzhinsk (Nizhny Novgorod Oblast)
- Coordinates: 56°14′N 43°27′E
- Country: Russia
- Federal subject: Nizhny Novgorod Oblast
- First mentioned: 1606

Government
  - Mayor: Mikhail Klinkov

Area
  - Total: 421 km^{2} (163 sq mi)
- Elevation: 90 m (300 ft)

Population (2010 Census)
  - Total: 240,742
  - Estimate (2025): 213,410 (−11.4%)
  - Density: 572/km^{2} (1,480/sq mi)

Administrative status
  - Subordinated to: city of oblast significance of Dzerzhinsk
  - Capital of: city of oblast significance of Dzerzhinsk

Municipal status
  - Urban okrug: Dzerzhinsk Urban Okrug
  - Capital of: Dzerzhinsk Urban Okrug
- Time zone: UTC+3 (MSK)
- Postal code: 606000—606039
- Dialing code: +7 8313
- OKTMO ID: 22721000001
- City Day: Last Sunday of May
- Website: admdzr.nobl.ru

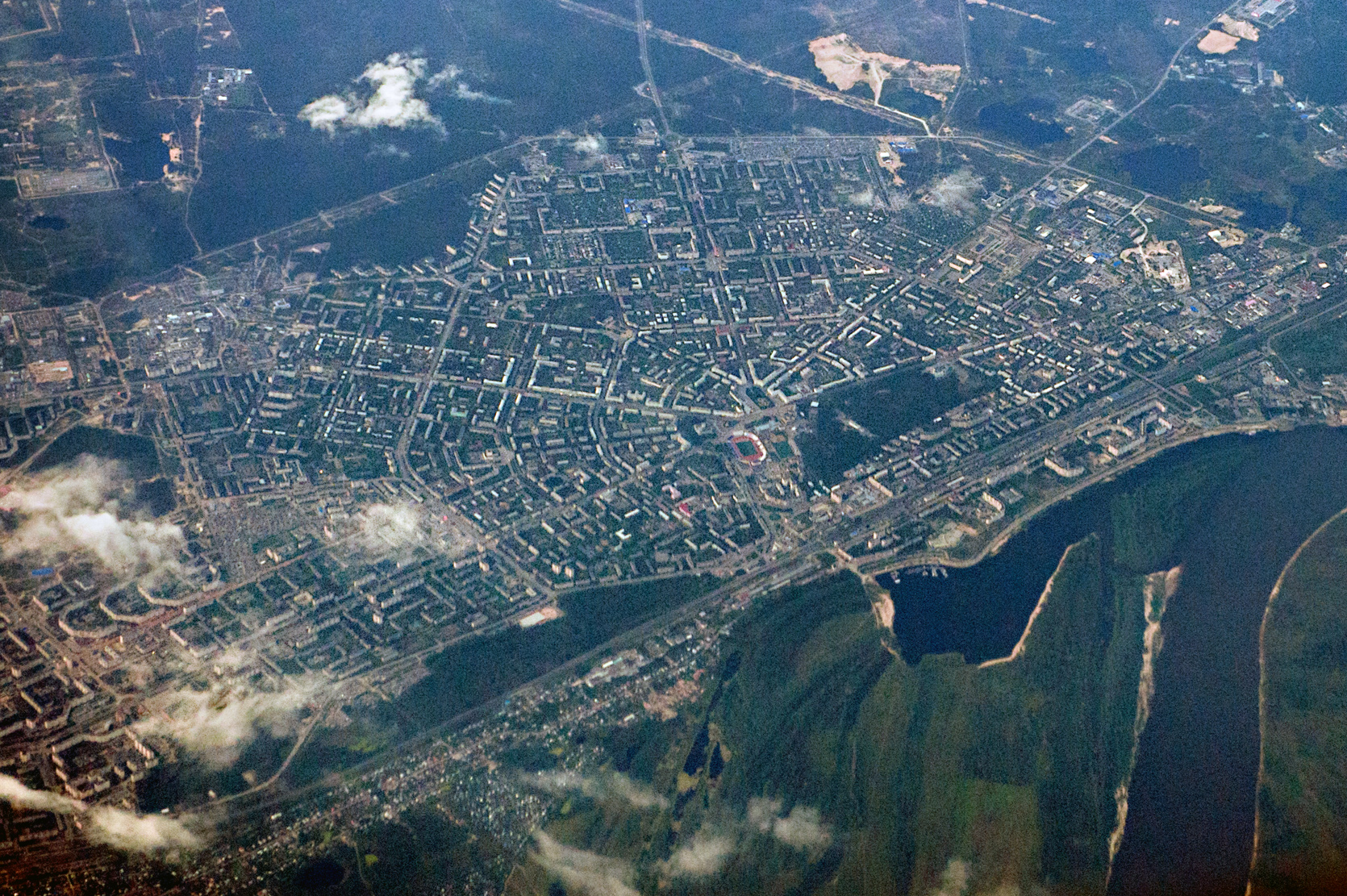
Dzerzhinsk aerial view

Dzerzhinsk (Russian: Дзержи́нск, IPA: [dzʲɪrˈʐɨnsk]) is the second-largest city in Nizhny Novgorod Oblast, Russia, located along the Oka River, about 370 kilometers (230 mi) east of Moscow and 35 kilometers (22 mi) west of Nizhny Novgorod. Population: 240,742 (2010 census); 261,334 (2002 census); 285,071 (1989 Soviet census).; 218,630 at the 2021 census.

Historical population
Year	Pop.	±%
1897	3,000	—
1926	9,000	+200.0%
1939	103,400	+1048.9%
1959	164,337	+58.9%
1970	221,291	+34.7%
1979	257,119	+16.2%
1989	285,071	+10.9%
2002	261,334	−8.3%
2010	240,742	−7.9%
2021	218,630	−9.2%
Source: Census data

It was known as Rastyapino until being renamed in 1929. Dzerzhinsk has been described as the largest centre of the chemical industry in Russia, a distinction dating back to the Soviet era. During the Soviet era, the city was also a major site of chemical weapons production.

== History ==
=== Etymology and origins ===
The area belonged to the historical district of Chernorechye (literally, "Black River country"), named for the peat-darkened water of its streams; a village on the site, Chernoye, is recorded from 1548, when it was granted to the Kirzhach Monastery among lands depopulated by the wars with Kazan. The settlement that grew into modern Dzerzhinsk is first documented separately, in 1606, as Rastyapino (Растя́пино), then belonging to the Dudin Monastery. Rastyapino grew after 1862, when a railway halt called Chyornoye opened nearby, prompting new housing to develop along the line; by 1900 the district had 13 small enterprises, chiefly sawmills, rope works and mills, employing around 1,700 people.

The First World War accelerated the settlement's industrial development. In 1915, to reduce Russia's reliance on foreign suppliers of munitions, chemical defence equipment and medicines, a mineral-acids plant — the future Korund — was founded near Rastyapino station, and a gunpowder works was relocated there from Petrograd, later becoming the Sverdlov Plant. The two plants were nationalized and expanded during the 1920s, driving rapid growth. Over six years, Rastyapino's population roughly quadrupled, from about 3,500 to 14,500 by 1929. By then, the settlement was known as "new Rastyapino", to distinguish it from the older riverside settlement (which corresponds to the present-day village of Dachny). That year the settlement was chosen as the site of an entirely new socialist city built around the chemical industry; construction began with the clearing of a pine forest to lay out a central square, and on 22 June 1929 the settlement was renamed after Felix Dzerzhinsky, the first head of the Soviet Cheka (secret police). The foundation stone of the new town was laid on 7 November 1929. Before the war, residents celebrated 22 June as the city's birthday. The anniversary is now marked on 30 March, the date in 1930 when the Presidium of the All-Russian Central Executive Committee formally granted Dzerzhinsk city status.

=== Industrialization and the 1930s ===
Even before official city status, Dzerzhinsk already had electricity, shops, a library, a hospital, clubs, schools, kindergartens and radio broadcasting, but housing could not keep pace with workers arriving from across the country: early arrivals lived in dugouts and then barracks, and permanent stone construction was slowed by shortages and poor workmanship. By January 1939 the city counted 103,415 residents, 104 multi-storey stone buildings, two Palaces of Culture, 50 libraries and 40 schools serving 24,000 children. A persistent transport gap between the residential town and its outlying factories was eased in 1933 by the opening of the first tram line, timed to the anniversary of the October Revolution. During the 1930s, Dzerzhinsk became a major national producer of chemicals and explosives. Contemporary local accounts credit the city with supplying matches across Russia and producing roughly half of the country's TNT, as well as most of its red phosphorus and cyanide alloy. New industrial facilities included the plants Oka (later Sintez), Zavodstroy (renamed Caprolactam after the war), Zarya and Rulon (later Orgsteklo), as well as the Igumnovo thermal power station, completed in 1939. The growth came under the shadow of the Great Terror. In 1937, nearly all the priests serving the surrounding villages were shot, and the district's churches were closed soon afterwards. The Trinity Church, absorbed into the city when the village of Chernoye became part of it, was shuttered in 1941 and demolished in 1966.

=== World War II ===
Dzerzhinsk became a major centre of the Soviet chemical industry during the Great Patriotic War: by the end of 1941 chemical production accounted for 28.9 percent of all industry in Gorky Oblast, and the USSR's People's Commissariat of the Chemical Industry was evacuated to the city. Its plants were together credited with supplying up to half of all Soviet explosives. The Sverdlov Plant alone produced 148 million artillery shells and mines, 5.5 million aerial bombs, 5 million anti-tank mines and 2.8 million rockets for "Katyusha" launchers, and was awarded the Order of the Red Banner in 1945. The Orgsteklo plant (Factory No. 148) developed transparent armored canopies for Il-2, Yak-1 and La-5 aircraft; its lead engineer, Boris Zverev, received a Stalin Prize for the work. Factory No. 96 (Zavodstroy), meanwhile, continued to manufacture chemical-warfare agents alongside conventional explosives throughout the war; its chemical-weapons production is discussed in more detail below, in the section "Chemical weapons production". Around 28,000 residents of Dzerzhinsk were drafted to the front, of whom nearly 9,800 were killed or went missing, while roughly 29,000 workers on the home front received awards for their wartime labour; in 1980 the city itself received the Order of the Red Banner of Labor in recognition of its wartime contribution. In 2021, in recognition of the same wartime record, Dzerzhinsk was named a City of Labour Valour by presidential decree, one of twelve Russian cities to receive the title that year.

=== Post-war development ===
After the war, Dzerzhinsk's plants returned to civilian output and pioneered 76 new chemical processes nationally, including for phenol, acetone and caprolactam. The city was gasified in 1960, and by the 1970s and 1980s about 60 percent of its workforce was employed in the chemical industry, supported by ten local research and design institutes. A general plan adopted in 1973 guided construction of the southwestern Pribrezhny microdistrict and civic buildings including the House of Books and the Yubileiny and Rossiya cinemas. The collapse of the Soviet Union disrupted long-standing supply chains and left many chemical plants in crisis, a legacy the city continued to work through the 2000s and 2010s. The population subsequently declined from a peak of 285,071 in the 1989 census to 218,630 in the 2021 census, then to an estimated 213,410 in early 2025. Ethnic Russians made up 91% of the population at the 2010 census, with Tatars (2.6%), Ukrainians, Mordvins and other minorities accounting for the remainder.

== Administrative and municipal status ==
Within the framework of administrative divisions, it is, together with three work settlements and eleven rural localities, incorporated as the city of oblast significance of Dzerzhinsk—an administrative unit with a status equal to that of the districts. As a municipal division, the city of oblast significance of Dzerzhinsk is incorporated as Dzerzhinsk Urban Okrug.

== Economy and industry ==
As of the mid-2020s, about 45,500 people are employed directly in the city's factories, representing some 44 percent of its industrial workforce. Processing industries account for roughly 77 percent of industrial output; chemicals make up 61 percent of that output, while plastics and rubber goods account for 13 percent, alongside a growing food-processing sector. Dzerzhinsk remains a major centre of Russia's chemical industry. Owing to its chemical and munitions industries, the city was, for much of the Soviet period, officially closed to foreign visitors.

=== Chemical weapons production ===
Large-scale manufacture of chemical weapons began under Soviet government control in 1941, particularly concentrating on the production of lewisite, an arsenic-based blister agent, and yperite (mustard gas). The factory producing these substances was the wartime Zavodstroy (Factory No. 96), later renamed the Caprolactam (or Kaprolaktam) Organic Glass Factory and known today as Caprolactam JSC. In addition to these arsenic-based agents, prussic acid and phosgene were produced chiefly at the Rulon (Factory No. 148) and Chernorechensky plants. Phosgene was particularly significant: despite being less notorious than mustard gas, it is estimated to have caused most chemical-weapons fatalities during the First World War.

Production had in fact been planned well before the war: a directive of 10 July 1936 called for mustard-gas production capacity of 40,000 tonnes a year at Factory No. 96, with 20,000 tonnes to be reached by January 1938, and a Defense Committee decree of December 1939 ordered operational production units in place by January 1940. Production of yperite using the Levenstein process reached 2,933 tonnes in 1941 and 480 tonnes in 1942, before the plant converted to the Zaykov process; total wartime yperite production is put at around 47,600 tonnes, alongside roughly 15,900 tonnes of lewisite. Former workers reported repeated exposure to undiluted mustard gas while working with inadequate protective equipment, and 1,585 cases of occupational illness were recorded in the plant's specialised shops in 1942 alone.

Chemical weapons production at Dzerzhinsk officially ceased in 1965, although a local historical account dates a further period of lewisite and mustard-gas production at the Kaprolaktam plant to 1964–1966. Some materials were transferred to storage units, while large amounts of waste material—frequently containing high concentrations of arsenic—were buried in dumps on the site of the factory; researchers and former workers have reported that arsenic, chlorinated organic compounds, mercury and lead remain in the surrounding soil decades later. Full dismantling of the yperite facility was commenced in 1994. As of 1998, the lewisite production unit was still not completely disassembled.

=== Major enterprises ===
As of 2008, Dzerzhinsk had 38 large industrial enterprises, which exported goods worldwide. About one thousand varieties of chemical products are produced in Dzerzhinsk. Major current and former enterprises in the city include:

- Sverdlov Plant, FSE (Federal State Enterprise), manufactures munitions, battle and industrial explosives, and chemicals for industrial purposes (phenol-formaldehyde resin, epoxy resin, carbamide-furane resin, plasticizers, hardeners of various modifications, nitrobenzene, sulphanole, acetic anhydride, various cleaners and detergents, as well as other products). The plant is included in the presidential list of the country's strategic enterprises. It is the city's largest industrial enterprise. On 20 October 2024 it was reported that the plant had been struck by Ukrainian drones. The extent of the damage to the plant was unclear.
- JSC Kristall Research Institute, a military explosives factory that is part of the Sverdlov Plant, suffered a serious explosion in June 2019.
- Korund, JSC (opened in 1915; reportedly the first factory in Russia to produce cyanide; remains in operation). This plant produces corundum for lasers and other applications. It is the oldest enterprise in Dzerzhinsk. In 2004, the plant was temporarily closed due to bankruptcy.
- Dzerzhinskhimmash, JSC (opened in 1945; makes distillation and column equipment, evaporators and heat exchangers; in bankruptcy (insolvency) proceedings since 2017).
- Sintez, JSC. Produces acetone, carbonyl iron, diethanolamine, isopropanol, methylamine, phenol, etc.
- Caprolactam, JSC (opened in 1939 as Plant No. 96; one of the largest Soviet producers of sulfur mustard and lewisite during the Second World War and the site of the first caprolactam production in the Soviet Union in 1949; its main capacity was transferred to SIBUR-Neftekhim in 2001, and the plant itself was liquidated in 2006).
- Orgsteklo, JSC (formerly manufactured specialist glass for the aeronautics market and, according to the company, specializes in producing acrylic copolymers and organic glass; halted production of its historic methyl methacrylate line in 2013 and was declared bankrupt in 2015).
- Avangard-KNAUF, JSC (a gypsum-board plant formed when the German building-materials group Knauf acquired the Soviet-era Avangard plant during its 1990s expansion into Russia, investing about 9 million DM between 1995 and 1998; a 1999 dispute with the local tax authority over the investment was resolved through a socio-economic cooperation agreement signed on 19 April 1999 between Avangard-Knauf and the Nizhny Novgorod regional administration).
- Capella (a cosmetics, personal-care and household-chemicals plant founded in 1992 as a joint venture between Dzerzhinsk's JSC Caprolactam and the German company Wella — the first Western joint venture in the city, and Wella's first factory in Eastern Europe; production began in late 1993 and was officially inaugurated on 31 May 1994. Wella exited the Russian market in 2022, and that October the plant was acquired by the Russian company Splat).
- Liebherr, JSC (Liebherr-Aerospace Nizhny Novgorod, opened in Dzerzhinsk in 2011; makes precision-machined steel components for aircraft flight-control, air-management and landing-gear systems, supplying Liebherr's own plants in Lindenberg, Germany, and Toulouse, France).
- Plastik, JSC
- Aviabor, JSC
- Oka, Yava, Orgsitilen, Zarya (no longer functioning).

== Transportation ==
Dzerzhinsk lies on the Moscow–Nizhny Novgorod railway, served by a daily Lastochka high-speed train to Moscow, and on the M-7 "Volga" federal highway; it also has its own river port on the Oka and is served by Nizhny Novgorod's Strigino International Airport, about 20 km to the east.

== Pollution ==
=== Extent of contamination ===
A September 12, 2007, study by the Blacksmith Institute named Dzerzhinsk one of the worst-polluted cities in the world. The study cited estimates of life expectancy at 42 years for men and 47 for women and a 2003 death rate exceeding the birth rate by 260%. Environmental groups such as Greenpeace have attributed poor health outcomes in the area to high levels of persistent organic chemicals, particularly dioxins. The Blacksmith Institute also identified sarin, lewisite, sulfur mustard, hydrogen cyanide, phosgene, lead, and organic chemicals among the major contaminants. Water in parts of Dzerzhinsk was reported to contain dioxins and phenol at levels up to seventeen million times the safe limit.

The city's karst topography resulted in numerous natural sinkholes, many of which were used as informal dumping grounds for factory waste; discharges such as ammonium sulfate reportedly reached groundwater within days of being released. More than 1,150 sources of toxic pollution have been identified within the city. Local health officials have linked the contamination to elevated cancer rates, reproductive and immune-system problems among newborns, and rising infertility among local men. Wartime wastewater from the chemical plants was routed through a chain of seven lakes along the Volosyanikha River, and the residential settlement of Krasny Khimik was located less than a kilometre from the main production shops.

Dzerzhinsk's environmental agency estimates that almost 300,000 tons of chemical waste were dumped in the city between 1930 and 1998. The Ecology Committee of the Russian State Duma also included Dzerzhinsk among the ten Russian cities with the most severe environmental problems.

Dzerzhinsk's City Administration, however, disputes the Blacksmith Institute report. It argues, for example, that sarin was never produced in the city and therefore could not have been a major pollutant — a claim consistent with Fedorov (p. 262, Table 7.1). Also, according to the city's health department, the average life expectancy in the city was 64 years in 2006. Askhat Kayumkov, the head of the Dront public ecological organization, which was quoted as a source by the Blacksmith Institute, states that his organization never provided the Blacksmith Institute with data of any kind. He also disputes the claim that Dzerzhinsk is one of the most polluted cities in Russia, let alone in the world.

=== Remediation efforts ===
Although environmental conditions have improved substantially over the past 80 years — largely because polluting factories have closed or gone bankrupt — several sites in and around the city remain contaminated, including the 110-hectare Igumnovo landfill, toxic waste burial grounds, and the so-called "White Sea", a lagoon of discarded chemical waste. These sites remain under environmental monitoring.

In June 2019 a powerful explosion at State Research Institute Kristall injured 79 people and destroyed 180 homes in the neighbourhood.

After unsuccessful tenders in 2012–13, GazEnergoStroy was selected for cleanup in 2016. Work to eliminate the "Black Hole" landfill began, and the waste-incineration infrastructure was completed by 2019. According to Pravda PFO, the amount of waste was 57% greater than expected. The cleanup was expected to continue until autumn 2021 and require an additional 238 million rubles in federal funding; however, the request for additional funding was denied. According to Argumenty i Fakty – Nizhny Novgorod, the equipment downtime was 49%, and further delay was expected. Reclamation works on "White Sea" and Igumnovo were ongoing in 2019 by GazEnergoStroy.

== Urban planning and architecture ==
Most of central Dzerzhinsk was built after the Second World War according to a master plan by the city's first chief architect, Alexey Kusakin. He was a practitioner of the Leningrad (St. Petersburg) school of architecture, and his earlier work in Magnitogorsk, in the southern Urals, also influenced Dzerzhinsk's design. Kusakin (1908–1996) later documented the city's construction in his 1957 book, Stroitelstvo goroda Dzerzhinska. Landmark buildings in the Stalinist style include the "House with a Spire" on Mayakovskogo Street, popularly known as the city's "Eiffel Tower"; the 17-entrance "Collective Farm House" on Lenina Avenue, which also houses the Pushkin Library; and a residential ensemble with a formal courtyard (cour d'honneur) on Klyukvina Street. Constructivist survivals from the 1930s include the Dzerzhinsk Red Army Chemical College, in use since 1932, and a communal dormitory on Uchebny Lane known locally as the "ship house" for the glazed passages linking its residential blocks. The city is also noted for large-scale Soviet mosaics, among them "Underwater World" on the facade of the central swimming pool and a "Space Age" mosaic on the House of Books.

== Sights ==
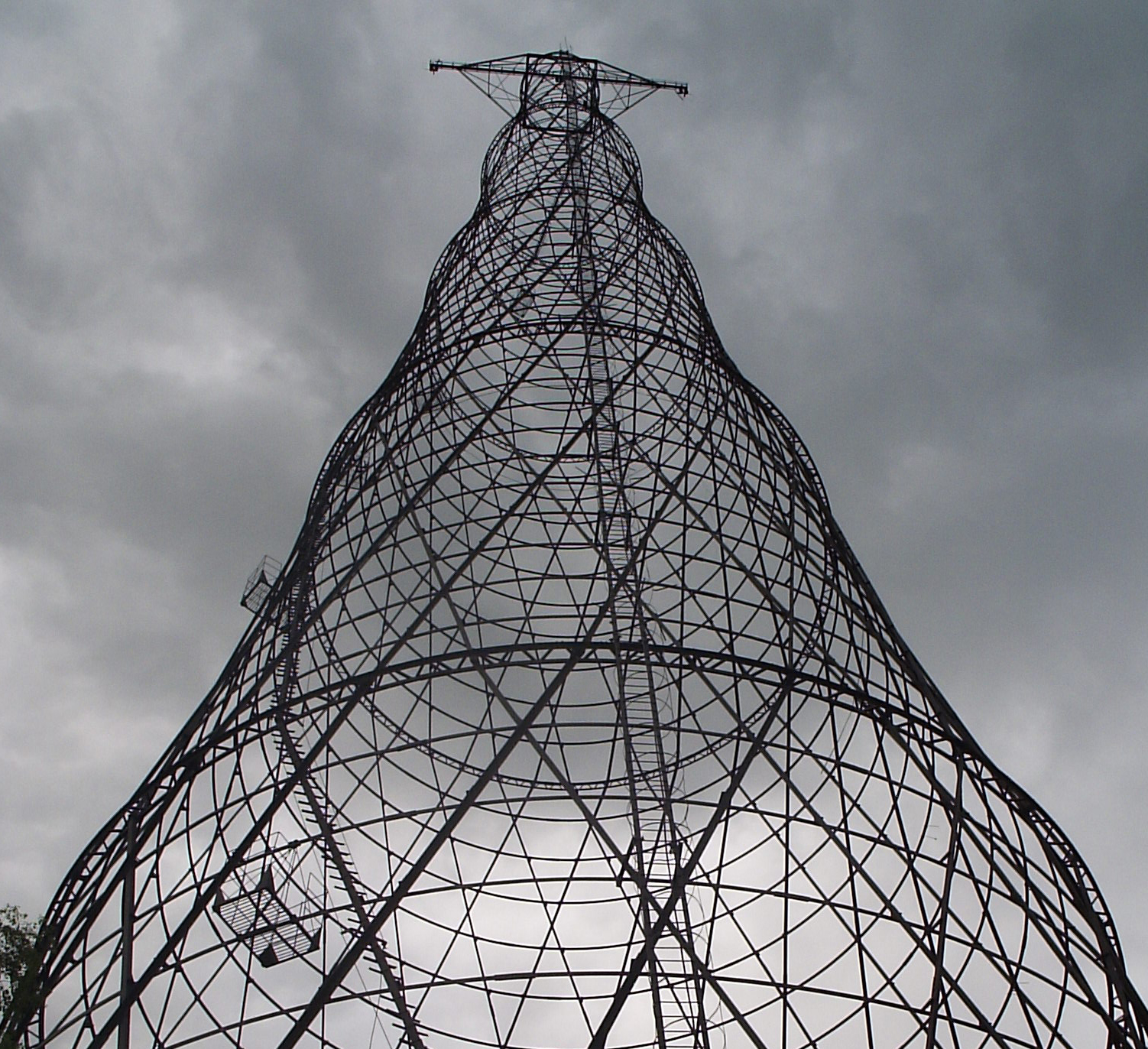
Shukhov Tower on the Oka River near Dzerzhinsk (about 12 km away from the city centre)

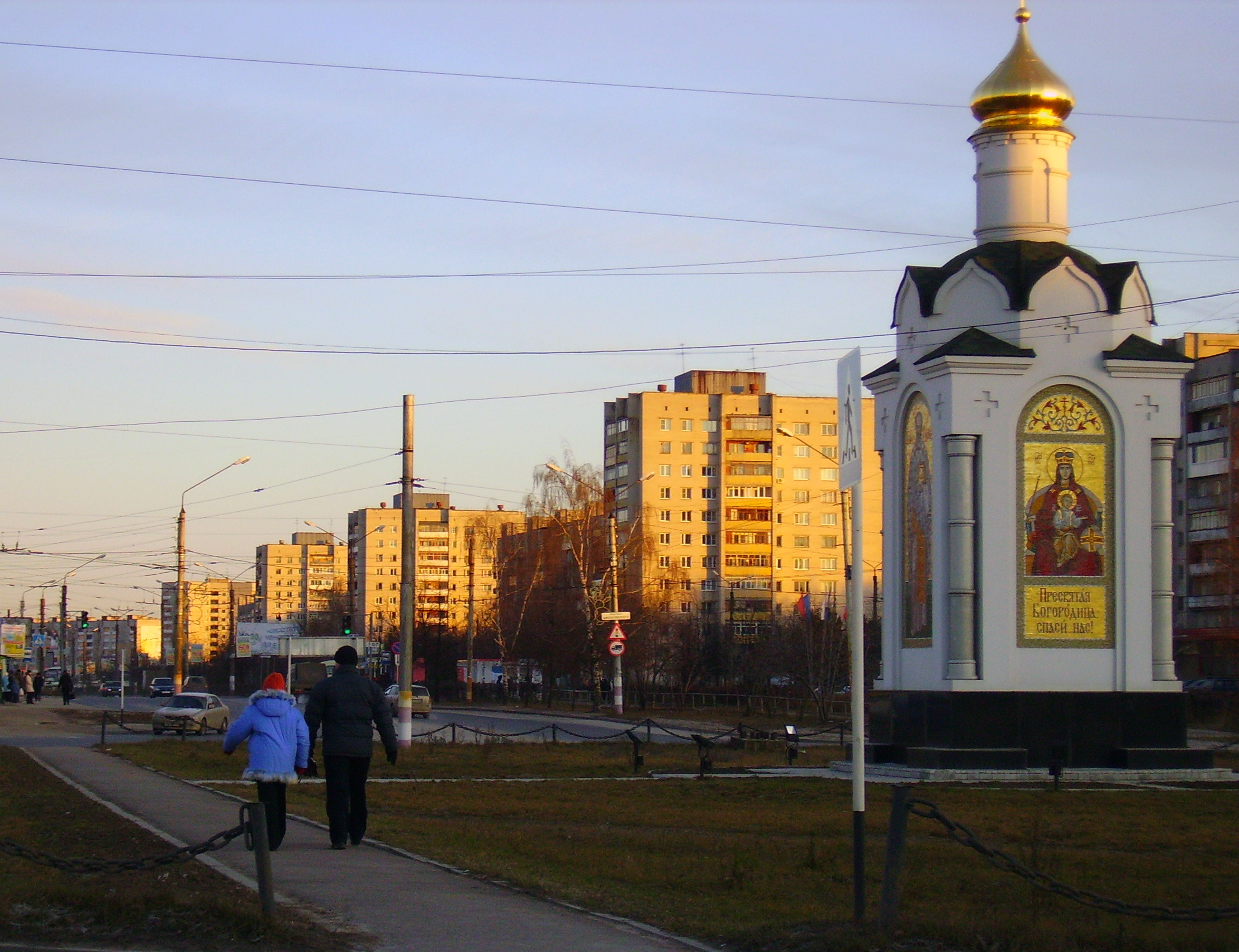
Tsiolkovskogo Avenue

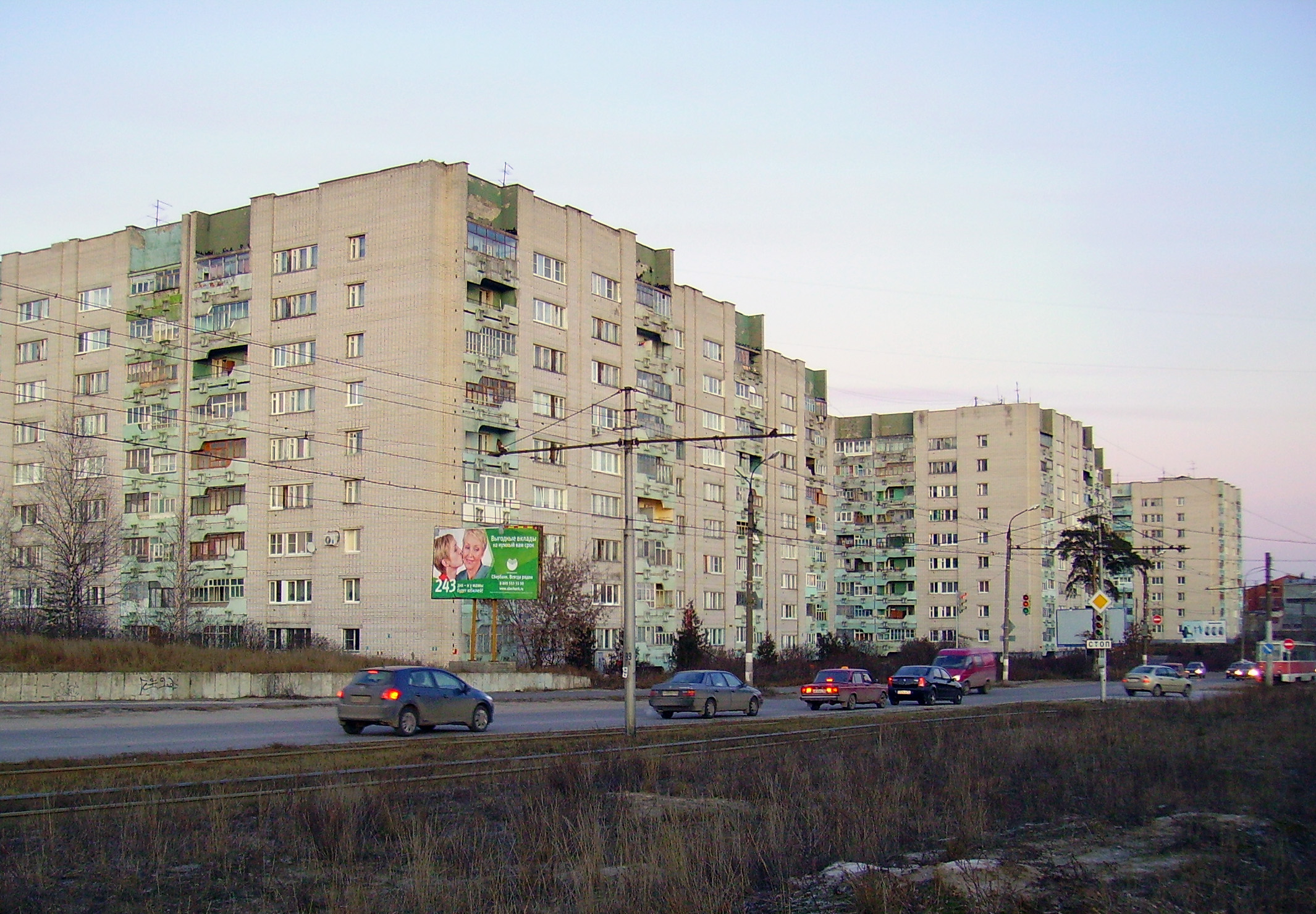
Corner of Samokhvalova Street & Lenina Avenue

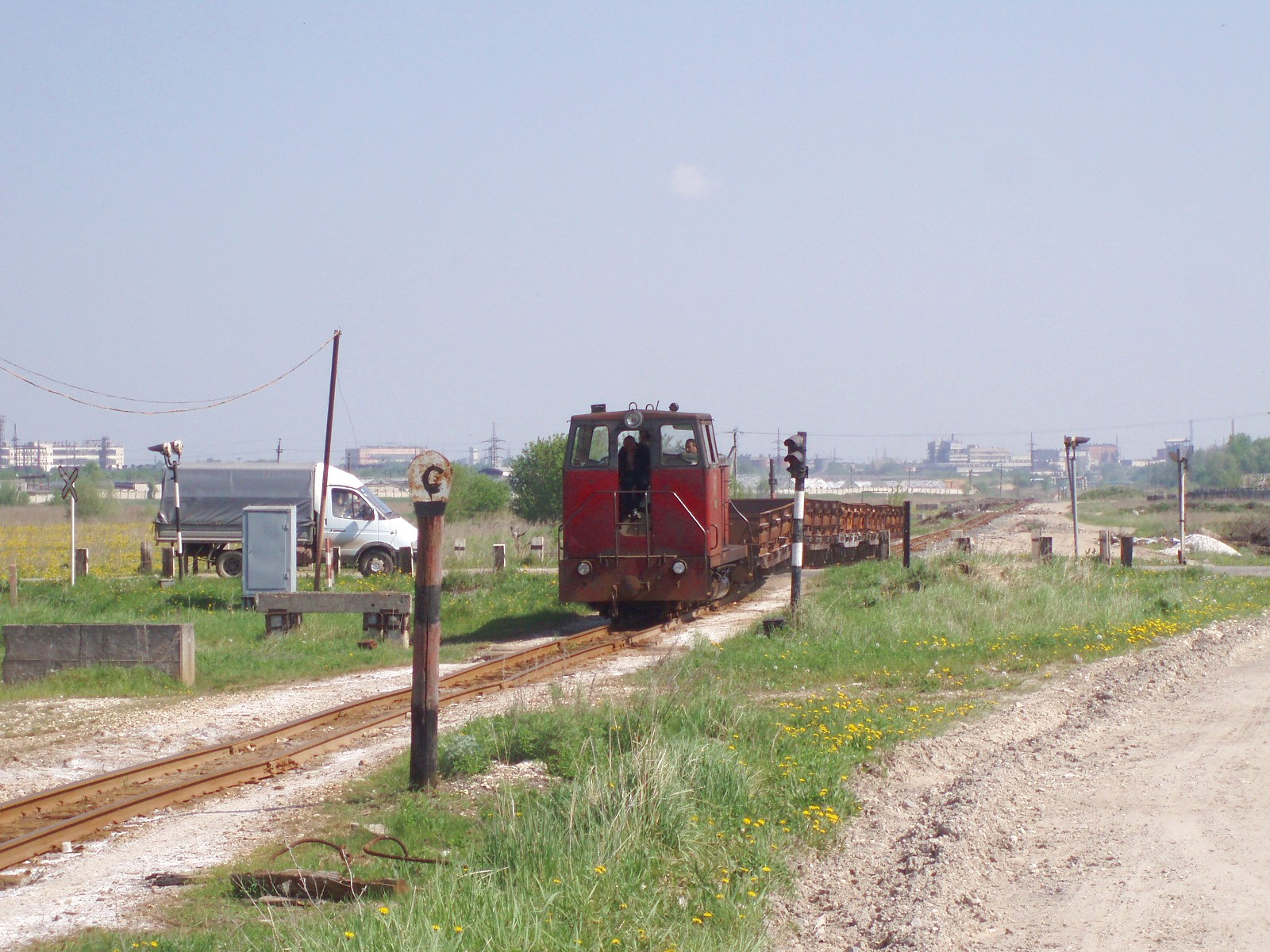
Narrow gauge railway of Caprolactam factory

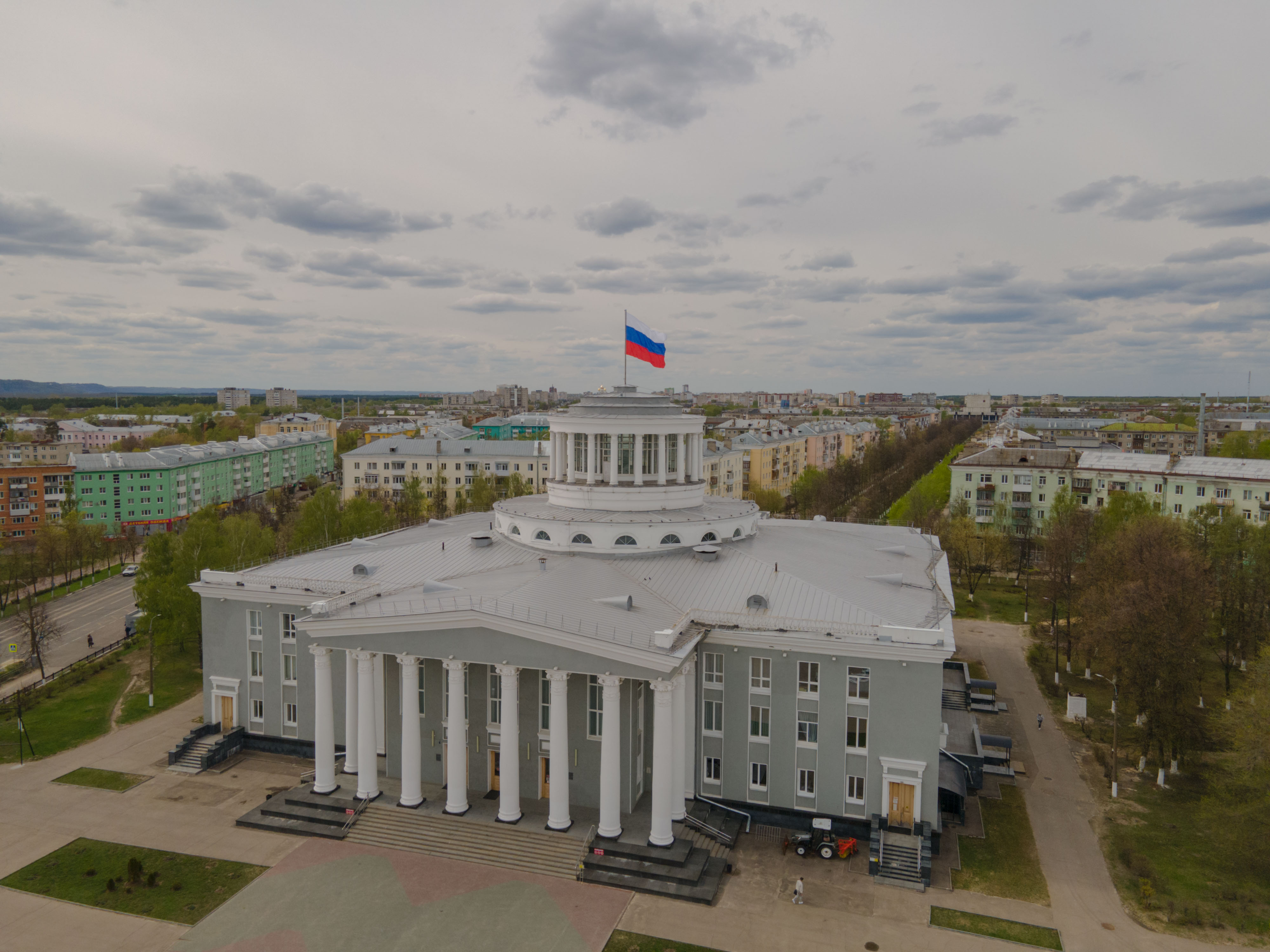
Palace of Culture of Chemists

Shukhov Tower on the Oka River, a 128-meter (420 ft) steel lattice hyperboloid tower engineered by Vladimir Shukhov, stands near Dzerzhinsk on the left bank of the Oka River. It is the only surviving tower of six hyperboloid towers, built in three pairs of different heights (128, 68 and 20 metres) between 1927 and 1929 to carry a 110-kilovolt power line across the river; the four smaller towers were later dismantled for scrap after the line was rerouted, and one of the two remaining 128-metre towers was itself illegally dismantled for scrap metal in the spring of 2005. In 2019, regional tourism officials proposed relocating the surviving tower to an industrial-tourism park in the Vyksa district. As of a March 2026 announcement, however, the tower still stood at its original site: Alexander Shumilkin, head of the regional branch of ICOMOS, said his organization was preparing documentation to nominate it for UNESCO's Tentative List of World Heritage Sites, citing recently broadened UNESCO criteria for recognising engineering achievements. If the nomination eventually succeeds, it would give Nizhny Novgorod Oblast its first UNESCO World Heritage Site.

The city's local history museum, which marked its 90th anniversary in 2020, features interactive exhibits on the area's natural history, archaeology and urban development, including a large-scale model of pre-war Dzerzhinsk; the Nikolai Rubtsov Literary Museum, housed within the Collective Farm House, is devoted to the poet's little-documented years in the Nizhny Novgorod region. A monument to Vladimir Mayakovsky by the sculptor Alexei Anisimov has stood on the square named for the poet since the 1960s.

== Notable people ==
- Sergey Chigrakov (born 1961), rock musician and songwriter
- Aleksandr Demenshin (born 1986), former Russian professional football player
- Oleg Deripaska (born 1968), Russian entrepreneur and billionaire
- Maxim Emelyanychev (born 1988), conductor, pianist, harpsichordist and cornetist
- Izolda Izvitskaya (1932–1971), Soviet film actress, known for her leading role in The Forty-First (1956)
- Eduard Limonov (1943–2020), Russian writer and politician
- Natali (born 1974), Russian pop singer and songwriter
- Pavel Otdelnov (born 1979), Russian artist who dedicated the project Promzona to Dzerzhinsk
- Irina Voronina (born 1977), American model and Playboy Playmate
- Léon Zack (1892–1980), Russian poet, artist, graphic artist, stage designer and sculptor

== International relations ==
=== Twin towns and sister cities ===
Dzerzhinsk is twinned with:

- Bitterfeld-Wolfen, Germany since 1996
- Grodno, Belarus since 2005
- Druskininkai, Lithuania since 2009
- Zelenodolsk, Russia since 2011
- Novopolotsk, Belarus since 2025

== Documentary films ==
- Vladimir Gladyshev (director); S. Gladysheva, G. Kuzmin (writers); Igor Serov (cinematography) (1979). В нашем городе над Окой [In Our City on the Oka] (Documentary film) (in Russian). Gorky Television.
- Мой город Дзержинск [My City, Dzerzhinsk] (Documentary film) (in Russian). Lenfilm. 1990.
