= Shtamp Machine-Building Plant =

Coordinates: 54°12′40″N 37°38′49″E

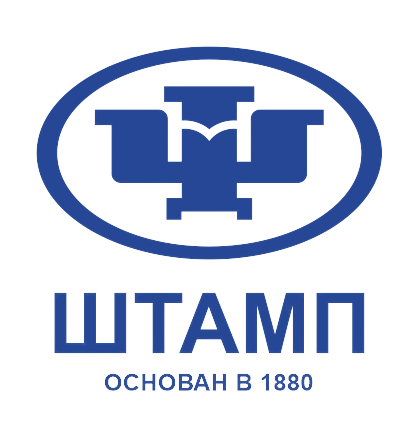

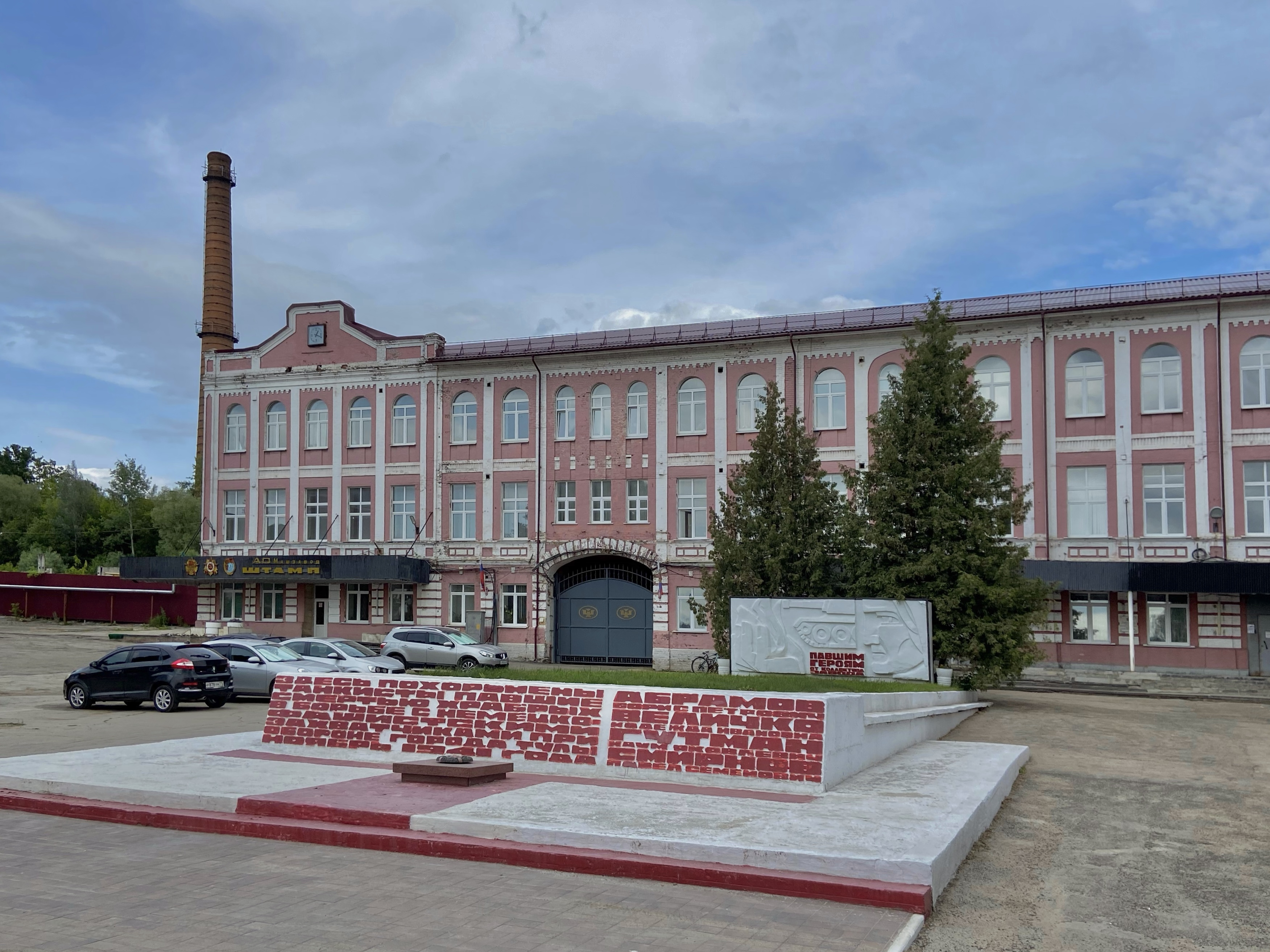
- Native name: АО "Машзавод «Штамп»
- Type: Public company
- Industry: Defense industry
- Headquarters: Tula, Russia
- Products: Artillery, Self-propelled artillery, Howitzers, Multiple rocket launchers, Military vehicles

Shtamp Machine-Building Plant (Russian: Акционерное общество «Машиностроительный завод „Штамп“ им. Б. Л. Ванникова») is a company based in Tula, Russia. It is part of Techmash (Rostec group).

Formerly a major producer of ammunition for multiple rocket launchers, the Shtamp Machine-Building Plant has converted to production of household appliances, including samovars, stoves, heaters, fire extinguishers, and washing machines.

== Products ==
The main products of the Stamp plant:

- military products (cartridge belt links);
- more than 20 types of roasting, electric and combined samovars of various shapes and volumes;
- cabins for special equipment;
- belt conveyors;
- industrial shredders.

== Awards ==
- 1921 (April) — Order of the Red Banner of Labor of the RSFSR (for labor heroism shown in providing ammunition to the Red Army);
- 1945 (September) — Order of the Patriotic War I degree (for the successful fulfillment of the tasks of the State Defense Committee for the restoration of the plant and the organization of production of defense products);
- 1980 — Order of the October Revolution (for the achieved production successes and in connection with the centenary of its foundation).
