= Caprolactam (plant) =

- Plant administration building, 2010
- Native name: Russian: Капролактам
- Formerly: Zavodstroy, Plant No. 96, PO Box No. 16
- Industry: Chemical industry
- Founded: 1939
- Defunct: 2011
- Fate: Incorporated into OAO SIBUR-Neftekhim
- Headquarters: Dzerzhinsk, Nizhny Novgorod Oblast, Russia
- Products: Chlorine, caustic soda, polyvinyl chloride, caprolactam, ethylene oxide, glycols, surfactants

Caprolactam (Russian: Капролактам, transliterated Kaprolaktam) was a chemical plant in Dzerzhinsk, Nizhny Novgorod Oblast, Russia, that operated from 1939 to 2011. Known in its early decades as Zavodstroy and designated Plant No. 96, it was built in part as a facility of the Soviet military chemical industry and during the Second World War became one of the USSR's largest producers of the chemical warfare agents sulfur mustard and lewisite. In 1949 the first caprolactam produced in the Soviet Union was obtained at the plant, which was later named after the compound. By the late 1970s it was one of the largest chemical enterprises in Dzerzhinsk, accounting for about 30 per cent of the town's chemical output.

The enterprise was reorganised as an open joint-stock company in 1992, and its production facilities passed to SIBUR in 2000–2001. The company OAO Caprolactam was liquidated in 2006, while the plant continued to operate until 2011, when it was incorporated directly into OAO SIBUR-Neftekhim.

== Names ==
The construction site begun in 1934 was known as Zavodstroy, a name that remained in use for the works after production started. By 1936 the plant had also been designated Plant No. 96, the name under which it was commissioned in 1939, and it carried the secret postal designation PO Box No. 16. It became the Caprolactam chemical combine in 1966. The same year the plant was awarded the Order of Lenin "for the successful fulfilment of the tasks of the post-war years and the early completion of the seven-year plan", and the honorific entered its name; by 1970 it operated as the Caprolactam Production Association, and in the 1980s was known as the Dzerzhinsk Order of Lenin Caprolactam Production Association.

== History ==
=== Construction and early operation ===
The central plant laboratory building

A commission of Glavkhimprom, the Soviet chemical industry's main directorate, selected the site for a chlorine combine on 27 September 1933; construction began in February 1934 and employed up to 15,000 people working mainly with hand tools. The first three managers of the project were subjected to political repression, and Yuly Kaganovich, who replaced them in 1937, became the plant's first director. The central plant laboratory began work in November 1939, and the plant began operating on 14 December 1939, when the chlorine unit was commissioned; by 1941 it produced 27 types of chemical product. On 31 December 1939 a government commission recorded the production of on-specification ethylene from pyrolysis gas piped from Gorky; according to A. A. Sizov, the author of a published history of the enterprise, "for the first time in the country the process of separating pyrolysis gas was successfully mastered".

=== Chemical weapons and the Second World War ===
The plant was also established as part of the Soviet military chemical industry. An order of the People's Commissariat of Heavy Industry of 10 July 1936 required Plant No. 96 to build capacity for 40,000 tonnes of sulfur mustard and 3,000 tonnes of phosgene, and a decree of the Defence Committee of 14 December 1939 required the first-stage mustard and lewisite units to be commissioned in January 1940; production of agents began in 1939. Levinstein-process sulfur mustard was made in Unit No. 3 and lewisite in Units 14 and 15, which together produced 15,900 tonnes of lewisite.

During the war the plant also made chlorine, toluene and ethyl fluid, a tetraethyllead-based antiknock additive for aircraft engines, and in 1944 became the first in the country to make polyvinyl chloride resin by the suspension process. A semi-continuous lewisite process introduced in 1942 raised output 18.5-fold over 1941, and by 1943 the plant was filling up to 150,000 chemical artillery shells a month; for 25 months it held the challenge Red Banner of the State Defence Committee. According to the regional history project Gorky. Symbol of Victory, it accounted for 79 per cent of all Soviet lewisite and 66 per cent of sulfur mustard.

The manufacture of chemical weapons resulted in widespread exposure and poisoning among the workforce. Isaak Kotlyar, an engineer in Unit No. 3 who later published a memoir, wrote that "the air in the unit was saturated with mustard vapour … Neither the gas mask, nor rubber clothing and gloves protected against damage to the skin, the mucous membrane of the eyes and the respiratory tract. Each shift therefore had a double complement. Some worked while others were being treated in hospital or at the enterprise's preventive-care facility." Of the seven chiefs the unit had between 1941 and 1950, he wrote that "all of them left the unit classified as Group II disabled and died between the ages of 40 and 60." An explosion in the mustard building in October 1941 and the leaks that followed poisoned 765 people, mostly women. Documents cited by the historian Vladimir Tolz record ten deaths and more than two thousand poisonings in the mustard unit in 1942 alone; the chemical facilities had extraterritorial status and sanitary inspectors were not admitted. The plant's first chief engineer, Naum Goldberg, was convicted in the autumn of 1941 over failures said to have caused widespread injury and occupational disease in the agent units, and was released in 1947.

=== Post-war development ===
After the war the plant was chosen to host production of caprolactam, a feedstock for polyamide fibres and plastics, using equipment obtained from Germany as reparations and unloaded by prisoners of war. On 10 May 1949 the government was informed that the first domestically produced caprolactam had been obtained from phenol, 583 tonnes being made that year, and in 1950 a group of specialists led by Zalman Smolyan received a State Stalin Prize for the work. Several products were made in the Soviet Union for the first time at the plant, among them isopropyl alcohol and perchlorovinyl resin, as well as polyvinyl chloride by the suspension and bulk processes, and specialists from Dzerzhinsk later helped commission caprolactam units in Kemerovo, Rustavi, Shchyokino and Stara Zagora in Bulgaria. A chlorine electrolyser developed at the plant raised unit capacity by 40 per cent and was adopted at eight Soviet chlorine plants; Kaganovich, chief engineer Mikhail Khrulyov and others received a Stalin Prize for it in 1949.

=== 1960 explosion ===
On 12 February 1960 the plant suffered the worst disaster in its history. A large-diameter cast-iron gate valve cracked in Unit No. 6, which produced ethylene and propylene; about ten minutes after pyrolysis gas began to escape, an explosion destroyed the unit, killing all 24 members of Shift G. Metal fatigue was given as the official cause, and the state commission of inquiry was headed by Frol Kozlov, then a member of the Soviet leadership. The victims were buried at different times so that the funerals would not turn into a spontaneous demonstration; the director, Gennady Neopikhanov, was dismissed, and Khrulyov received a severe reprimand. Information about the accident was classified in the Soviet period.

=== Expansion, 1960s–1980s ===
An experimental unit opened in 1962 became the origin of the Dzerzhinsk plant Plastik. Mark Sedov, appointed director in 1970, led the production association for eighteen years, during which peroxide compounds were produced in the Soviet Union for the first time and district water treatment facilities were built. Two of the plant's workers were made Hero of Socialist Labour: the senior operator Vladimir Sergeyev in 1966 and Sedov in 1976. Production of polyvinyl chloride and cable plasticate began in 1970 using French technology, and of surfactants in 1988 using Italian technology. The largest project of the period was a petrochemical complex for ethylene oxide and glycols, built from 1977 with Western technology and equipment and opened on 9 April 1982; it became a separate plant in 1987. Caprolactam production itself, which had given the plant its name, was wound down during the 1980s.

=== Post-Soviet crisis and dissolution ===
The plant seen from the west

The enterprise was reorganised as an open joint-stock company in 1992. By 1994 its range of industrial and consumer products exceeded 300 items, about 30 per cent of which were exported, and with the German company Wella it founded the hair-care joint venture Capella. The break-up of Soviet economic ties then brought a crisis: ethylene oxide production stood idle from 19 April 1996 to 6 June 1997 after its ethylene supplier cut off deliveries over unpaid debts. According to the newspaper Promyshlenny vestnik the enterprise ended 1996 with wage arrears and a workforce more than 2,000 smaller than a year earlier, and the possibility of declaring the enterprise bankrupt was discussed in the regional administration but was not taken up. External administration was introduced in 1998; in December 2000 the enterprise was transferred to SIBUR, and from 2001 its production facilities formed part of OAO SIBUR-Neftekhim.

On 26 December 2006 the Arbitration Court of Nizhny Novgorod Oblast ordered the liquidation of OAO Caprolactam as a separate legal entity; the plant itself continued to operate within SIBUR-Neftekhim. On 3 March 2011 SIBUR-Neftekhim announced the end of the Caprolactam plant as a separate structural unit, its production facilities being incorporated directly into the company; a company executive explained that the name had become obsolete, because the compound had not been produced at the site since the 1980s. The Oka-Polymer industrial park was launched on the former plant site in 2012. The plant and the industrial zone around it are the subject of Promzona, an art project about the industrial landscape of Dzerzhinsk.

== Products ==
By the late 1970s the product range numbered about a hundred items, including chlorine and caustic soda, dichloroethane and vinyl chloride, ethylene glycol, caprolactam and polyvinyl chloride, and up to ten of its products were made nowhere else in the USSR. Consumer goods were made from the 1950s.

== Social infrastructure ==
Like many major Soviet industrial enterprises, the plant maintained extensive social infrastructure, including the Palace of Culture of Chemists, the Kaprolaktamovets sports complex, clinics, kindergartens, a pioneer camp and housing totalling 340,000 square metres by 1979. The Palace of Culture, opened in 1959, became the main cultural venue of Dzerzhinsk.

== Environmental legacy ==
After the war the mustard and lewisite units and the munitions-filling unit were shut down and mothballed, and mustard remaining in rail tank cars was sent to a military chemical range near Arys to be burned. Mass production of chemical warfare agents in the town ended in the early 1950s, and their production at Caprolactam ceased in the 1970s. After Russia acceded to the Chemical Weapons Convention in 1997 the former facilities were dismantled and decontaminated and the production buildings demolished under a federal programme. Of the 24 chemical-weapons production facilities declared by Russia upon accession, four were at Caprolactam: the mustard plant, two lewisite lines and the munitions-filling unit; elimination of the lewisite facility was financed by the European Union under the TACIS programme.

Waste from mustard and lewisite production had been buried beyond the plant fence and discharged into open reservoirs during and after the war. When the special units were mothballed, according to Kotlyar, "the floors were broken up and contaminated soil was removed to a depth of about a metre. The soil was taken to the plant dump." The sludge reservoir known as the "White Sea" received waste from the site from December 1973 until it was taken out of service in 2013, holding about 3.9 million cubic metres over 66.78 hectares; the ecologist Alexey Yablokov described it as without parallel in Europe in its characteristics and scale. It was capped and remediated between 2018 and 2020.

== See also ==
- Narrow-gauge railway of Caprolactam factory

== Sources ==
- Sizov, A. A. (1979). Становление: очерки истории объединения «Капролактам». 1939—1979 [Coming into being: essays on the history of the Kaprolaktam association, 1939–1979] (in Russian). Photographs by Ye. K. Golubev. Gorky: Volgo-Vyatskoye Book Publishers. p. 159.
- Kotlyar, I. B. (2001). В городе большой химии: воспоминания [In the city of big chemistry: a memoir] (in Russian). Moscow: Greenpeace Council. p. 64.
