= Kalinin Plant =

- Industry: Defense Industry
- Founded: 1869
- Headquarters: Saint Petersburg, Russia
- Products: Ammunition, Munitions
- Parent: Techmash
- Website: www.zik-spb.ru

Kalinin Plant Production Association (Russian: Завод имени М. И. Калинина) is a company based in Saint Petersburg, Russia. It is currently part of Techmash (Rostec group).

The Kalinin Plant Production Association produces munitions for the military. It is now involved in large-scale conversion from military to civil production.

The factory was founded in 1869 as the St. Petersburg Ammunition Factory; it was renamed after M. I. Kalinin in 1922.

== Famous employees ==
- A Mikhailovskaya Military Artillery Academy graduate has been working at the factory since 1870. Painter Nikolai Yaroshenko depicted a worker of this plant in the painting "Stoker".
- Mikhail Kalinin Ivanovich worked in 1906-1907 and in 1917, after whom the plant is named.
- Vladimir Rdultovsky Iosifovich — since 1926, he held the position of deputy head of the design bureau.
