= Aleksandr Demenshin =

Russian footballer

Personal information
- Full name: Aleksandr Dmitriyevich Demenshin
- Date of birth: 2 September 1986 (age 40)
- Place of birth: Dzerzhinsk, Gorky Oblast, Russian SFSR
- Height: 1.77 m (5 ft 10 in)
- Position: Midfielder

Senior career*
Years	Team	Apps	(Gls)
2003	FC Torpedo-Viktoria Nizhny Novgorod (amateur)		
2004	FC Kvarts Bor		
2005–2006	FC Telma-Vodnik Nizhny Novgorod		
2007	FC Nizhny Novgorod-Volga-2		
2008	FC Fakel Voronezh (amateur)		
2008	FC Nizhny Novgorod	4	(0)
2008	FC Nizhny Novgorod-2		
2009	FC Nizhny Novgorod	2	(0)
2009–2011	FC Nizhny Novgorod-2		
2012–2013	FC Torpedo Pavlovo (amateur)		
2014	FC Nizhny Novgorod (amateur)		
- * Club domestic league appearances and goals

Aleksandr Dmitriyevich Demenshin (Russian: Александр Дмитриевич Деменьшин; born 2 September 1986) is a former Russian professional football player.

== Club career ==
He played in the Russian Football National League for FC Nizhny Novgorod in 2009.

== See also ==
- Football in Russia
