= Narrow-gauge railway of Caprolactam factory =

Coordinates: 56.215965°N 43.53181°E

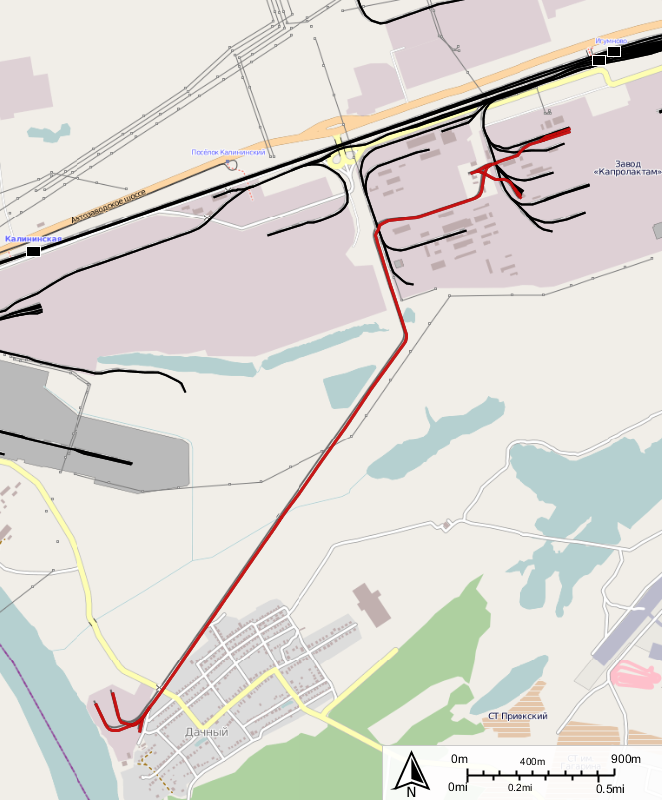

Overview
- Locale: Nizhny Novgorod Oblast, Russia
- Termini: Dzerzhinsk

Service
- Type: Narrow-gauge railway
- Operator: ОАО «Сибур-Нефтехим»

History
- Opened: 1939
- Closed: 2013

Technical
- Line length: 8 kilometres (5.0 mi)
- Track gauge: 750 mm (2 ft 5 1/2 in)

The narrow-gauge railroad of Caprolactam factory in Datchnij settlement is the only railway in Russia hauling salt trains. It is located in Dzerzhinsk. The railway had a total length of 8 km. It was opened in 1939, and closed in 2013; the track gauge is 750 mm (2 ft 5 1/2 in).

== Current status ==
The locomotive depot is located at the chemical plant "Caprolactam" which is located in the city of Dzerzhinsk, Nizhny Novgorod Oblast. The main task of the narrow-gauge railway is transporting salt from a nearby pier to the chemical plant in the industrial zone. Traffic on the railway varies each day, depending on how much salt must be delivered to the factory, but usually not less than four per day.

== Rolling stock ==
=== Locomotives ===
- TU8 – №0393
- TU7A – №3272, №2892, №2913, №2136 и ТУ7 – №2557

=== Railroad car ===
- Flatcar
- Tank car
- Snow blower

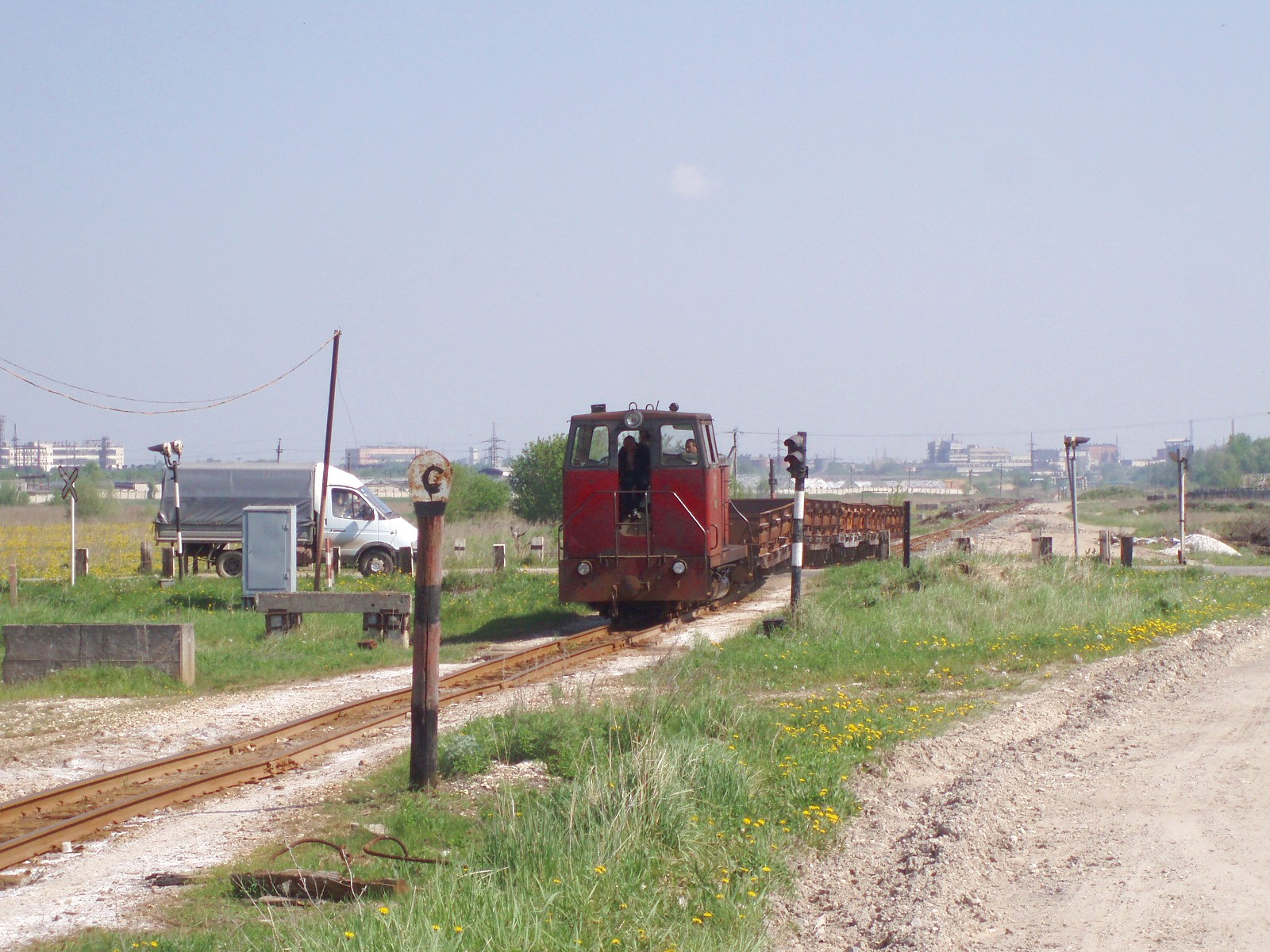
Caprolactam factory 2007

== See also ==
- Narrow-gauge railways in Russia
