= Nikolai Yaroshenko =

Russian painter (1846–1898)

- Николай Ярошенко (Russian); Микола Ярошенко (Ukrainian)
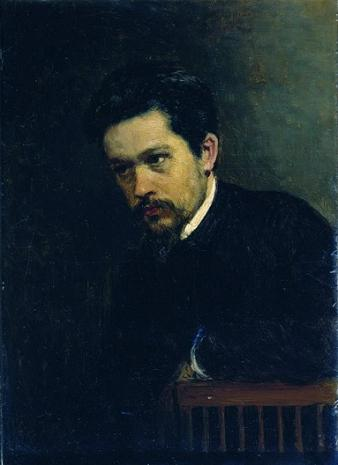
- Self-portrait (1895)
- Born: 13 December [O.S. 1 December] 1846; Poltava, Russian Empire (now Ukraine)
- Died: 7 July [O.S. 25 June] 1898; Kislovodsk, Russian Empire
- Occupation: Painter

Nikolai Alexandrovich Yaroshenko (Russian: Николай Александрович Ярошенко; (Note: The given name and patronymic is also rendered as Nikolai and Aleksandrovich respectively) Ukrainian: Микола Олександрович Ярошенко, romanized: Mykola Oleksandrovych Yaroshenko; 13 December [O.S. 1 December] 1846 – 7 July [O.S. 25 June] 1898) was a Russian painter of Ukrainian origin.

Yaroshenko painted is famous for his portraits, genre paintings, and drawings. His genre paintings usually depict hardships faced in the Russian Empire. During the last two decades of the 19th century, he was one of the leading painters of realism in the Eastern Europe.

== Biography ==
Nikolai Yaroshenko was born in Poltava to the family of an officer (later Major General) of the Imperial Russian Army, Alexander Mikhailovich Yaroshenko (1807–1876). His father wanted him to follow in his footsteps pursuing a military career, and did not place importance on his artistic talent but did not hinder his drawing activities. His mother, Lyubov Vasilyevna (née Mishchenko; 1822–1890), was the daughter of a Poltava landowner, retired lieutenant Vasily Mishchenko.

In Poltava, Nikolai Yaroshenko's first painting teacher was the former serf Ivan Kondratyevich Zaitsev (1805–1887), to whom the student remained sincerely grateful throughout his life and later painted his portrait.

In 1855, at the age of nine, Nikolai was enrolled in the Poltava Cadet Corps. In 1856, through his father's efforts, he was transferred to the First Cadet Corps in Saint Petersburg. In October 1862, he participated in a mass protest by cadets against the battalion commander's abusive nitpicking. During the investigation, he was identified as one of the "instigators" (Nikolai took responsibility for organizing the protest alongside the future General of the Cavalry and military writer N. N. Sukhotin), for which he was stripped of his corporal rank and spent 10 days in the guardhouse. After completing the cadet corps, he enrolled in the Pavlovsk Infantry School in 1863. In May 1864, he transferred to the Mikhailovskoe Artillery School, graduating among the top students in 1865. From late 1865, he served in the 9th Artillery Brigade, stationed in Valkovsky Uyezd of Kharkov Governorate.

After serving two years as an officer in the 9th Battery, he enrolled in the Mikhailovskaya Military Artillery Academy in Saint Petersburg while simultaneously attending the Imperial Academy of Arts. Additionally, Yaroshenko took private drawing lessons, worked in the studio of Adrian Markovich Volkov (1829–1873), and attended evening classes at the school of the Imperial Society for the Encouragement of the Arts, where Ivan Kramskoi taught at the time.

Graduating with distinction from the Mikhailovskaya Artillery Academy in 1870, with early promotion to the rank of staff captain for outstanding academic achievements, Nikolai Yaroshenko was appointed head of the stamping workshop in the equipment department of the Saint Petersburg Cartridge Factory. He served in managerial roles at this factory until his retirement with the rank of Major General.

In 1874, he completed his studies at the Academy of Arts externally. During his studies, he became close to the Peredvizhniki artists and writers who were regular contributors to the journal Otechestvennye Zapiski. The intelligentsia gathered at "Saturday" meetings in his apartment. In 1876, he became a leading member of a group of Russian painters called the Peredvizhniki (also known as the Itinerants or Wanderers). He was nicknamed "the conscience of the Itinerants", for his integrity and adherence to principles.

Yaroshenko spent some years in the regions of Poltava and Chernigov, and his later years in Kislovodsk, in the Caucasus Mountains, where he moved due to ill health. He died of phthisis (pulmonary tuberculosis or consumption) in Kislovodsk on 7 July [O.S. 25 June] 1898 and was buried there.

In 1875, Yaroshenko debuted at the 4th Peredvizhniki Exhibition with the painting Nevsky Prospect. The following year, he became a member of the Association of Traveling Art Exhibitions (Peredvizhniki) and was immediately elected to its board. Alongside Ivan Nikolaevich Kramskoi, he was one of the main ideologists of the Peredvizhniki movement. Kramskoi was called the "mind" of the movement, while Yaroshenko was its "conscience".

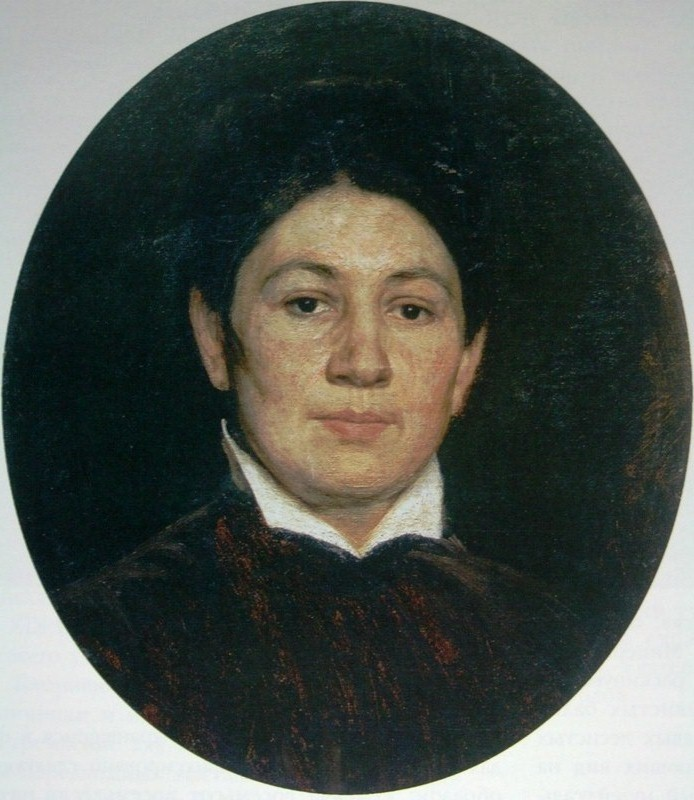
Nikolai Yaroshenko. Portrait of His Wife. 1880s, Nikolai Yaroshenko Memorial Museum-Estate, Kislovodsk.

In 1874, Yaroshenko married Maria Pavlovna Nevrotina, a Bestuzhev Courses student and public activist. The newlyweds visited Nikolai's family in Poltava, then traveled to Pyatigorsk. Leaving his young wife there, the artist spent a month painting studies in Svaneti. The Caucasian landscapes he created at that time sparked great public interest. For most residents of central Russia, the North Caucasus was an unexplored region. Thus, when Yaroshenko brought his painting Shat-Gora (Elbrus) (1884) to Saint Petersburg, many considered the depicted panorama of the Caucasus Range to be a product of the artist's imagination. Thanks to the critic Vladimir Stasov, Yaroshenko earned the nickname "portraitist of mountains."

In 1885, Yaroshenko purchased a house in Kislovodsk, named the "White Villa," where the family spent their summers. Numerous friends—writers, artists, scientists, and frequent guests of the "Yaroshenko Saturdays" in Saint Petersburg—visited them, including Sergei Rachmaninoff, Fyodor Chaliapin, Leonid Sobinov, Konstantin Stanislavsky, Gleb Uspensky, Ivan Pavlov, Dmitri Mendeleev, Vladimir and Anna Chertkov, and actress Polina Strepetova.

Artists such as Repin, Nesterov, Ge, Dubovskoy, Kasatkin, and Kuindzhi also visited their colleague.

Lev Tolstoy planned to seek refuge at Yaroshenko's home during his first planned escape from Yasnaya Polyana.

The hospitable hosts added several outbuildings to their five-room house, and their guests helped decorate them with frescoes in the style of Pompeii. Yaroshenko lived and worked at the "White Villa" for the rest of his life.

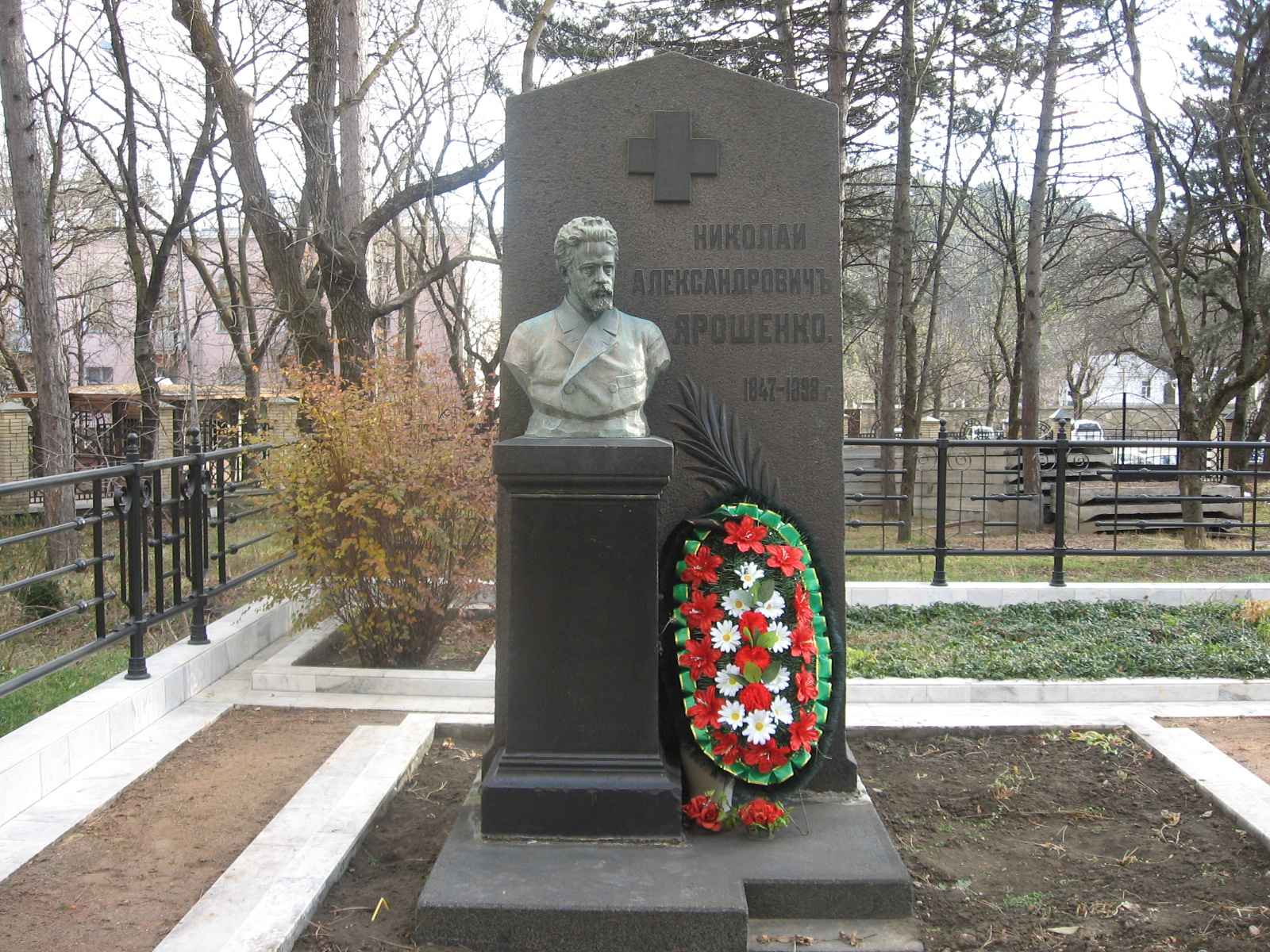
Grave of N. A. Yaroshenko near the fence of Saint Nicholas Cathedral, Kislovodsk.

In 1892, fulfilling his father's dream and following in his footsteps, Nikolai Yaroshenko retired with the rank of Major General.

In 1897, despite suffering from tuberculosis of the trachea, Yaroshenko embarked on a journey across Russia and abroad: Volga Region, Italy, Syria, Palestine, and Egypt. He returned with numerous paintings, sketches, studies, portraits, and graphic works. In June 1898, he stayed at the Oleiz Estate with the merchant-patron I. F. Tokmakov in Koreiz, Crimea.

Yaroshenko died in Kislovodsk on June 26, 1898 from a heart attack, the day after running over 10 km from Bolshoye Sedlo mountain, where he had been painting en plein air, to his home in the rain. He was buried in Kislovodsk near the Saint Nicholas Cathedral (the cathedral was destroyed during Soviet times and later rebuilt with completely altered proportions). A year later, a monument was erected at his grave — a bronze bust of the artist on a black pedestal, set against a granite stele with a relief depicting a cross, a palm branch, and a palette with brushes. The design of the tombstone was developed with contributions from artists Nikolai Dubovskoy and Pavel Bryullov. The sculptural portrait was created by Yaroshenko's friend, the Peredvizhniki sculptor Leonid Pozen.

== Family ==
His father — Alexander Mikhailovich Yaroshenko (1807-1876), was a major general.

Mother — Lyubov Vasilyevna (Mishchenko) (1822-1890).

Brother — Vasily Alexandrovich (1848-after 1915) — chemical engineer, was married to Elizabeth Platonovna (Stepanova, in the first marriage Schlitter).

Sisters: Sofia Alexandrovna (1852-1923) — mother of Boris Savinkov; Vera Alexandrovna (married Kupchinskaya), Nadezhda Alexandrovna, Lyubov Alexandrovna.

Spouse (since 1874) — Maria Pavlovna Nevrotina (? - September 14, 1915).

== Artistic work ==
Portraits occupy a significant place in Yaroshenko's oeuvre; he created around one hundred of them. The artist was drawn to individuals engaged in intellectual pursuits: writers, scientists, artists, and actors. As a student of Kramskoi, he saw the primary task of a portraitist as understanding the psychology of the subject. His wife remarked on this: "He could not paint faces that held no spiritual interest".

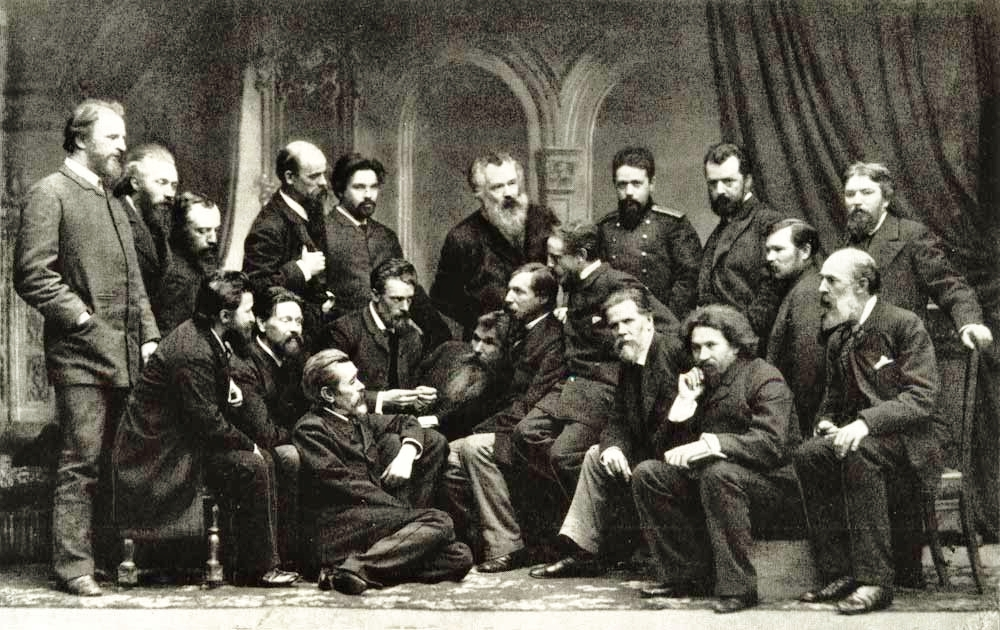
The Peredvizhniki in 1885. N. Yaroshenko is standing third from the right in a captain's military uniform.

The subject matter of Yaroshenko's genre paintings primarily revolved around themes of civic sorrow. His most famous works include The Stoker, The Prisoner, Life is Everywhere, Student, Sister of Mercy (all five housed in the Tretyakov Gallery in Moscow), Kursistka (with Anna Dieterichs as the prototype), Old and Young, Reasons Unknown, Nevsky Prospect at Night, and The Forgotten Temple.

The subject of the painting At the Lithuanian Castle (1881, not preserved) was linked to Vera Zasulich's assassination attempt on the Saint Petersburg city governor F. F. Trepov. The government banned the display of this painting at the Peredvizhniki Exhibition, which opened on the day of Alexander II's assassination, March 1, 1881. Yaroshenko was placed under house arrest, and the Minister of Internal Affairs, Mikhail Tarielovich Loris-Melikov, visited him for a "conversation." The painting was never returned to the artist. Based on surviving sketches and preparatory materials, he created the painting The Terrorist. This work is now housed in the Yaroshenko Museum-Estate in Kislovodsk.

Yaroshenko's portraiture demonstrates his ability to convey the character of his subjects. His finest works in this genre include portraits of actress P. A. Strepetova (in the Tretyakov Gallery), chemist Dmitri Mendeleev (watercolor, also in the Tretyakov Gallery), philosopher Vladimir Solovyov, lawyers A. M. Unkovsky and V. D. Spasovich, writer Gleb Uspensky, poet A. N. Pleshcheyev, and historian K. D. Kavelin.

In addition to genre paintings and portraits, Yaroshenko created landscapes dedicated to the nature of Poltavshchyna, the Middle East, and the Caucasus. Several of his landscape paintings and studies are housed in the Tretyakov Gallery.

Yaroshenko was a staunch advocate for holding Peredvizhniki exhibitions in provincial cities. These exhibitions became major public events. The 15th Peredvizhniki Exhibition toured 14 cities. Exhibitions held after Yaroshenko's death, when his friend Dubovskoy led the Association, were also met with enthusiasm. On January 28, 1899, the 24th Association of Traveling Art Exhibitions was held in Smolensk at the Noble Assembly Halls. Under the influence of I. E. Repin, the renowned patron M. K. Tenisheva, owner of Talashkino, participated in its organization. The exhibition featured 180 realist paintings by artists such as A. M. Vasnetsov, N. A. Kasatkin, I. I. Levitan, V. E. Makovsky, V. D. Polenov, I. E. Repin, I. I. Shishkin, and others, including Smolensk native N. P. Bogdanov-Belsky. The exhibition closed on February 3, having attracted thousands of Smolensk residents. On February 12, the exhibition opened at the Noble Assembly Hall in Kaluga. Yaroshenko's painting Crater of Vesuvius, displayed there, is now held in the collections of the Kaluga Regional Art Museum.

The effective dissolution of the Association of Traveling Art Exhibitions was a severe blow to Yaroshenko. Repin, Kuindzhi, and others returned to the reformed Academy of Arts, arguing that it offered opportunities to teach realistic art to students. "The walls aren't to blame!" Repin justified. "It's not about the walls," Yaroshenko retorted, "but about betraying the ideals of the Association!" In his anger, Yaroshenko painted Judas based on a photograph of his once dearly beloved A. I. Kuindzhi.

== Gallery ==
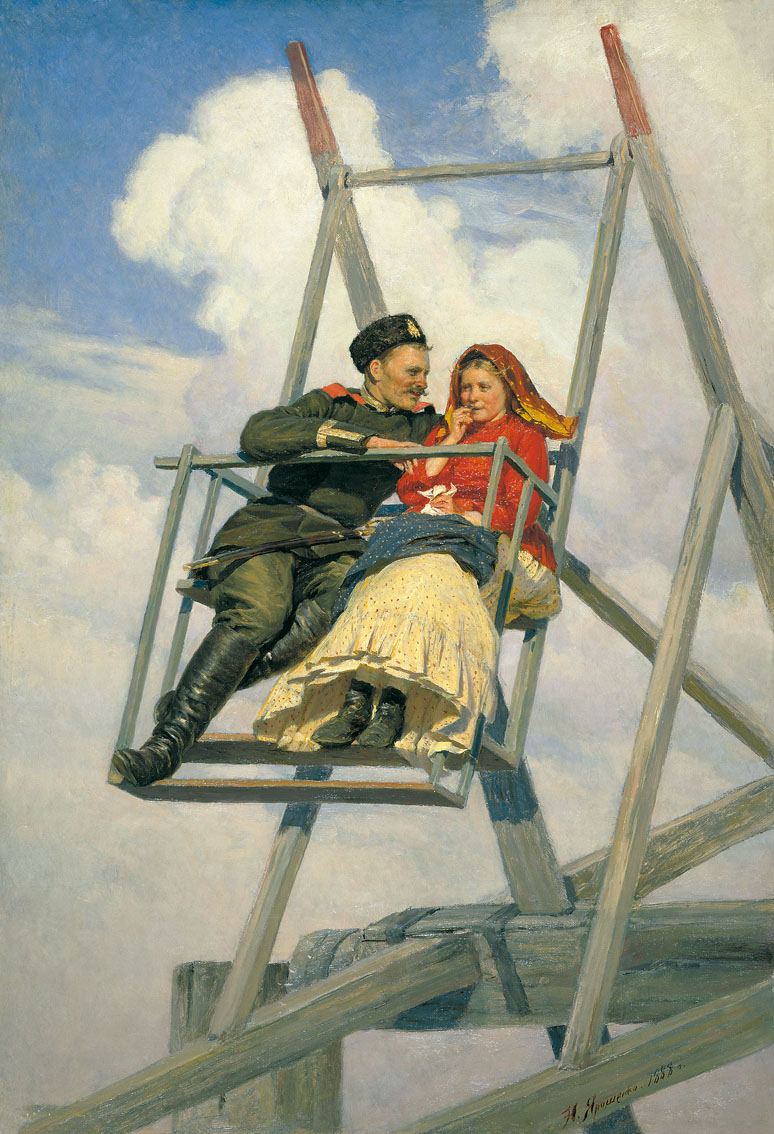
On the Swing (1888)

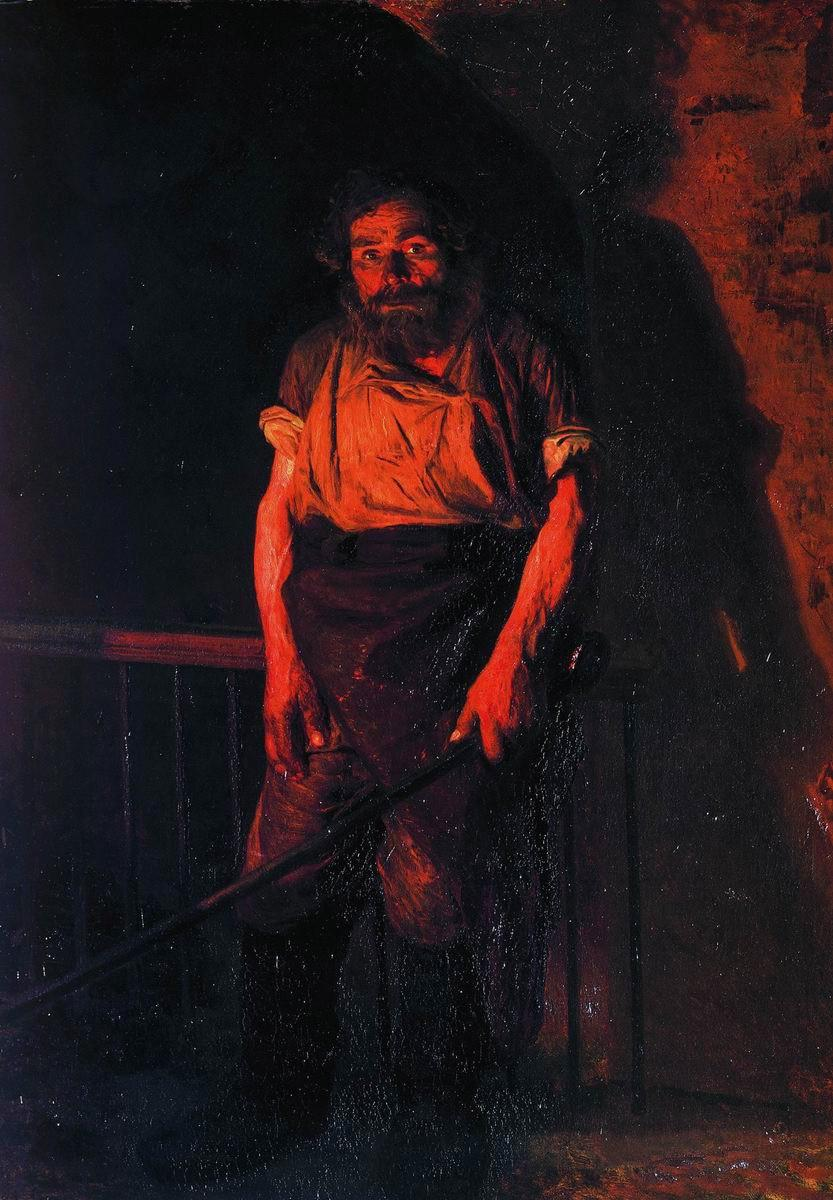
The Stoker, 1878.

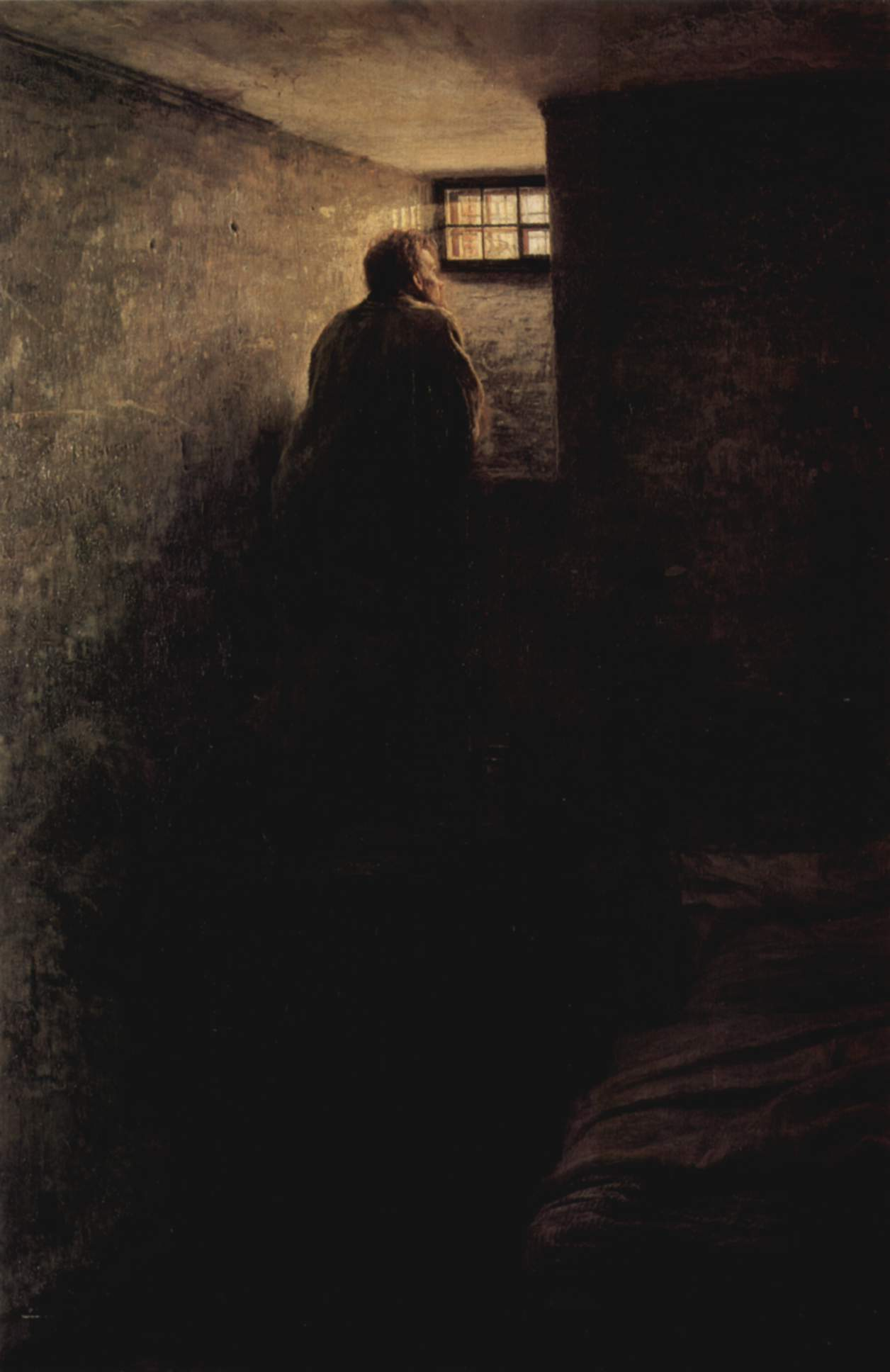
The Prisoner, 1878.

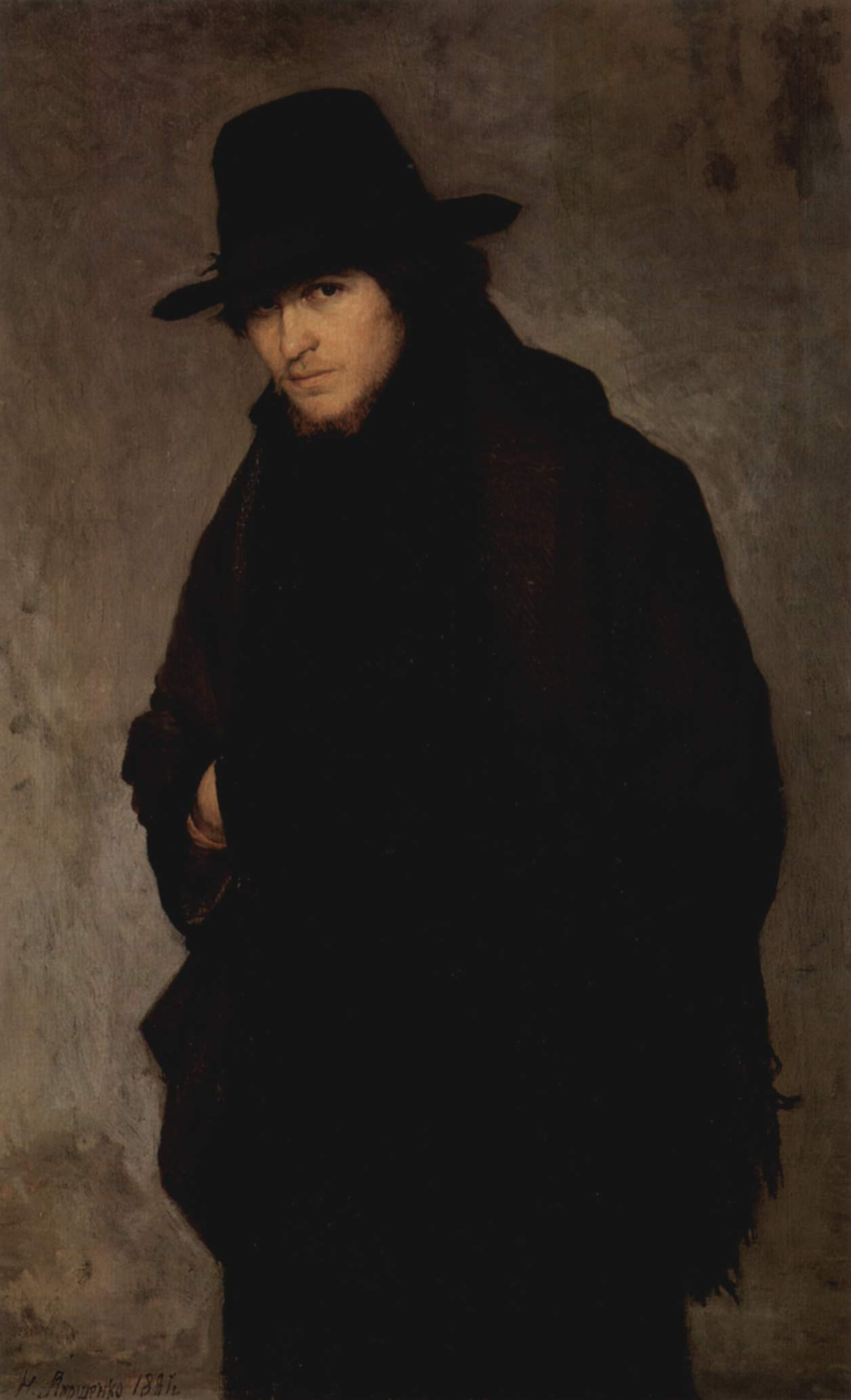
The Student, 1881.

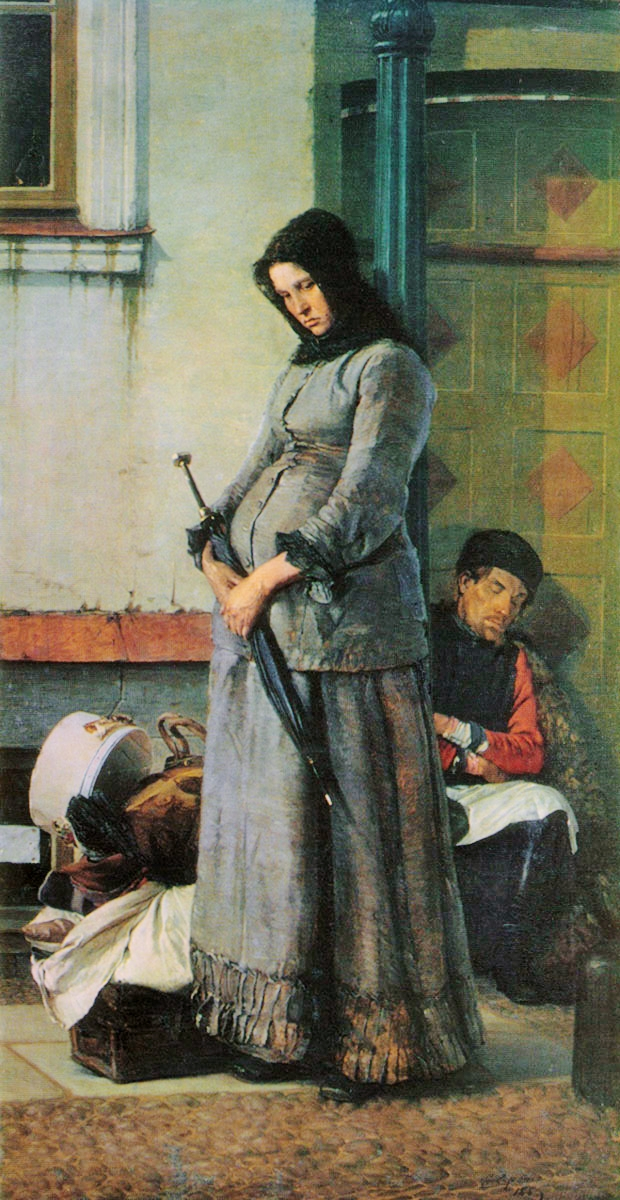
Kicked out, 1883

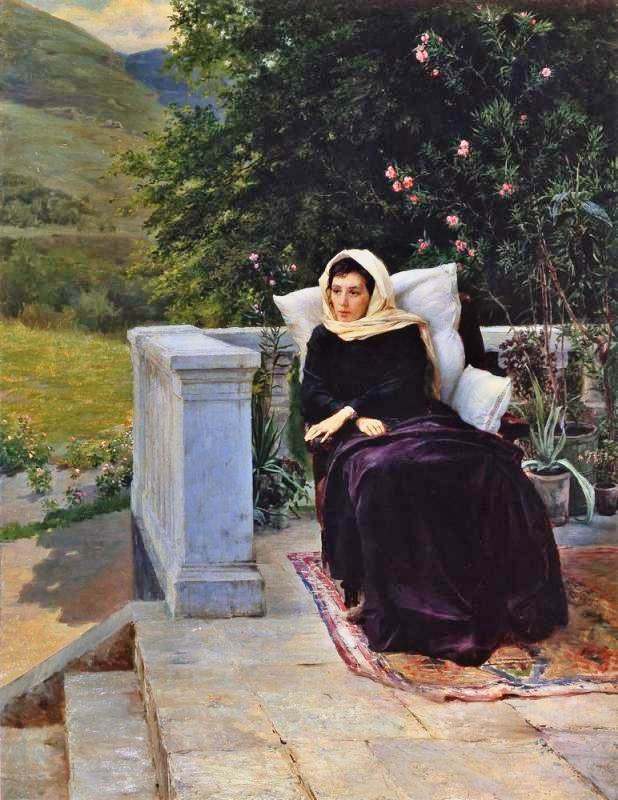
In a Warm Land (Portrait of Anna Chertkova), 1890.

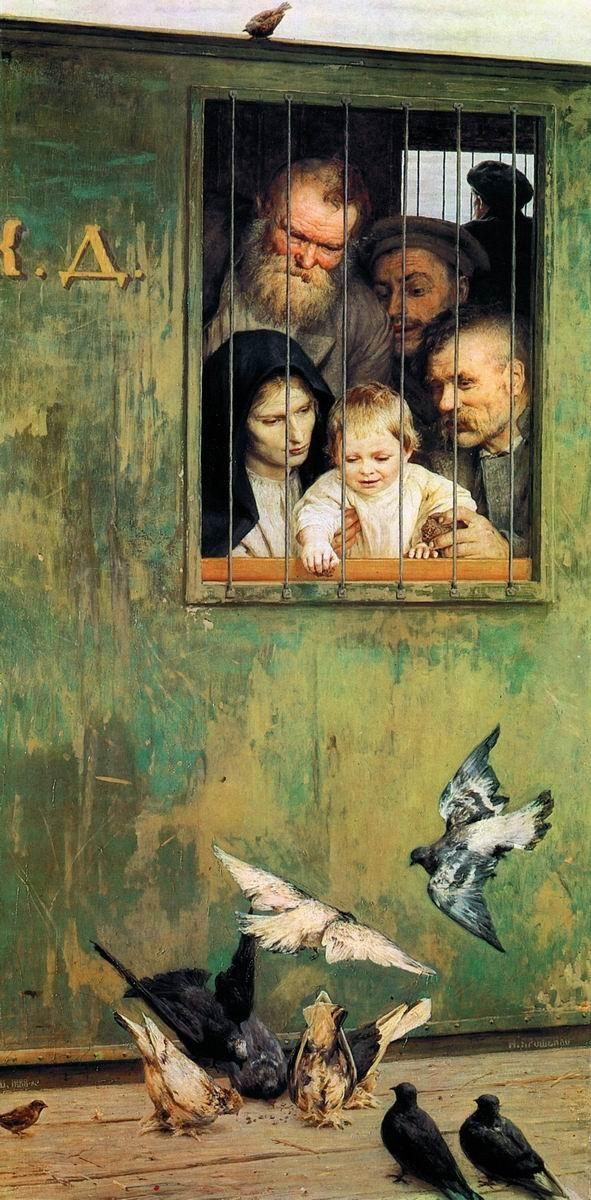
Life Is Everywhere, 1888.

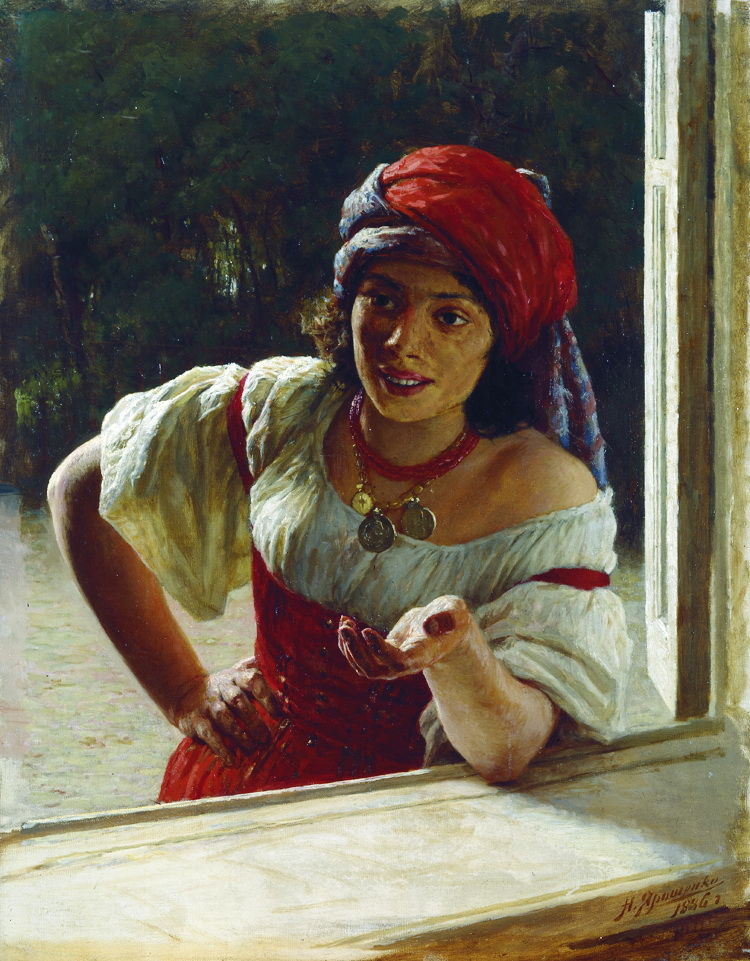
Gypsy Woman (1886) Oil on Canvas.

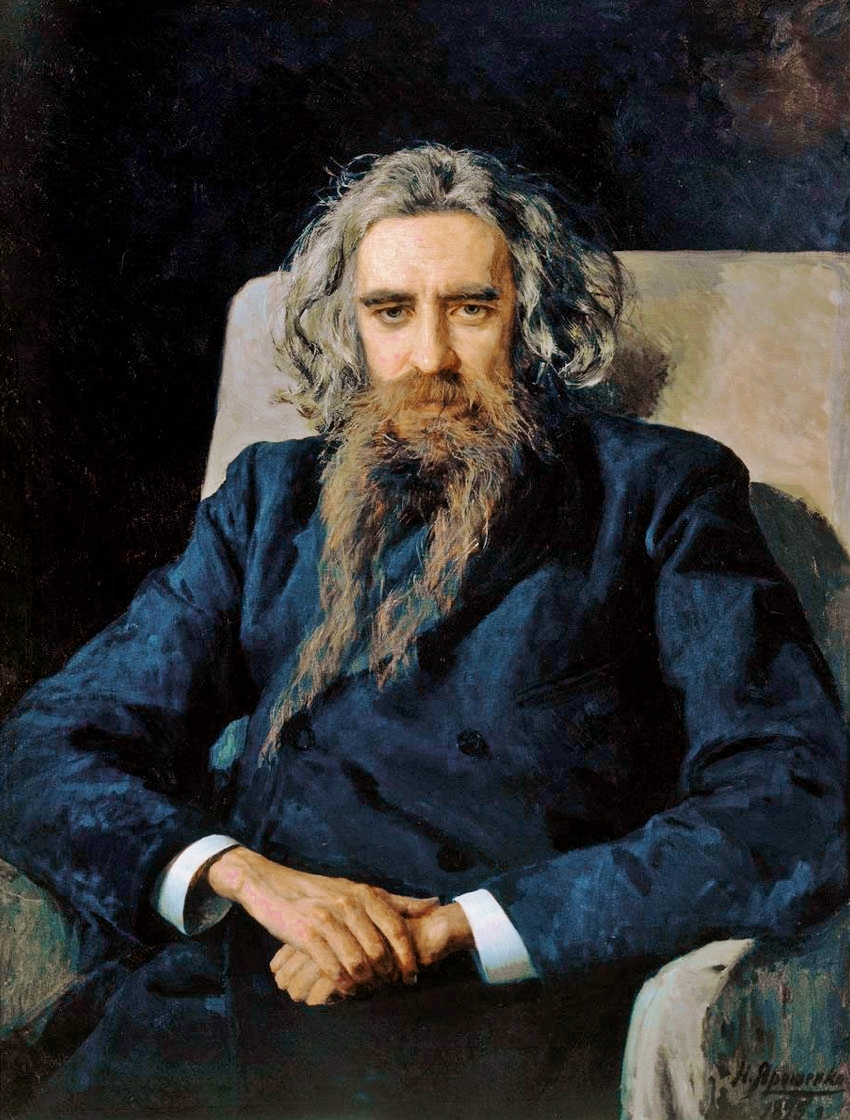
Portrait of Vladimir Solovyov, 1892.

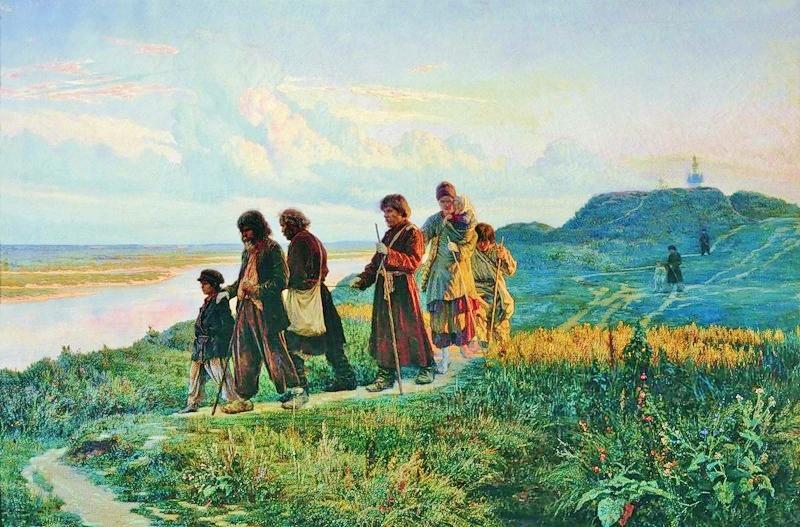
The Blind or Group of Blind People (1879).

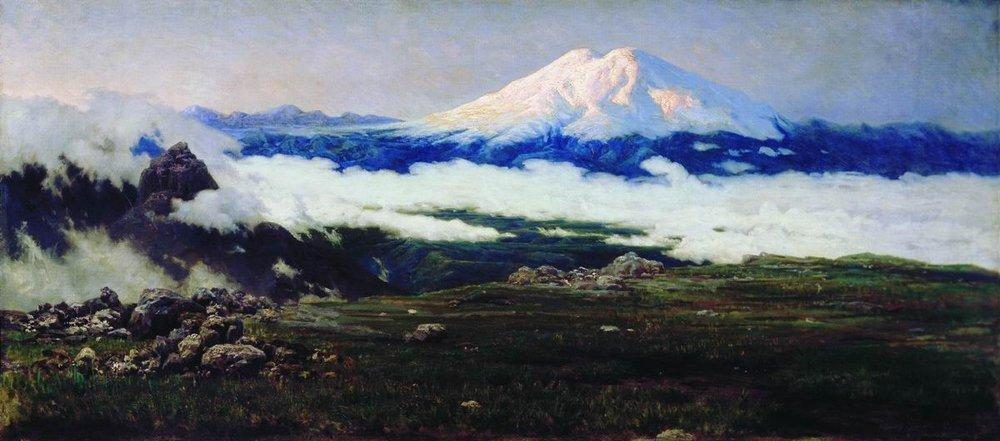
El Brus (1884), Caucasus Mountains.

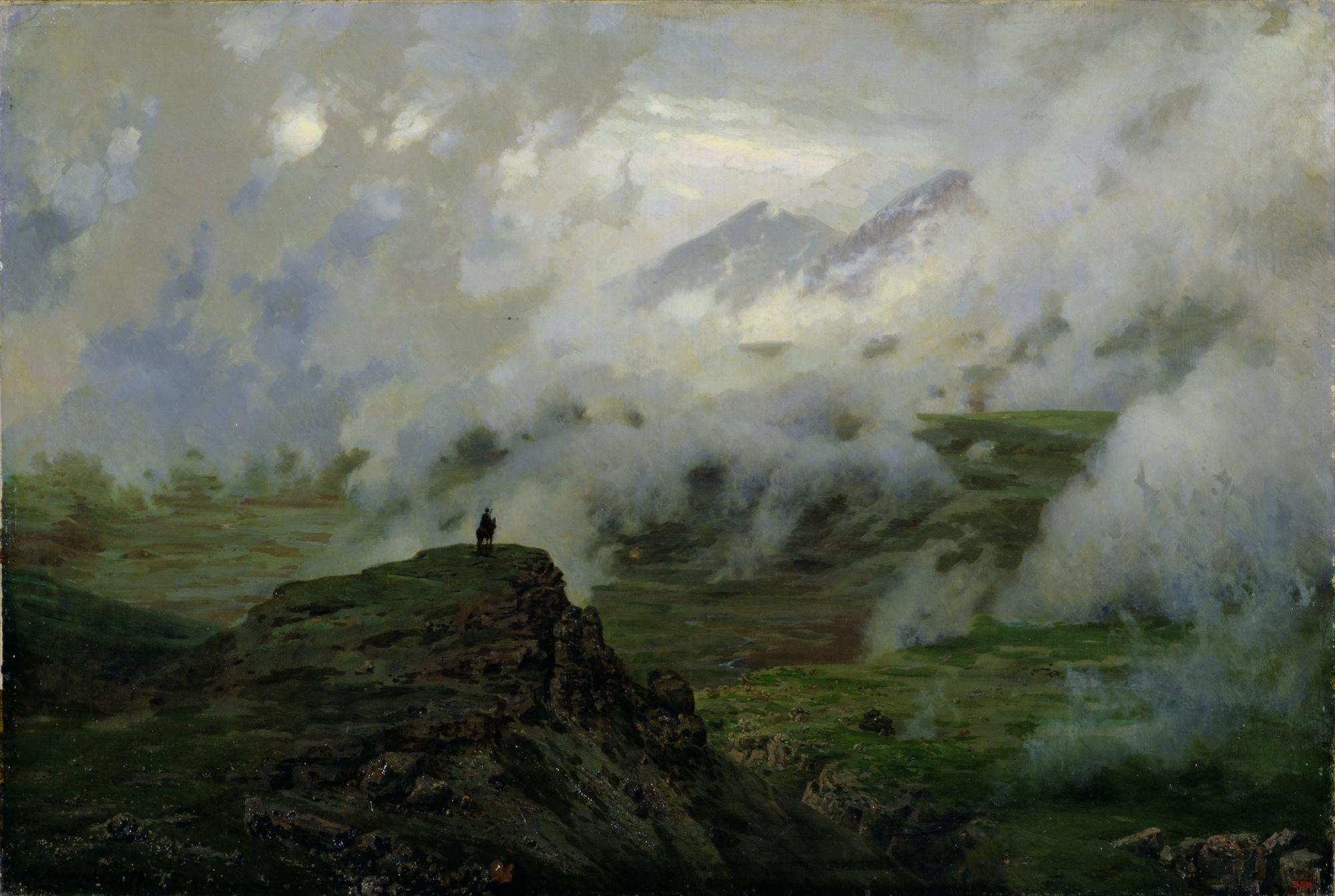
El Brus behind the Clouds (1894).

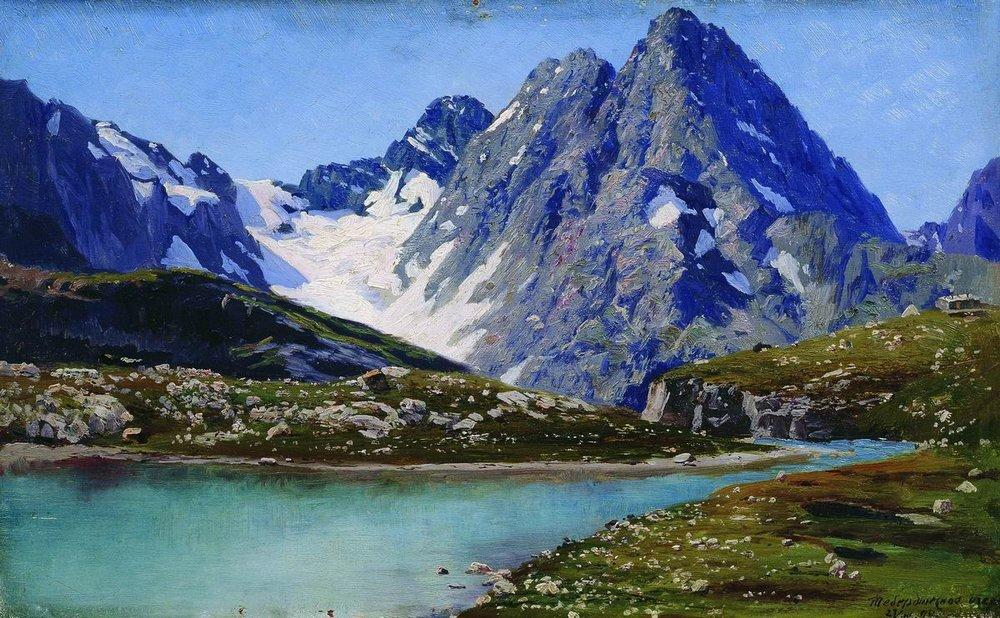
Lake Teberdinsky, Caucasus (1894).

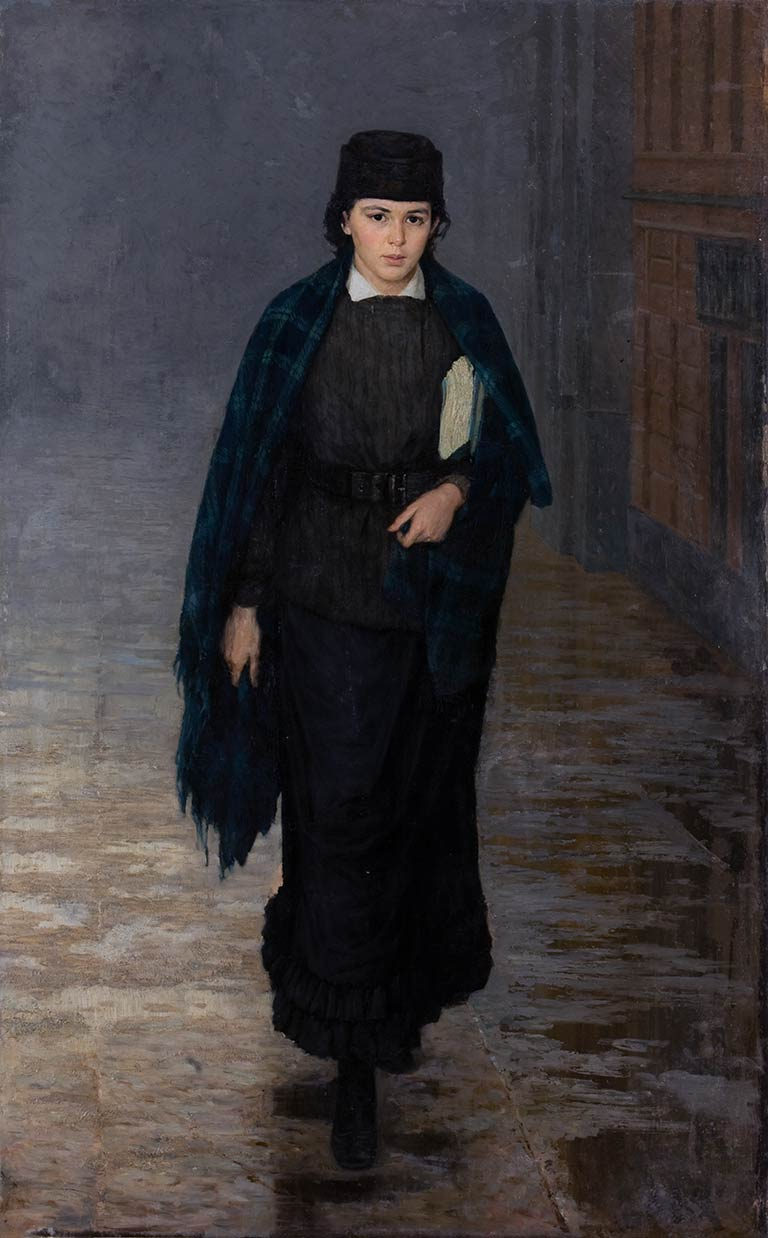
The Student girl (1883)

== Addresses and Museums ==
In Saint Petersburg:

- Summer 1874 – dacha of Ivan Kramskoi in Siverskaya;
- 1874–1879 – tenement house of A. I. and I. I. Kabatov on Basseynaya (modern address: Nekrasova Street, 27);
- 1879 – Spring 1898 – tenement house of the Schreibers, Sergievskaya Street, 63.

But it was not only Yaroshenko’s Kislovodsk house that was always full of guests, but also his Saint Petersburg apartment on Sergievskaya Street. Mikhail Nesterov, who knew the artist’s family well, recalled that there were often up to fifty “visitors” there. Some of them stayed for a long time, and then the apartment would descend into chaos, making it impossible to work. However, according to those close to him, this amused Nikolai Alexandrovich more than it upset him.

In Kislovodsk:

His own house (from November 16, 1885). Here, the artist created the painting In Warm Lands, which is part of the collection of the Russian Museum.

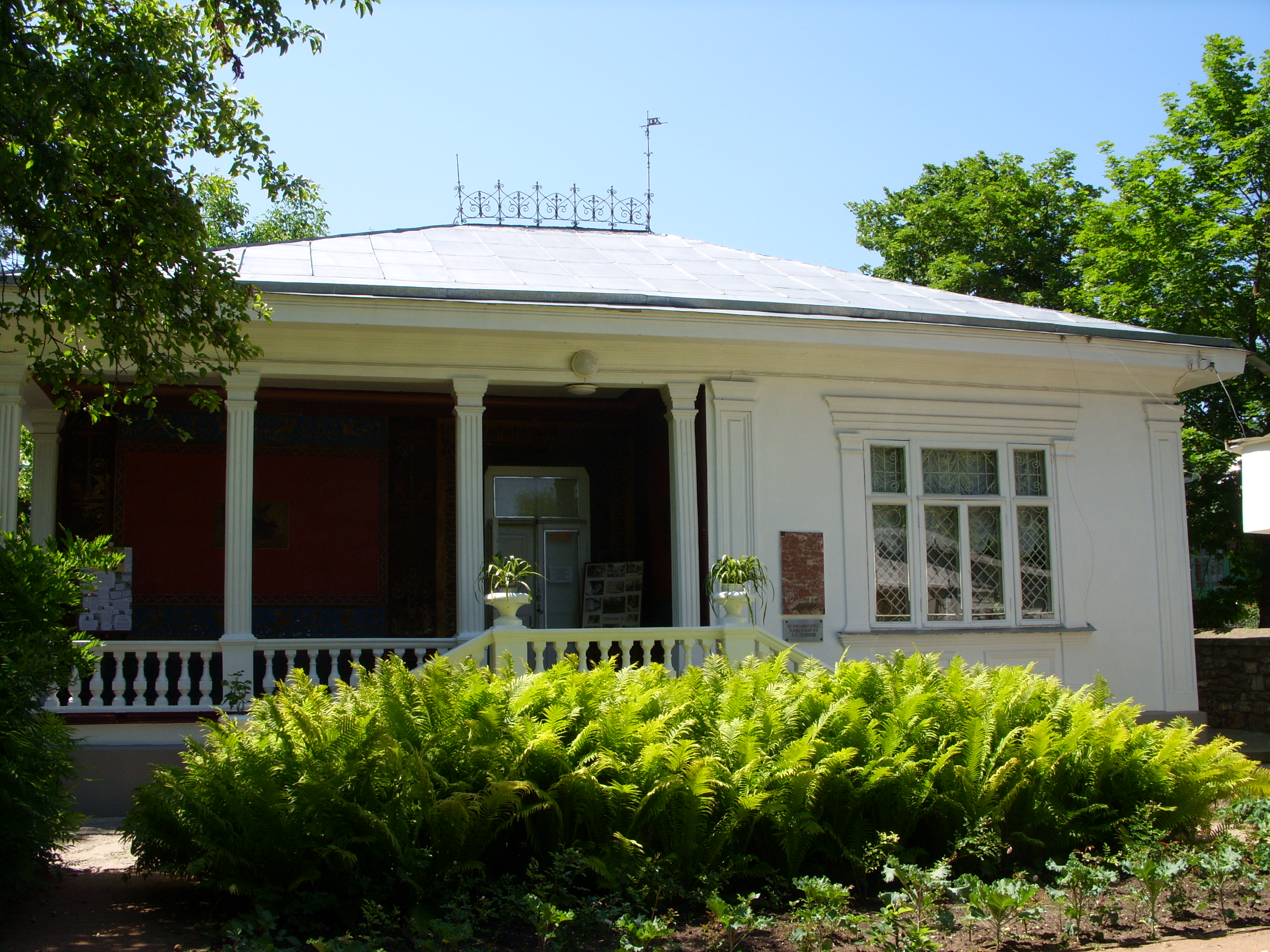
Yaroshenko Memorial Museum-Estate, Kislovodsk. Unofficially known as the “White Villa”.

According to the memoirs of M. V. Fofanova, V. I. Lenin greatly admired Yaroshenko’s paintings. By Lenin’s order, as early as December 1918, a memorial museum was established in Kislovodsk at Yaroshenko’s house, and the street on which the house stood (previously Dondukovskaya) was renamed Yaroshenko Street.

However, due to the Russian Civil War and subsequent devastation, the museum was closed and only reopened on March 11, 1962, thanks to the efforts of artist Vladimir Seklyutsky. The museum encompasses the entire estate, and through the efforts of museum staff, local residents, and sponsors, the buildings have been restored, and an extensive collection has been assembled. The museum holds 108 works of painting and graphics by Yaroshenko and 170 works by Peredvizhniki artists. Up to 20,000 people visit the museum annually.

In Kaluga Governorate:

The estate of the wife of his brother Vasily Alexandrovich, Elizaveta Platonovna (née Stepanova), Pavlishchev Bor, where many paintings were created. Ten works are housed in the Kaluga Regional Art Museum. These include portraits of loved ones, the famous Portrait of a Lady with a Cat and The Student girl, as well as a portrait of an elderly woman – Yaroshenko’s nanny.

The painting by N. A. Yaroshenko On the Swing (1888) depicts a scene of a favorite folk pastime – on Whit Monday in the nearby village of Pavlishchevo.

The Yaroshenko estate Pavlishchev Bor is currently in a semi-ruined state, but the park and some buildings have been preserved, making restoration and museumification possible with adequate funding.

In Poltava:

The core collection of the Poltava Art Museum consists of a collection donated to his hometown by the Peredvizhniki artist N. A. Yaroshenko, which arrived in Poltava in 1917. It included 100 paintings and 23 working albums by the artist himself, as well as a significant number of works by his friends and colleagues from the Society for Itinerant Art Exhibitions.

== Critics ==
L. N. Tolstoy:

We all love Yaroshenko and, of course, would be very glad to see him.

Artist M. V. Nesterov:

His high nobility, his straightforwardness, and extraordinary steadfastness and faith in the cause he serves were, I think, an example not only for me, and the awareness that such an upright person exists among us encouraged us toward righteous deeds. Being impeccable himself, he insisted, passionately urged, and demanded that those who serve the same cause as he did stand at the same moral height and be as unwavering in their duty as he was.

D. I. Mendeleev, after Yaroshenko's death, wrote:

I would give a year of my life to have Yaroshenko sitting here now so I could talk with him!

== Memory ==
- In 1991 the asteroid (4437), discovered on April 10, 1983, was named after Yaroshenko.
- Honorary citizen of the city of Kislovodsk.

== See also ==
- In a Warm Land

== Bibliography ==
- Polenova, I. V. (1983). Yaroshenko v Peterburge [Yaroshenko in Petersburg]. Leningrad: Lenizdat.
- Porudominskiy, V. I. (1979). Nikolay Yaroshenko [Nikolai Yaroshenko]. Zhizn v iskusstve. Moskva: Iskusstvo. p. 197.
- Prytkov, V. A. (1960). N. A. Yaroshenko [N. A. Yaroshenko]. Moskva: (Unknown).
- Tovarishchestvo peredvizhnykh khudozhestvennykh vystavok. Pisma, dokumenty. 1869–1899 [The Association of Traveling Art Exhibitions. Letters, Documents. 1869–1899]. Vol. 2. Moskva: Iskusstvo. 1987.
- Seklyutsky, V. V. (1963). Nikolay Aleksandrovich Yaroshenko [Nikolai Alexandrovich Yaroshenko]. Includes: Trusova Natalya Nikolaevna (urozhdyonnaya Kupchinskaya). Vospominaniya (Memoirs). pp. 103–105. Stavropol: .
- Vereshchagina, A. G. (1967). Nikolay Aleksandrovich Yaroshenko [Nikolai Alexandrovich Yaroshenko]. Narodnaya biblioteka po iskusstvu. Leningrad: Khudozhnik RSFSR.
