= Ya. M. Sverdlova State Owned Enterprise =

Russian manufacturing and defence company

Plant named after Ya.M. Sverdlov
- Industry: Chemical
- Founded: 27 June 1916
- Headquarters: Dzerzhinsk, Russia
- Website: www.sverdlova.ru

Ya. M. Sverdlov State Owned Enterprise (Russian: Завод имени Я.М. Свердлова) is one of the Russian Federation's strategic manufacturers within its Russian Military Industrial Complex. The plant was founded on 27 June 1916 in the town of Dzerzhinsk (around 30 km from the city of Nizhny Novgorod and 400 km from Moscow).

It is one of the largest Russian manufacturers of industrial explosives, detonators for the oil and gas industry, seismic and geophysical works. The Sverdlov plant employs 5,000 people.

The plant's output was divided into the following:

- Defense applications (30%)
- Explosive products (30%)
- Industrial chemicals (35%)
- Machinery (5%)

Of the aforementioned, Ya. M. Sverdlov Plant is Russia's only producer of HMX and RDX explosive products.

The current CEO of the chemical factory is Yuri F. Shumsky.

For 2024 Acting General Director - Nail Khalilovich Giniyatov.

== Structure ==
1100 hectares is the territory of the industrial site of the enterprise. There are thermal power plants, a water treatment system, 1,000 buildings and structures, 120 km of highways and 90 km of railway tracks. The car park consists of 200 pieces of equipment, and the railway rolling stock consists of 900 wagons. The company also has 3 vessels.

== Sanctions ==
On March 18, 2023, amid Russia's invasion of Ukraine, the plant was added to Ukraine’s sanctions list "for supporting actions that undermine or threaten the territorial integrity, sovereignty, and independence of Ukraine.”

On June 23, 2023, the plant was included in the European Union sanctions list for providing material support to and benefiting from the Government of Russia, which is responsible for the annexation of Crimea and the destabilization of Ukraine. Additionally, the plant manufactures explosives "used by the Russian Armed Forces during the illegal and unprovoked military invasion of Ukraine in 2022.”

On February 21, 2024, the plant was added to Canada’s sanctions list targeting organizations associated with the military-industrial complex.

For similar reasons, the plant is also under sanctions imposed by the United States, the United Kingdom, Japan, and Switzerland.

On 6 October 2025, the plant was set ablaze by Ukrainian drones. A manufacturer of industrial explosives, it had since started supplying military grade explosives for “aerial bombs, warheads for anti-tank cumulative guided missiles, and warheads for anti-aircraft missile systems”. The local governor confirmed fires, damaged property and one person who was injured.
