= Tecmash =

Russian state-owned defense manufacturer

- Company type: Joint-stock company
- Industry: Defense industry
- Founded: 2011
- Headquarters: Moscow, Russia
- Products: Ammunition, Artillery shells, Tank shells, Rockets, Missiles, Precision-guided munitions, Bombs, General-purpose bombs, Glide bombs, Grenade launchers, Rocket propelled grenade launchers (RPG), Rocket artillery, Multiple rocket launchers (MRL), UAVs
- Revenue: $1.29 billion (2016)
- Net income: $164 million (2016)
- Number of employees: 45,226 (2016)
- Parent: Rostec
- Website: tecmash.ru

Tecmash (Russian: Техмаш)—formal name Aktsionernoe Obshchestvo Nauchno-Proizvodstvenny Kontsern Tekhnologii Mashinostroeniya (Russian: Акционерное общество научно-производственный концерн технологии машиностроения)—is a 2010s-20s Russian arms industry company within the Rostec state corporation group producing and developing weapons, munitions, and ammunition for Armed Forces. Founded in 2011, the Tecmash consortium played an important role in manufacturing military equipment and supplies during the Russo-Ukrainian War.

== History ==
Tecmash was incorporated in April 2011 as part of a major Russian government reorganization of industry and assumption of ownership of the companies of the Russian Federation, with its headquarters in Moscow.

As of 2018, the company was manufacturing ammunition, artillery shells, tank shells, rockets, multiple rocket launchers (MRL), missiles, precision-guided munitions, general-purpose bombs, glide bombs, grenade launchers, rocket-propelled grenades (RPGs), and UAVs

== Subsidiaries ==
The structure of the holding company JSC "SPC" Tecmash at one time may have included as many as 48 organizations of the munitions industry and special chemicals, 47 of these companies belong to the military–industrial complex and at one time were included in the consolidated register of organizations of military-industrial complex of the Russian Federation. Many enterprises and research institutions that are included in the holding company, have a history that spans several decades. The entities of the holding company are located in 15 regions throughout the Russian Federation.

List of subsidiaries:

- State Research Institute Kristall
- Leningrad Mechanical Plant named after Karl Liebknecht
- The Tech Mash
- Research Institute of Engineering
- Research Institute Search
- Research Institute of Polymer Materials
- Research Institute of Machine Building
- Order of the Red Banner of Labor Special Research and Design Institute Soyuzprom NIIproekt
- Central Design Bureau of Polymer Materials with Pilot Production
- Cheboksary Production Association named after V. I. Chapaev
- Verkhneturinsky Machine Building Plant
- NPO Bazalt
- NPO Splav
- NPO Pribor
- Federal Research and Production Center Scientific Research Institute of Applied Chemistry
- Shtamp Machine-Building Plant
- Aleksinsky Experimental Mechanical Plant
- Biisk Production Association Sibpribormash
- Bryansk Chemical Plant named after the 50th anniversary of the USSR
- Plastics Plant
- Kalinin Plant
- Institute of Permgipromashprom
- Kalinovka Chemical Plant
- Kemerovo Mechanical Plant
- Red Army Research Institute of Mechanization
- Krasnozavodsky Chemical Plant
- Scientific Research Institute of Electronic Devices
- PI Snegirev Research Technological Institute
- Scientific and Production Association Device
- Delta Research and Production Enterprise
- Scientific-Production Enterprise Krasnoznamenets
- Nizhnelomovsky Electromechanical Plant
- Novo-Vyatka
- Novosibirsk Artificial Fiber Plant
- Novosibirsk Mechanical Plant Iskra
- OJSC Polymer
- Sergo Plant Production Association
- Mechanical Repair Plant Enisey
- Saratov Plant of Instrument Devices
- Smolensk Plant of Radio Components
- Solikamsk plant Ural
- Plant of Synthetic Fibers Elastic

== See also ==
- KB Tochmash
