= Promzona =

Art project by Pavel Otdelnov, 2015–2020

Promzona (2015—2020)
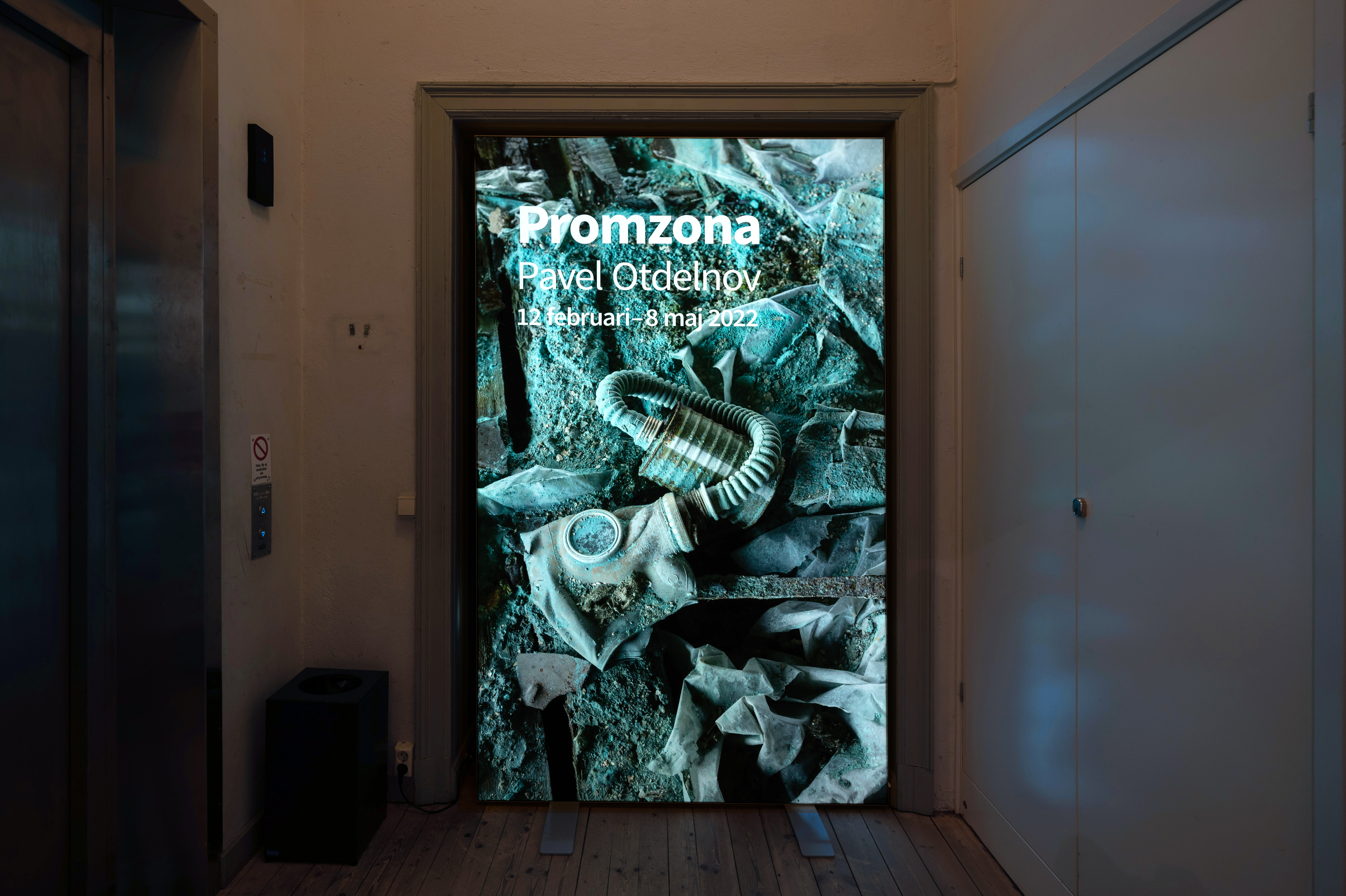
- Entrance hall of the exhibition Promzona at Uppsala Art Museum. 2022
- multimedia art project by Pavel Otdelnov exploring Dzerzhinsk's industrial legacy
- Location: Russia and Sweden
- Curator: Daria Kamyshnikova; Rebecka Wigh Abrahamsson
- Organiser: Pavel Otdelnov
- Website: www.promzona.site/en

Promzona (Industrial Zone) is a research-based multimedia art project by Russian artist Pavel Otdelnov, created between 2015 and 2020. It explores the history and environmental consequences of the chemical industry in Dzerzhinsk, Russia, through painting, photography, video, installation and archival research. The project combines personal and family history with the broader legacy of Soviet industrialisation and post-industrial transformation.

== Overview ==
=== Background and concept ===
Promzona examines the post-industrial landscape of the chemical plants in Dzerzhinsk, Nizhny Novgorod Oblast, one of the main centres of the Soviet chemical industry established in the late 1930s. During different historical periods, local factories served both military and civilian purposes. During the Second World War, some enterprises produced chemical warfare agents. In the post-war decades they manufactured products including fertilizers, herbicides, DDT insecticide, acrylic glass, caprolactam, acetone and other industrial chemicals. After privatization of the 1990s, many factories were declared unprofitable and closed, leaving behind a distinctive post-industrial landscape.

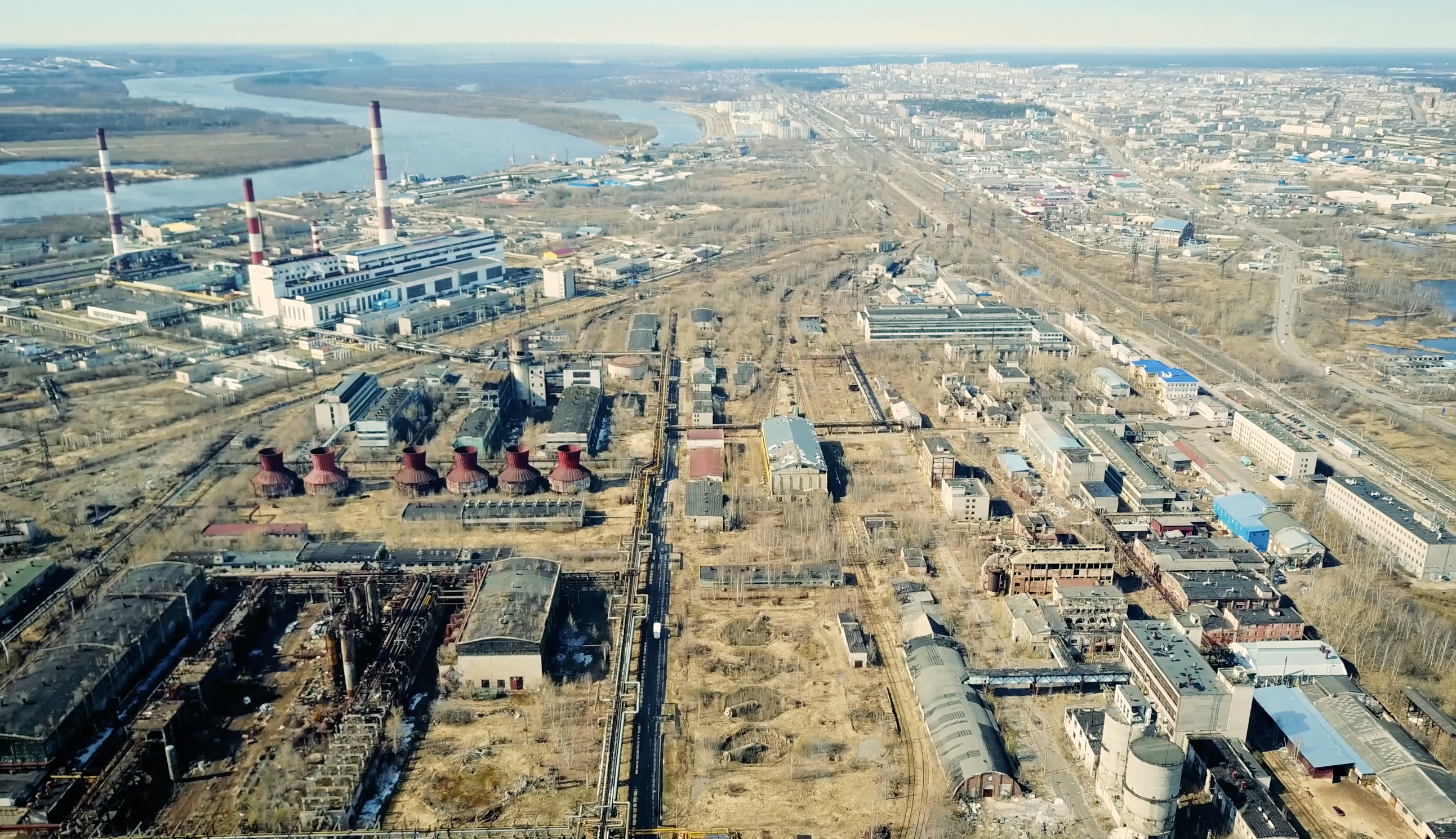
Eastern Industrial Zone of Dzerzhinsk, a still from the film Chemical Plant by Pavel Otdelnov. 2019

The project is based on the artist's family history: Dzerzhinsk is Otdelnov's home town, and three generations of his family worked at its chemical plants, from the construction of the industrial complex in the 1930s to hazardous industrial production and managerial positions during the late Soviet period. This personal connection became the basis for an artistic investigation of how individual memory intersects with the wider social and environmental consequences of Soviet industrial development.

A particular focus of the project is the Voroshilovsky workers' settlement in Dzerzhinsk's Eastern Industrial Zone, where the artist's grandparents lived. Because the settlement lay within the pollution zone of the surrounding chemical plants, its residents were resettled to safer districts and the settlement was removed from maps in the 1960s. Establishing its precise location became one of the starting points of the project.

=== Research and artistic method ===
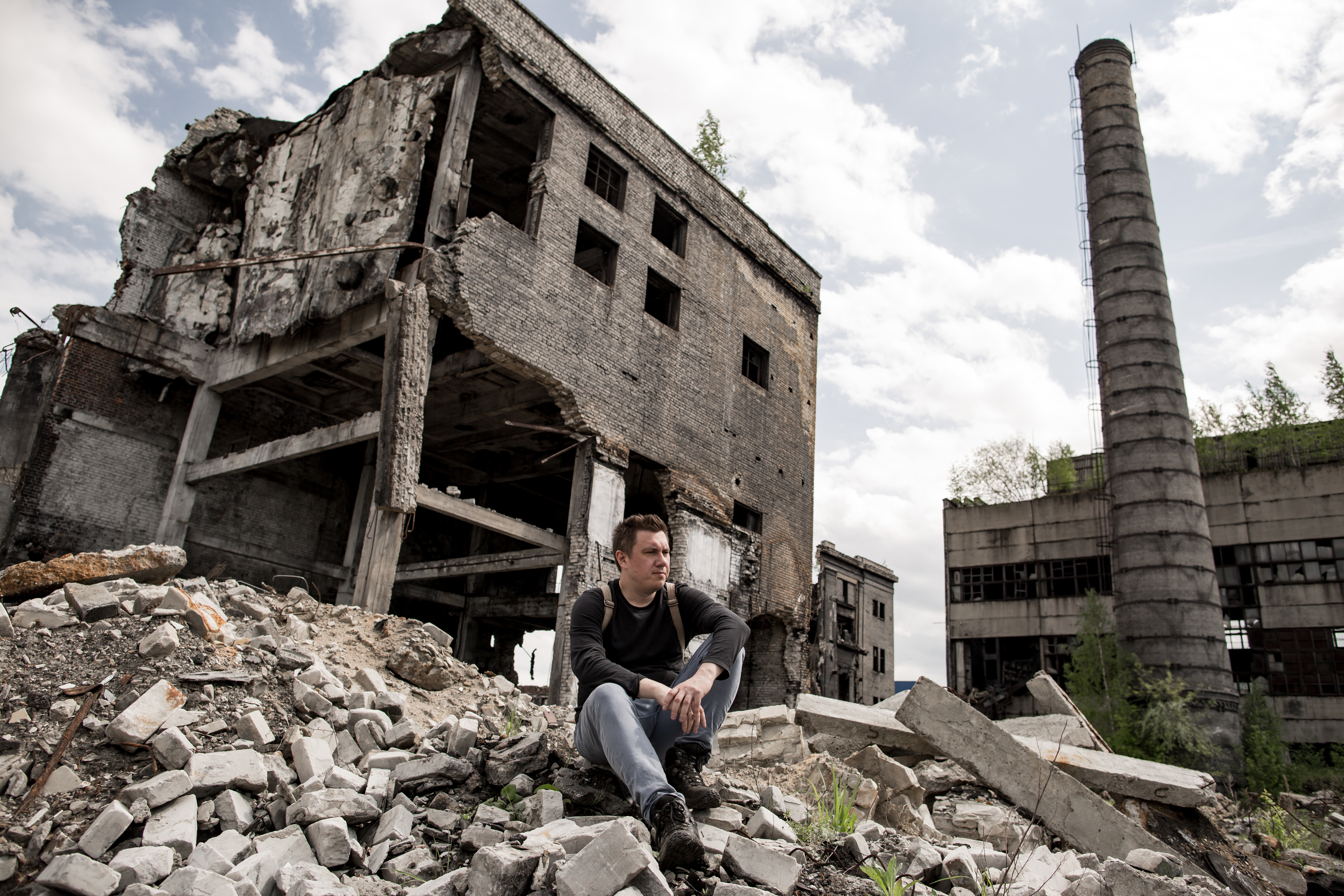
Pavel Otdelnov at a derelict industrial site in Dzerzhinsk. 2018

The project was developed through extensive archival and field research. Otdelnov examined archival records and Soviet-era local newspapers, collected oral histories, consulted local historians and environmental specialists, and conducted fieldwork in the industrial zones of Dzerzhinsk and the former Voroshilovsky settlement, working with historical maps and with aerial, drone and satellite imagery in order to locate sites that no longer appear on official maps. Combining painting, photography, video, installation, texts and found objects, Promzona explores the afterlife of Soviet industrialisation through historical, social and ecological perspectives.

=== Documentary film ===
In 2020, Welsh musician and filmmaker Geraint Rhys directed a short documentary film In the Footsteps of Ghosts about Pavel Otdelnov's Promzona. The film received an Honourable Mention at the New York Film Festival and won the Best Documentary award at the Moscow Shorts International Film Festival in January 2020.

== Project structure ==
The project is structured into six thematic sections: Museum, Traces, Wall of Fame, Ruins, Sand and Cinema. Together, they trace the history of Dzerzhinsk's chemical industry from its origins and official narratives to industrial decline and its environmental and social consequences.

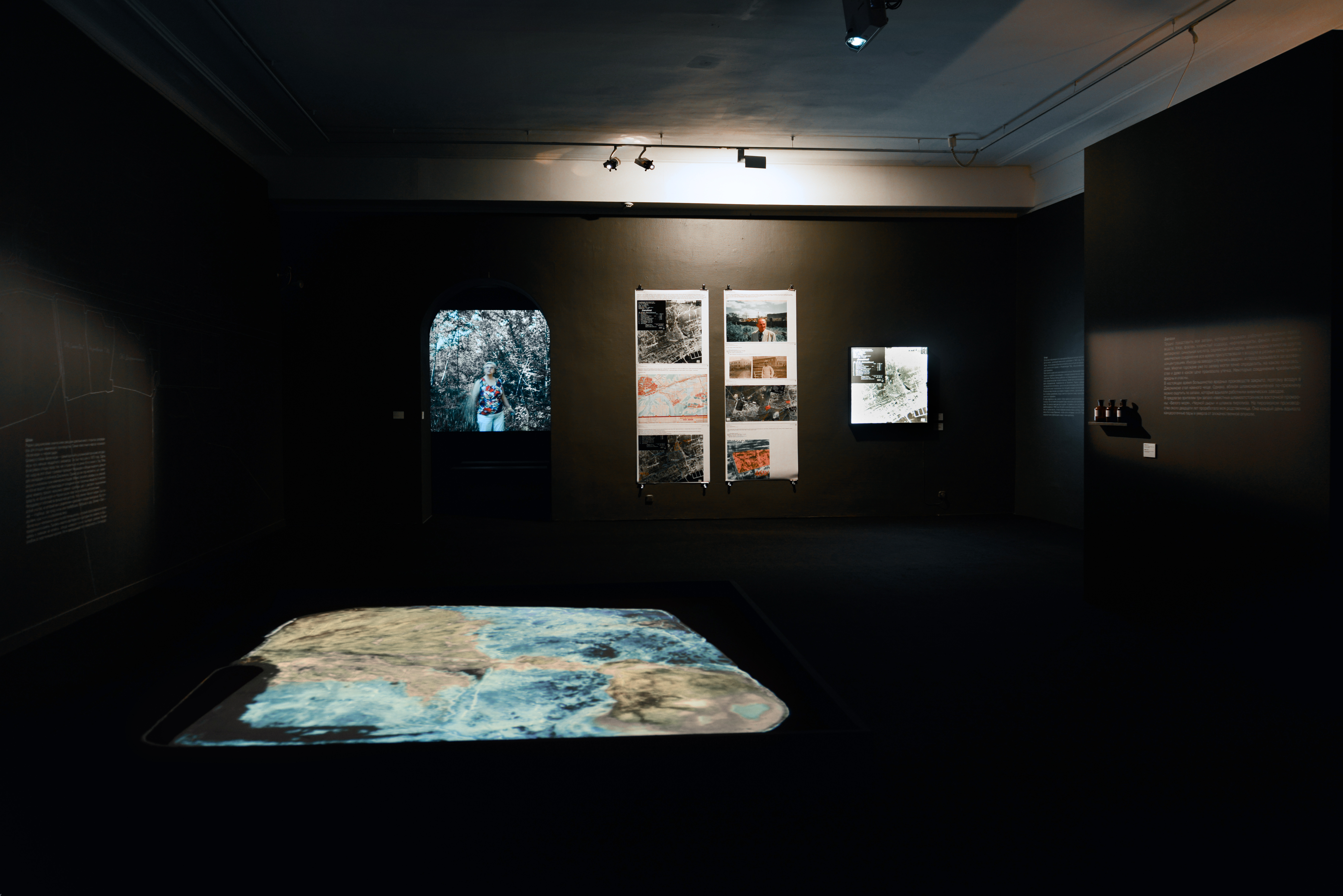
Museum section. Exhibition view. MMOMA. 2019

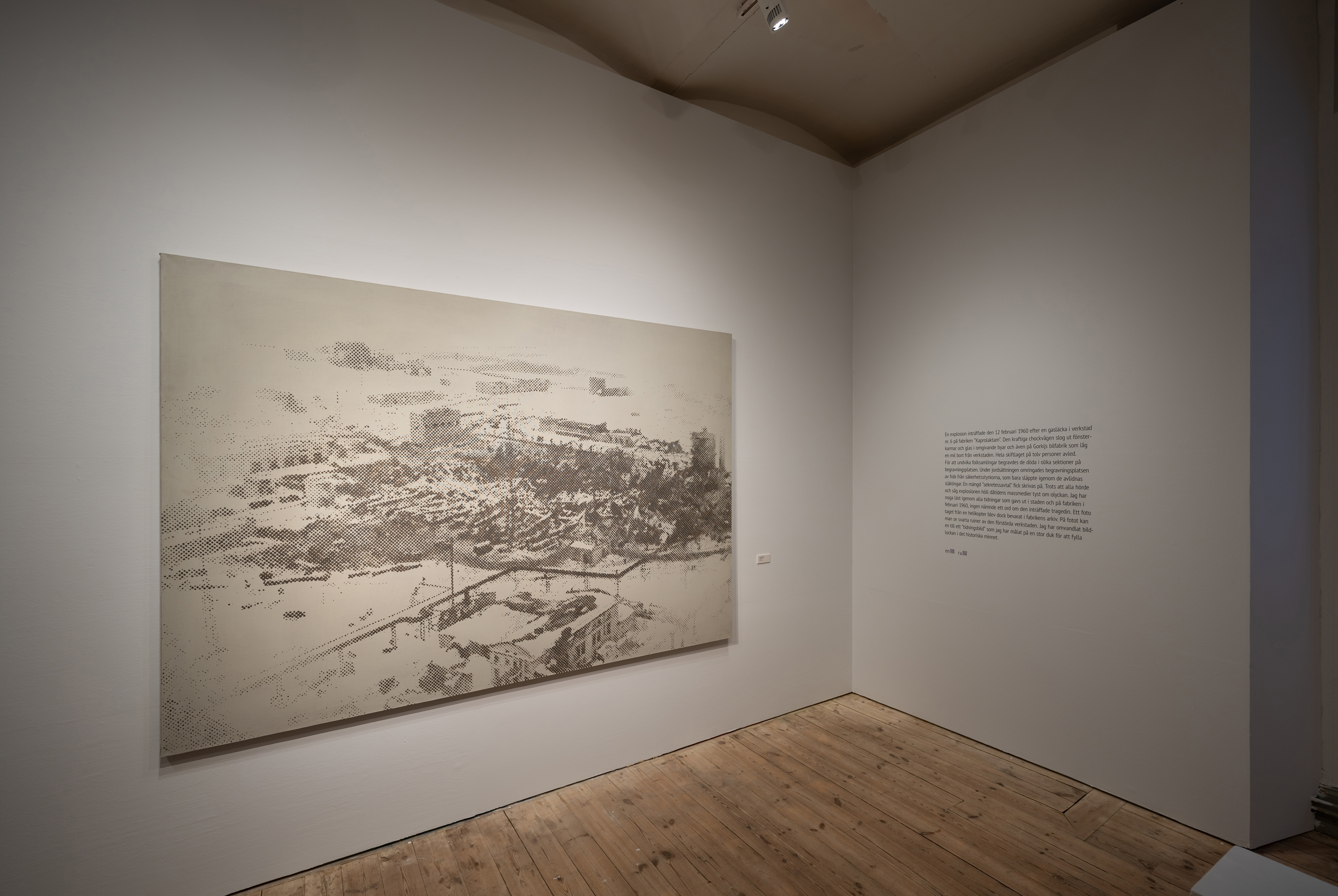
Traces section. Exhibition view. Uppsala art museum. 2019

Wall of Fame section. Exhibition view. MMOMA. 2019

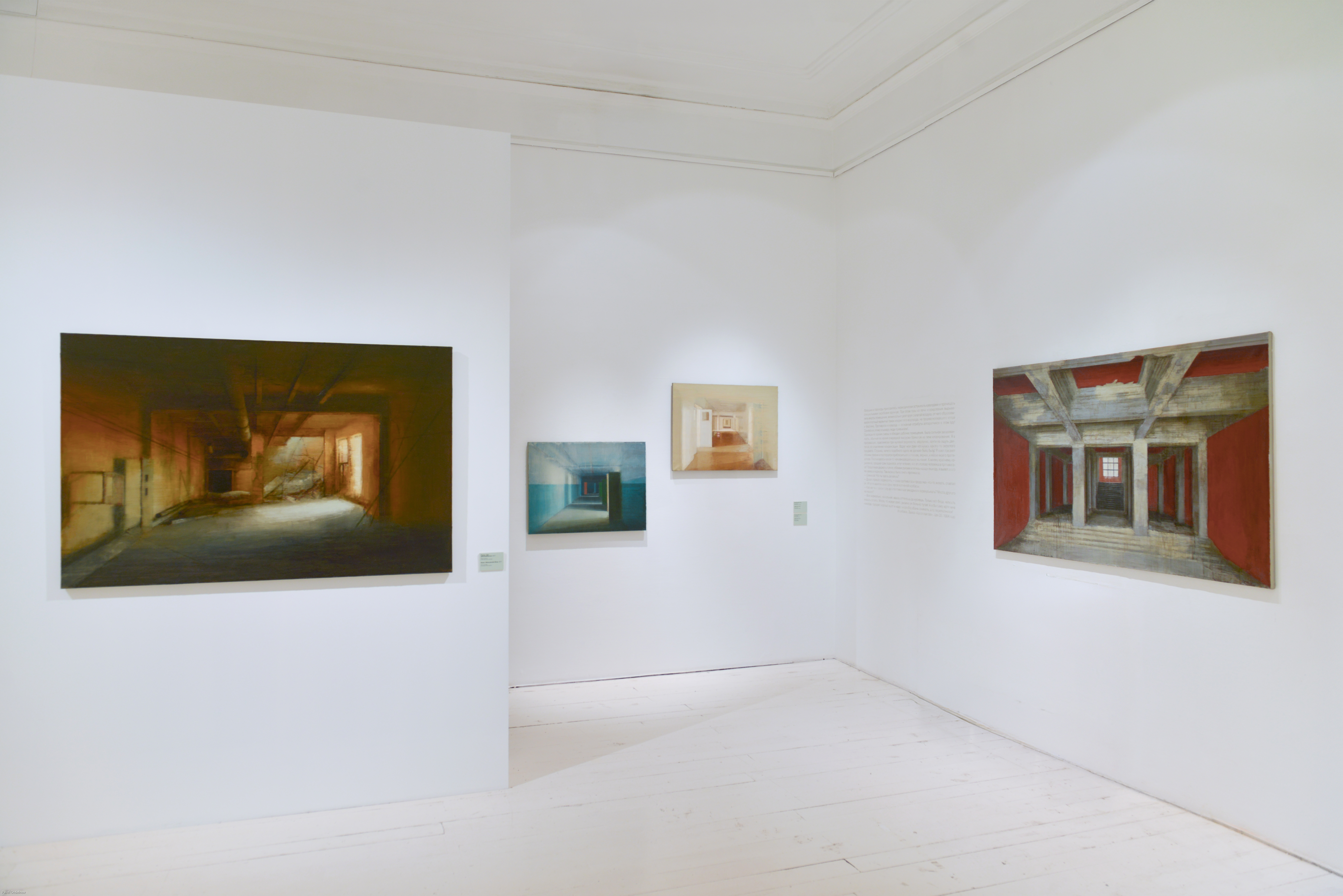
Ruins section. Exhibition view. MMOMA. 2019

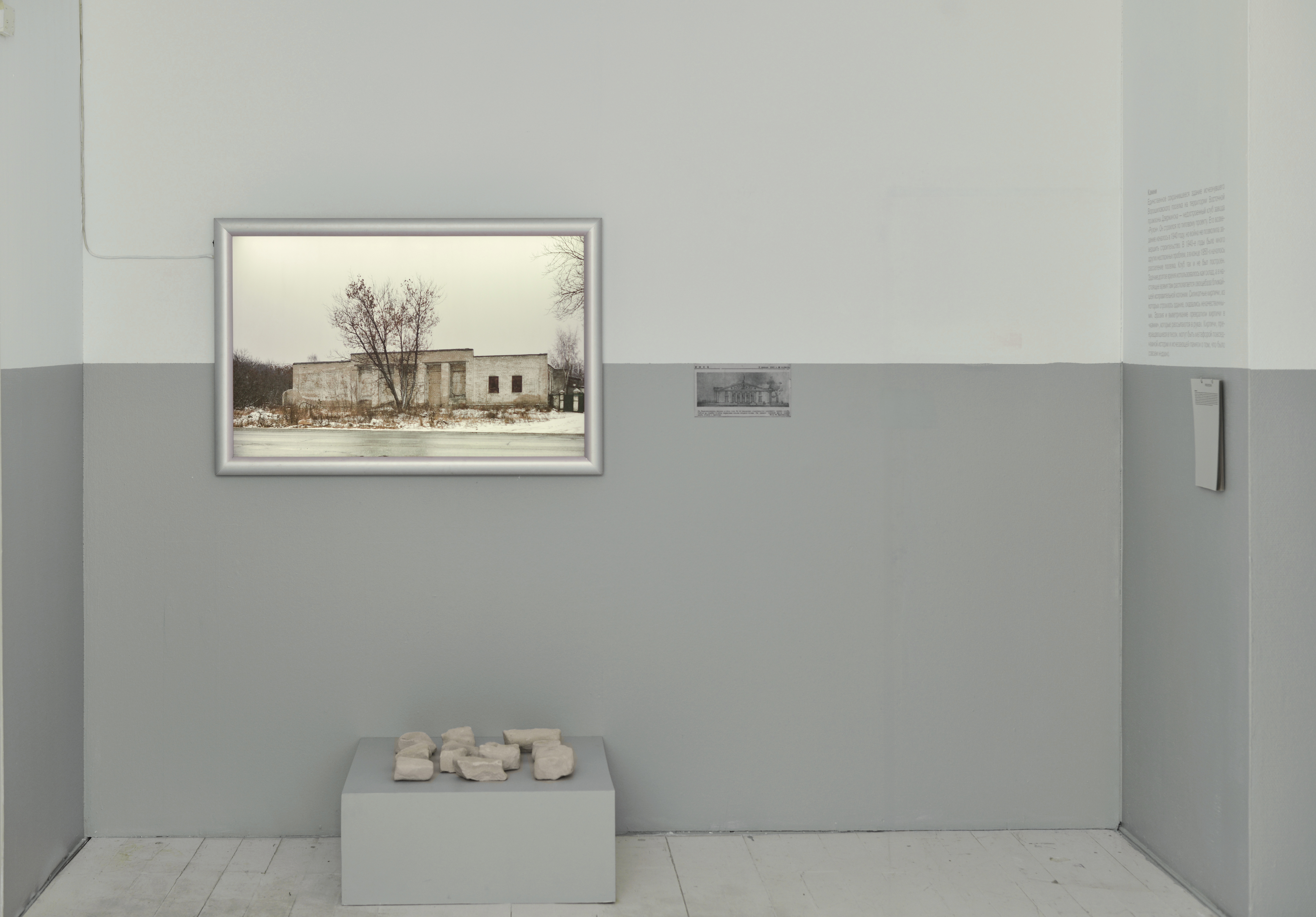
Sand section. Exhibition view. MMOMA. 2019

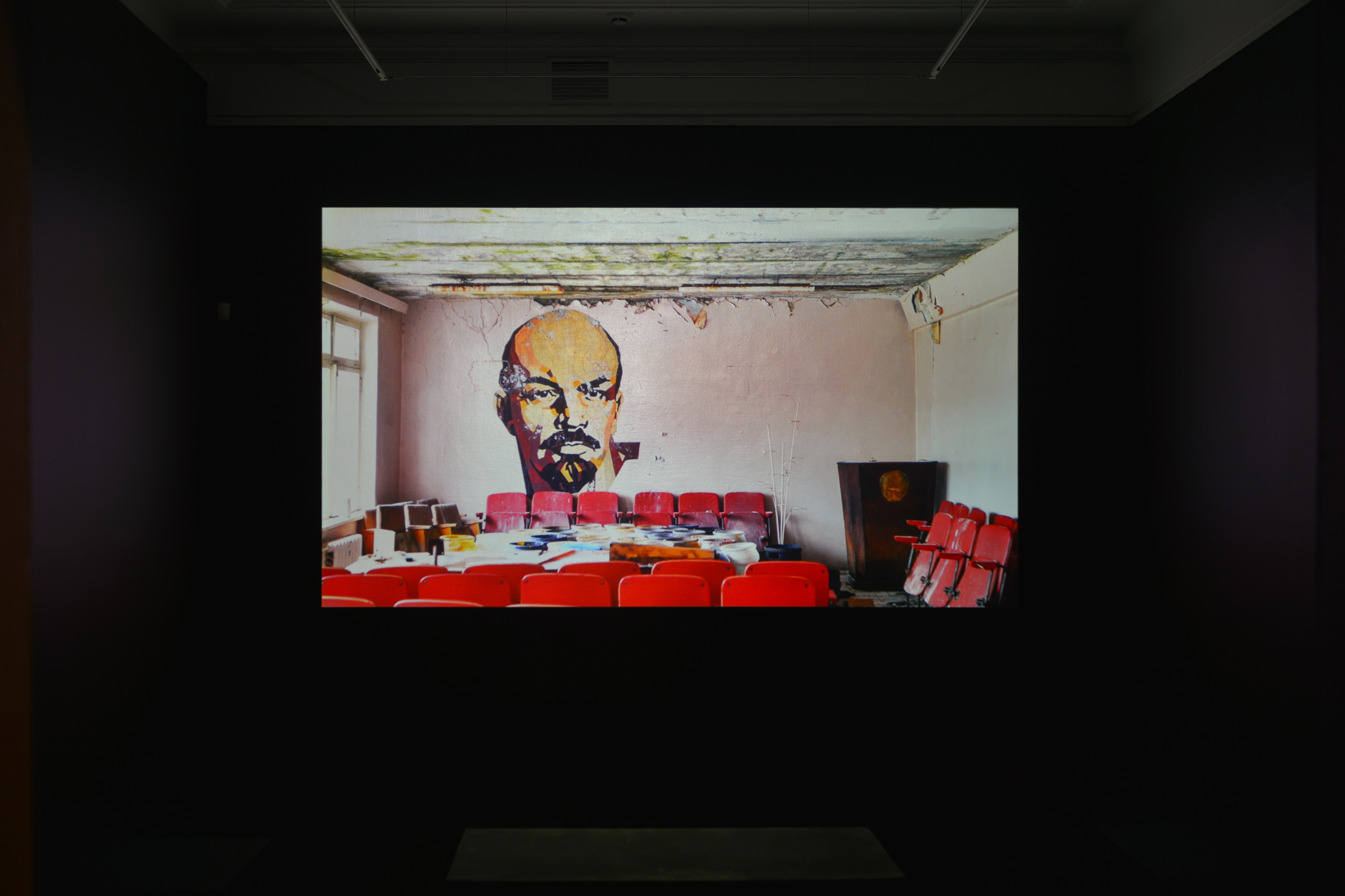
Cinema section. Exhibition view. MMOMA. 2019

=== Museum ===
The Museum section recreates the format of a local history museum and establishes the historical framework for the exhibition. Based on Otdelnov's field research in the abandoned Voroshilovsky workers' settlement in Dzerzhinsk's Eastern Industrial Zone, it combines found objects, archival materials and multimedia installations documenting the history of the city's chemical industry. Among the exhibits is Pits (2019), two lightboxes displaying photographic collages of the remains of workers' barracks, which may also have served as air-raid shelters.

A separate part, Claus (2016), is devoted to Otdelnov's correspondence with Claus Fritzsche (1923–2017), a former Luftwaffe pilot held in Soviet captivity, whose memoirs—found by the artist in the Dzerzhinsk historical archive—describe the prisoner-of-war camps near the Voroshilovsky settlement. Having established that three such camps existed near Dzerzhinsk, two of them in the eastern industrial zone, Otdelnov contacted Fritzsche by email and sent him a 1942 aerial photograph of the settlement. Fritzsche annotated a Soviet map in reply, allowing the camps—and with them the position of the vanished settlement—to be located; the resulting correspondence, photographs and maps were shown in the Museum section. The central installation is a floor projection of a satellite image of the White Sea industrial sludge reservoir, which has stored chemical waste since 1973, together with a map identifying industrial plants and waste disposal sites, including the illegal Black Hole landfill. Other works include Graphite (2016), graphite electrodes, formerly used in chlorine production and laboratory flasks containing chemical odours in the installation Odours (2019), extending the exhibition's documentary and sensory dimension.

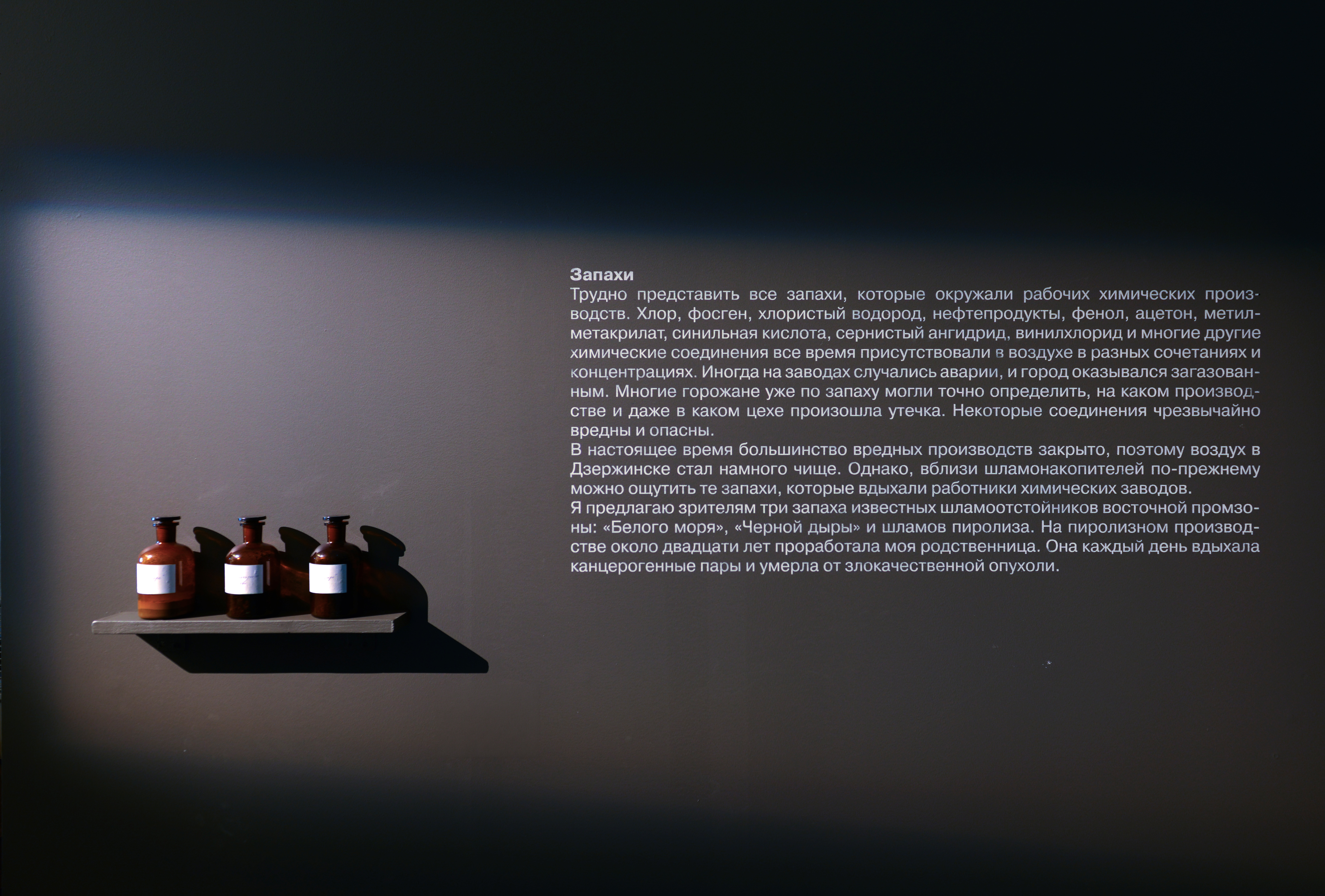
Odours. Exhibition view. 2019

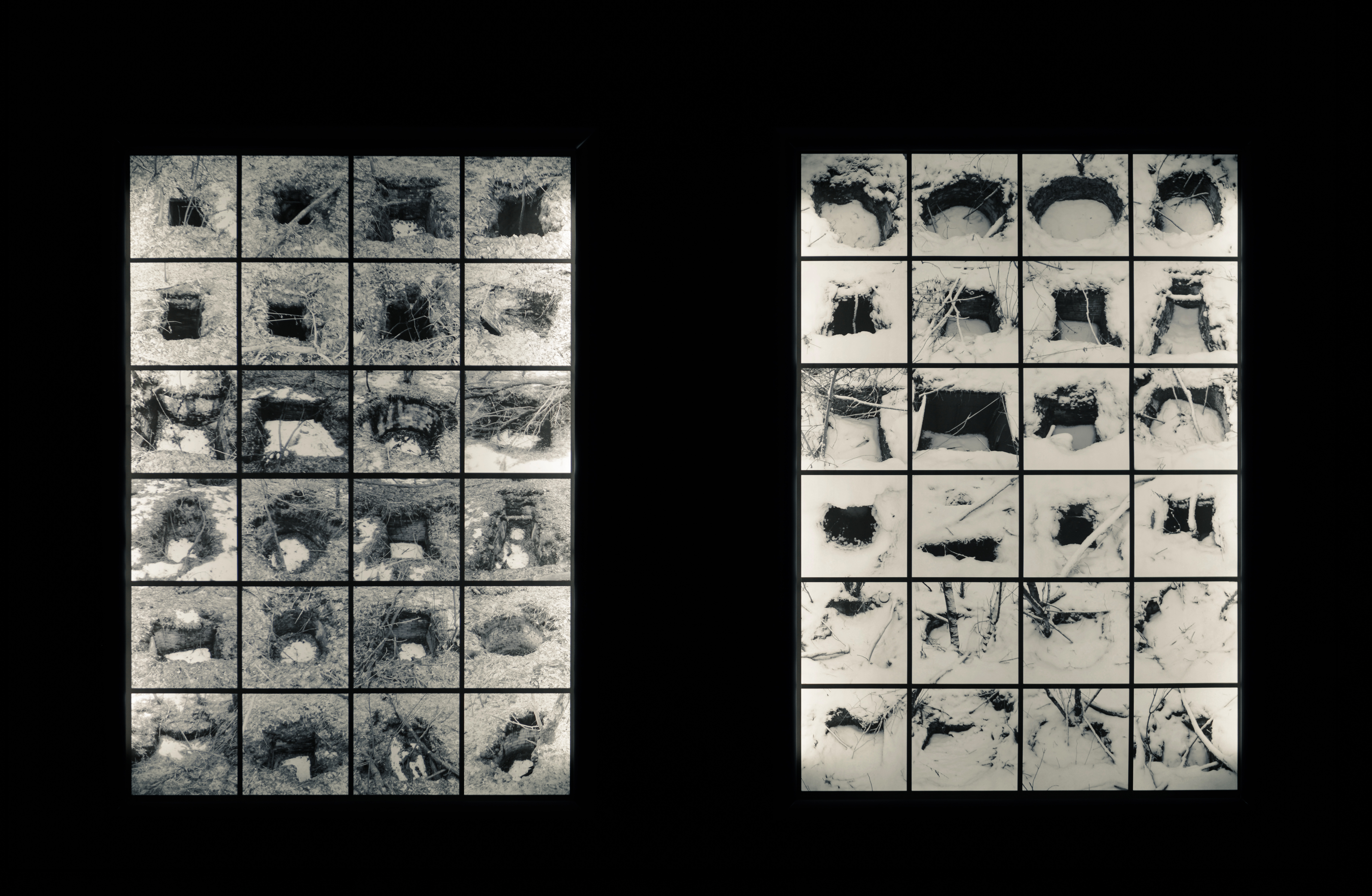
Pits. Exhibition view. 2019

=== Traces ===
The Traces section comprises paintings derived from photographs published in factory newspapers between the 1950s and the 1980s, alongside found objects including fragments of Soviet civil-defence educational films. The paintings are based on archival photographs of factory meetings, propaganda and reports on industrial accidents, and employ a halftone printing effect that deliberately reduces the clarity of the original images.

The painting 12.02.60 (2016) is based on an unpublished archival photograph of the explosion caused by a gas leak at the Kaprolaktam plant on 12 February 1960, which killed an entire shift of twenty-four workers. The disaster was not publicly reported in the Soviet press.

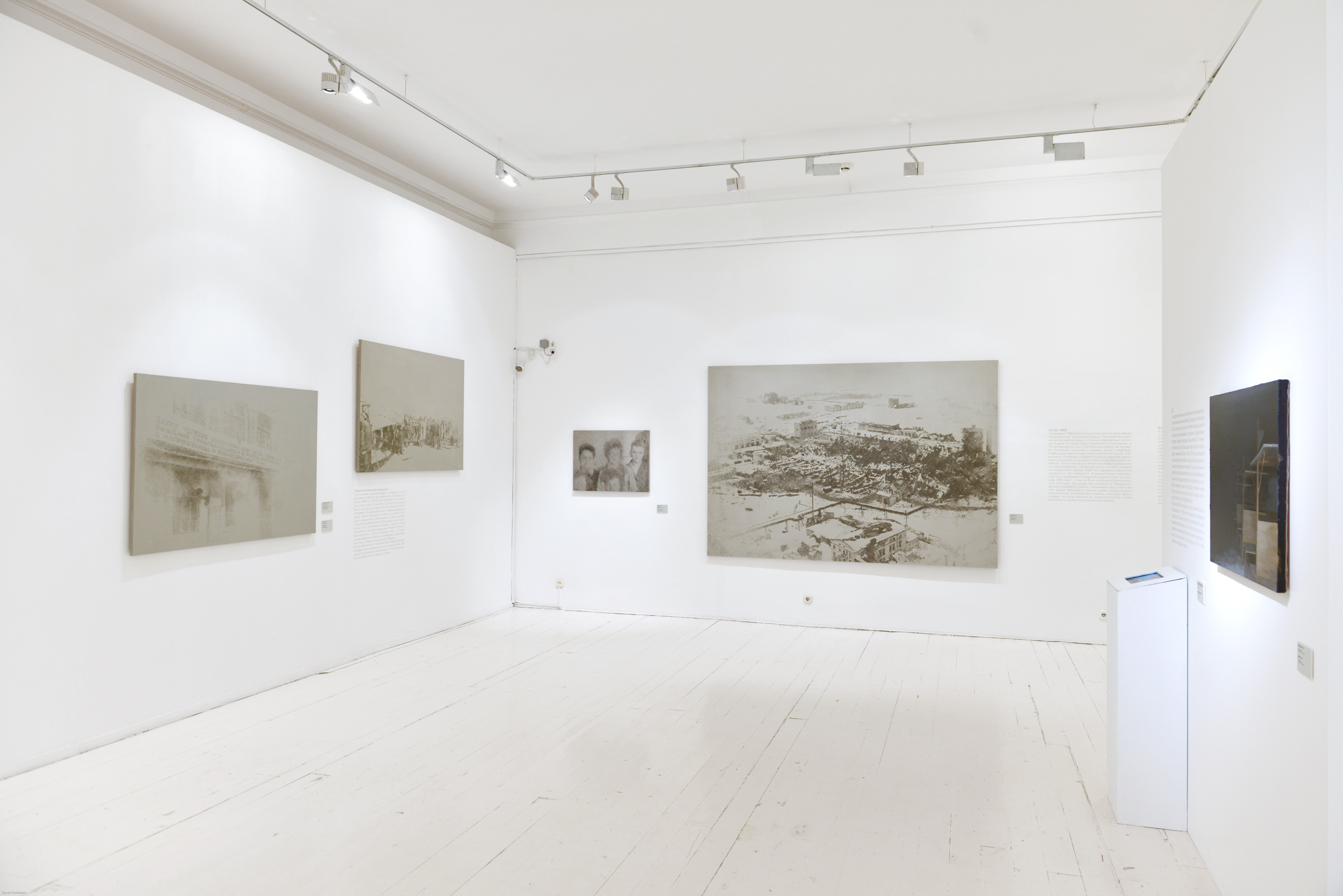
Traces section. Exhibition view. 2019

=== Wall of Fame ===
The Wall of Fame is an installation composed of paintings, based on photographs of exemplary workers published in factory and local newspapers between the 1930s and the 1980s, including Dzerzhinets, Golos rabochego (The Worker's Voice), and Za doblestny trud (For Valiant Labour). It comprises thirty-seven monochrome portraits, including a portrait of the artist's grandmother. The installation traces changes in the visual representation of industrial workers from staged studio portraits of the 1930s to more informal workplace photography of the 1980s. Discarded industrial gas masks recovered from the factory sites are displayed alongside the paintings.

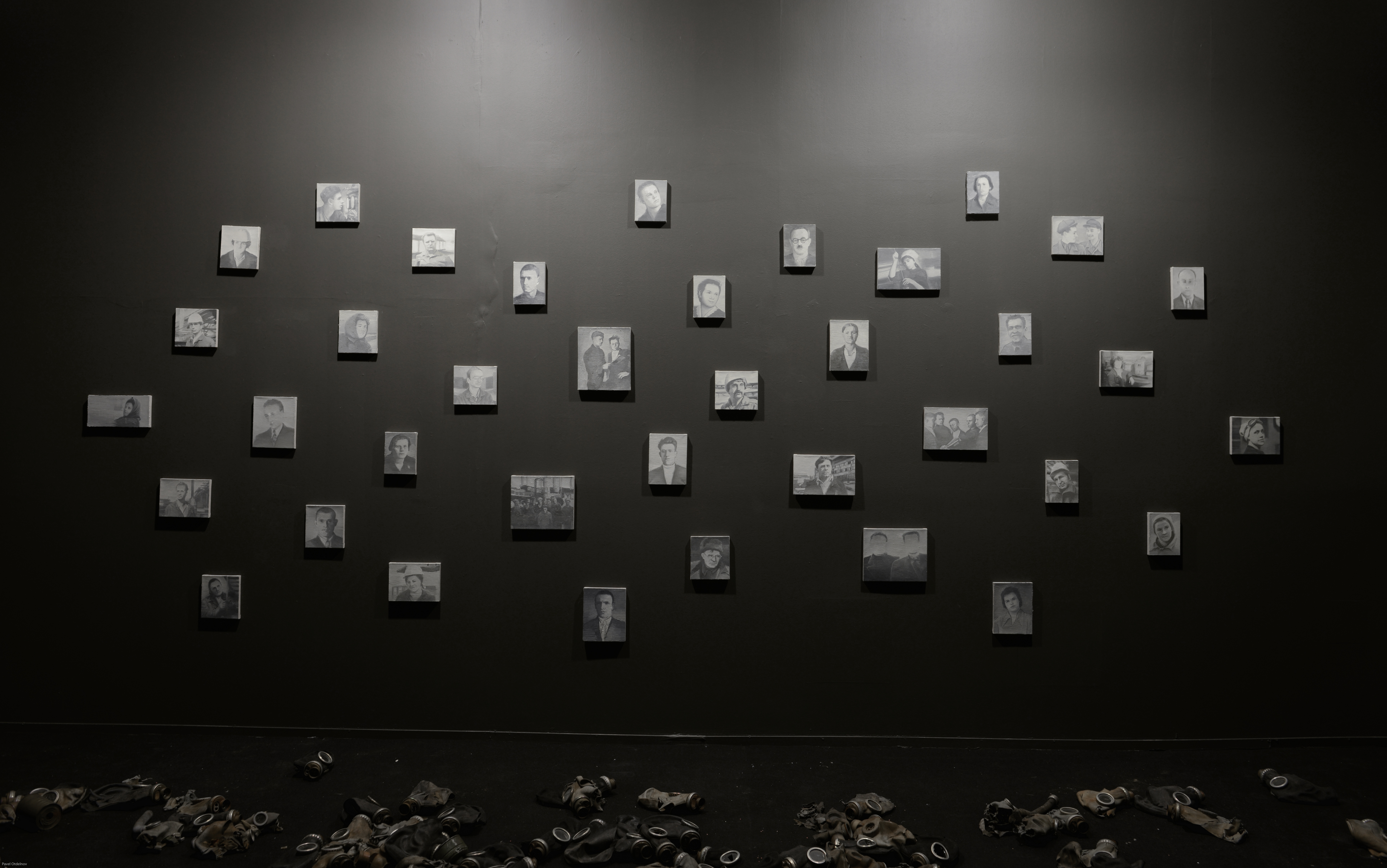
Wall of Fame section. Exhibition view. MMOMA. 2019

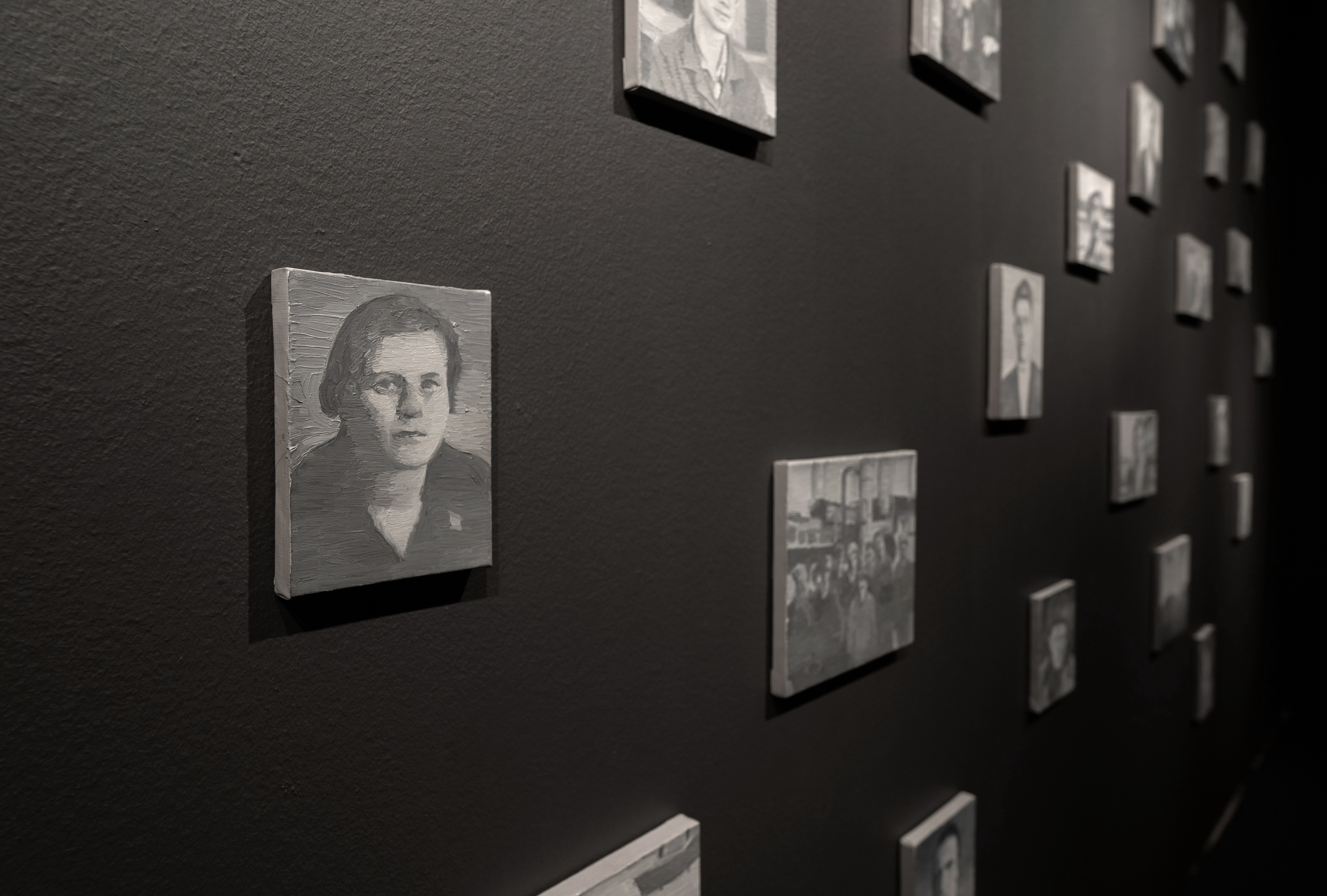
Pavel Otdelnov. Wall of Fame section. Uppsala Art Museum, 2022

=== Ruins ===
The Ruins section presents a series of large-scale paintings depicting abandoned factories and industrial interiors linked to the artist's family history. The works contain no human figures and instead treat industrial architecture as the principal subject. Elena Konyushikhina has described this treatment as a form of portraiture, arguing that Otdelnov depicts Soviet ruins within the conventions of the classical portrait genre and that the resulting melancholic atmosphere foregrounds their beauty. The series examines the decline of Dzerzhinsk's chemical industry and the legacy of Soviet industrialisation.

The paintings in the Ruins series are displayed alongside excerpts from the memoirs of the artist's father, Aleksandr Otdelnov, who worked at Dzerzhinsk's Korund and Сaprolaсtam chemical plants from 1973 to 1986 and later became director of a cosmetics factory manufacturing products for Wella, Schwarzkopf and Procter & Gamble. Originally written for the exhibition and later published as the book No Entry Without a Gas Mask,, with the support of Triumph Gallery and the Heinrich Böll Foundation, the texts provide first-hand accounts of everyday life in the Soviet chemical industry, describing workers’ exposure to toxic substances, industrial accidents, working practices and the informal culture that developed in hazardous environments. Combining technical observations with personal recollections, they portray both the risks of chemical production and the ways workers adapted to conditions where extreme hazards had become part of everyday life. Some accounts also contain elements of black humour, reflecting how workers coped with and normalised dangerous conditions.

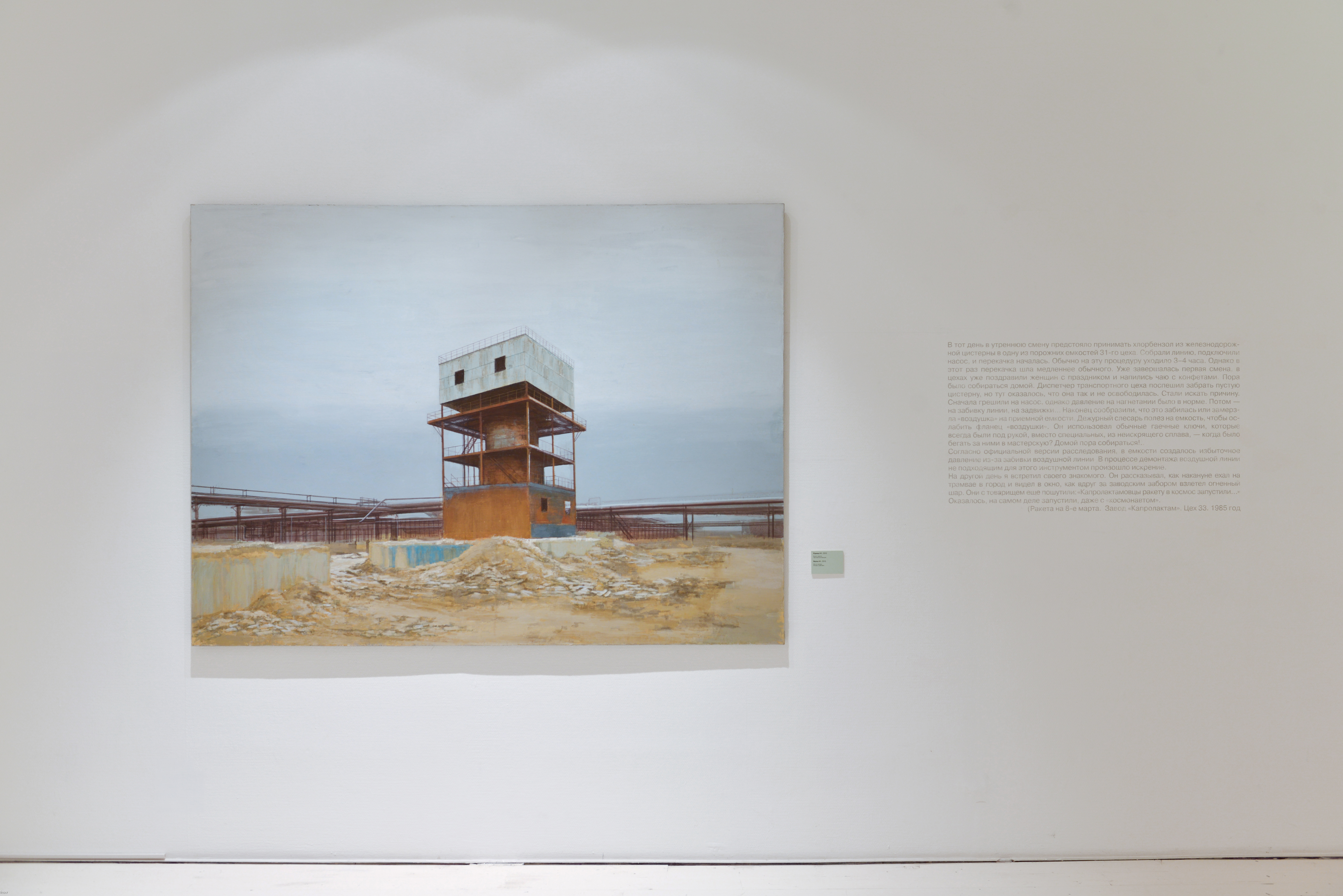
Pavel Otdelnov. Ruins section. Moscow Museum of Modern Art, 2019

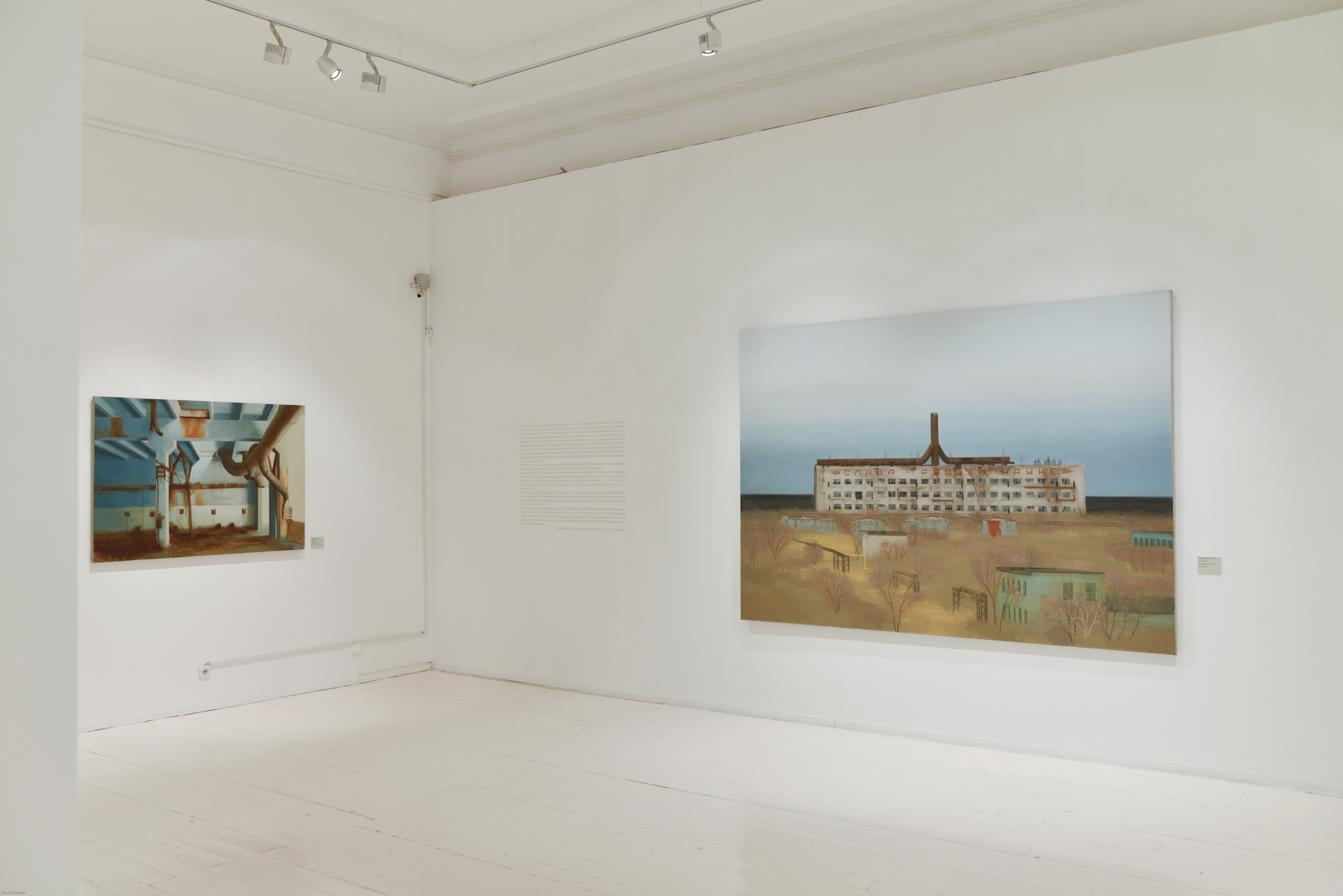
Pavel Otdelnov. Ruins section. Moscow Museum of Modern Art, 2019

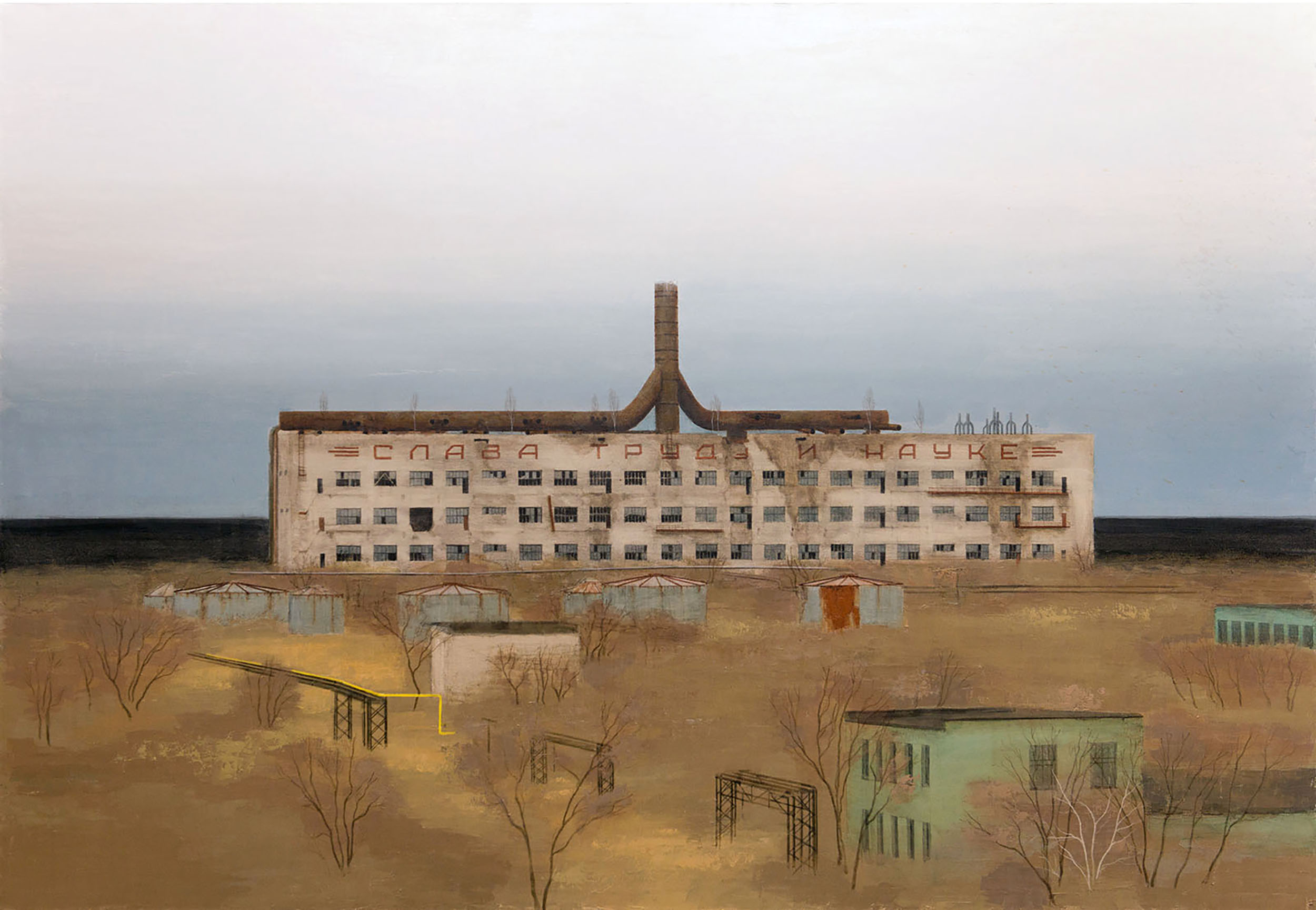
Pavel Otdelnov. Glory to Labour. 2016

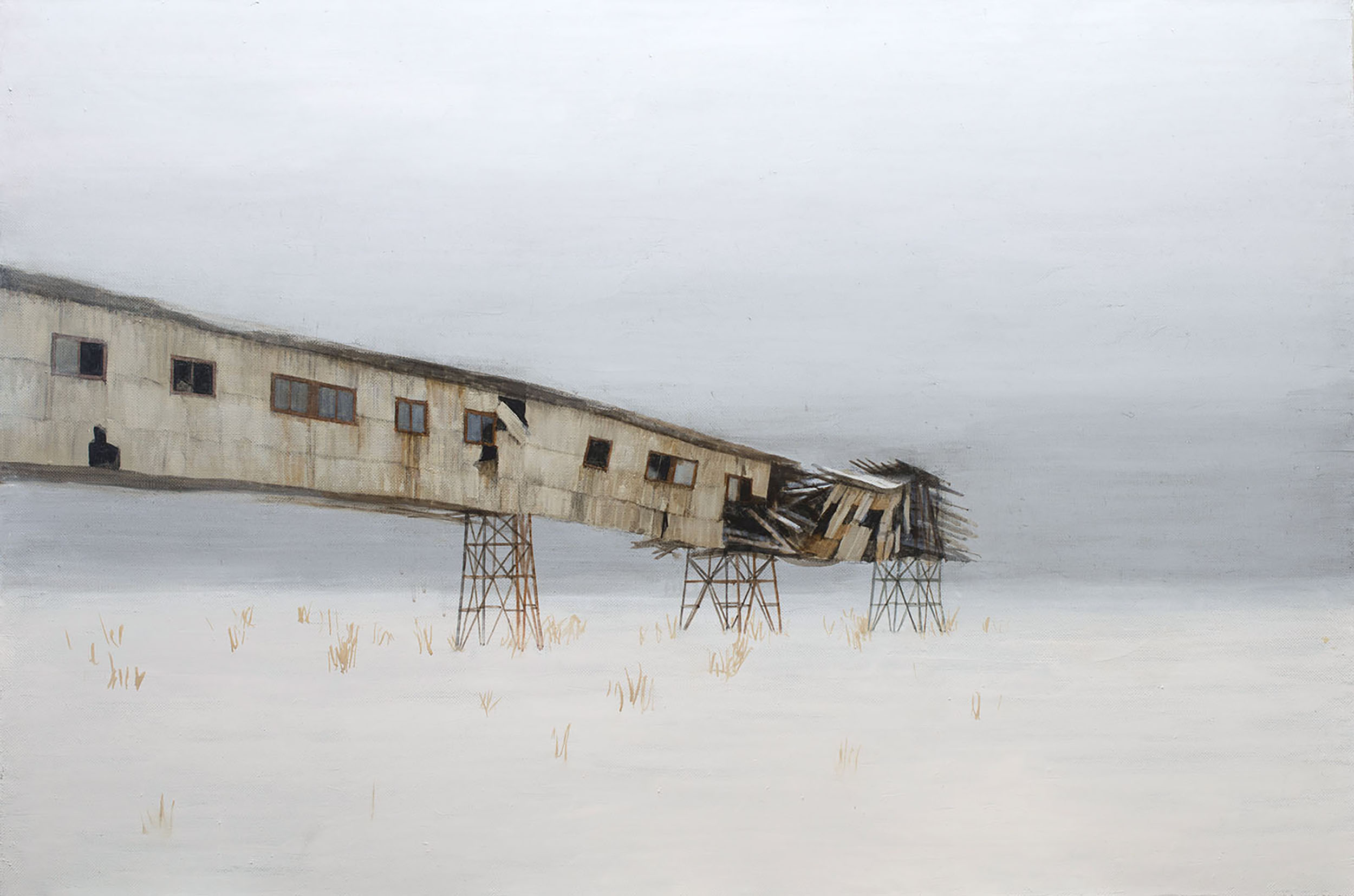
Pavel Otdelnov. Ruins. Passage. 2017

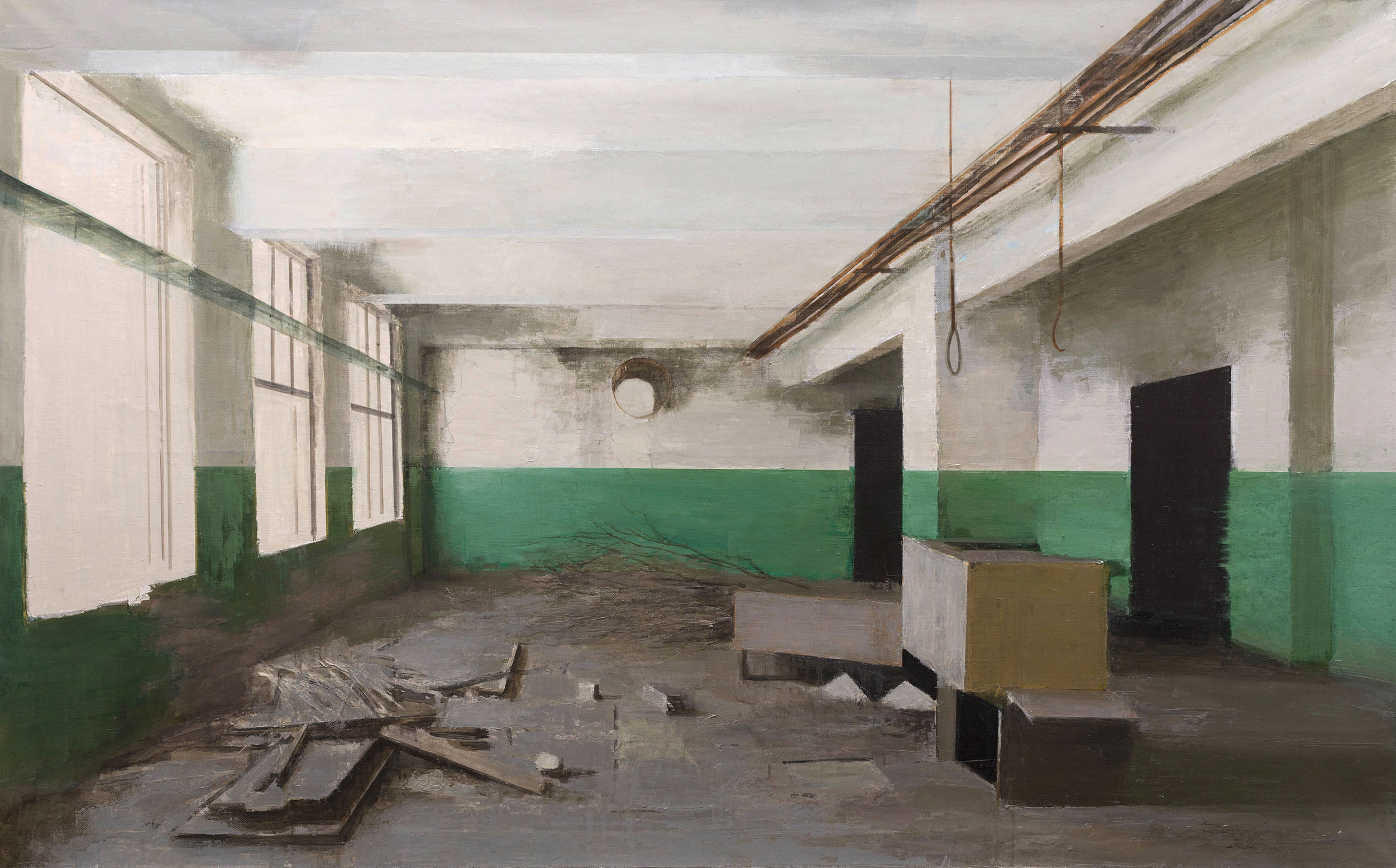
Pavel Otdelnov. Ruins. Plexiglass workshop. 2017

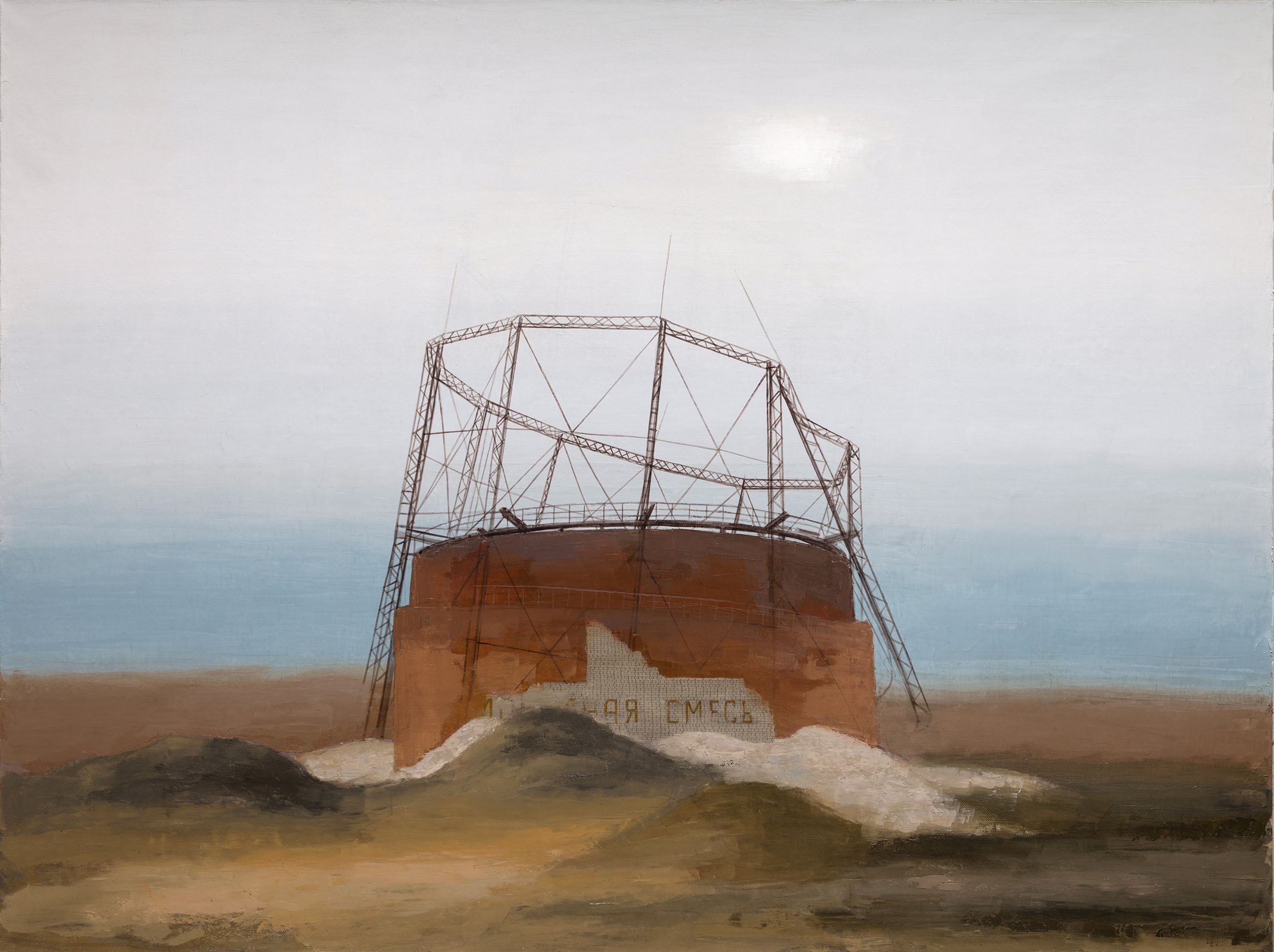
Pavel Otdelnov. Ruins. Gas Holder. 2017

=== Sand ===
The Sand section focuses on the contemporary condition of the city of Dzerzhinsk and its industrial zone. Several works examine the disappearance of the city's industrial infrastructure, including Tracks (2018), which depicts the abandoned Dzerzhinsk tram before its tracks were dismantled.

Other paintings address the environmental legacy of the chemical industry, including the illegal hazardous waste dump known as a "Black Hole", Hazardous Area (2018), and the simazine underground waste disposal repository established in 1976, Deep Waste Repository (2017). The section concludes with Mutant (2018), a found object representing the long-term ecological effects of industrial pollution.

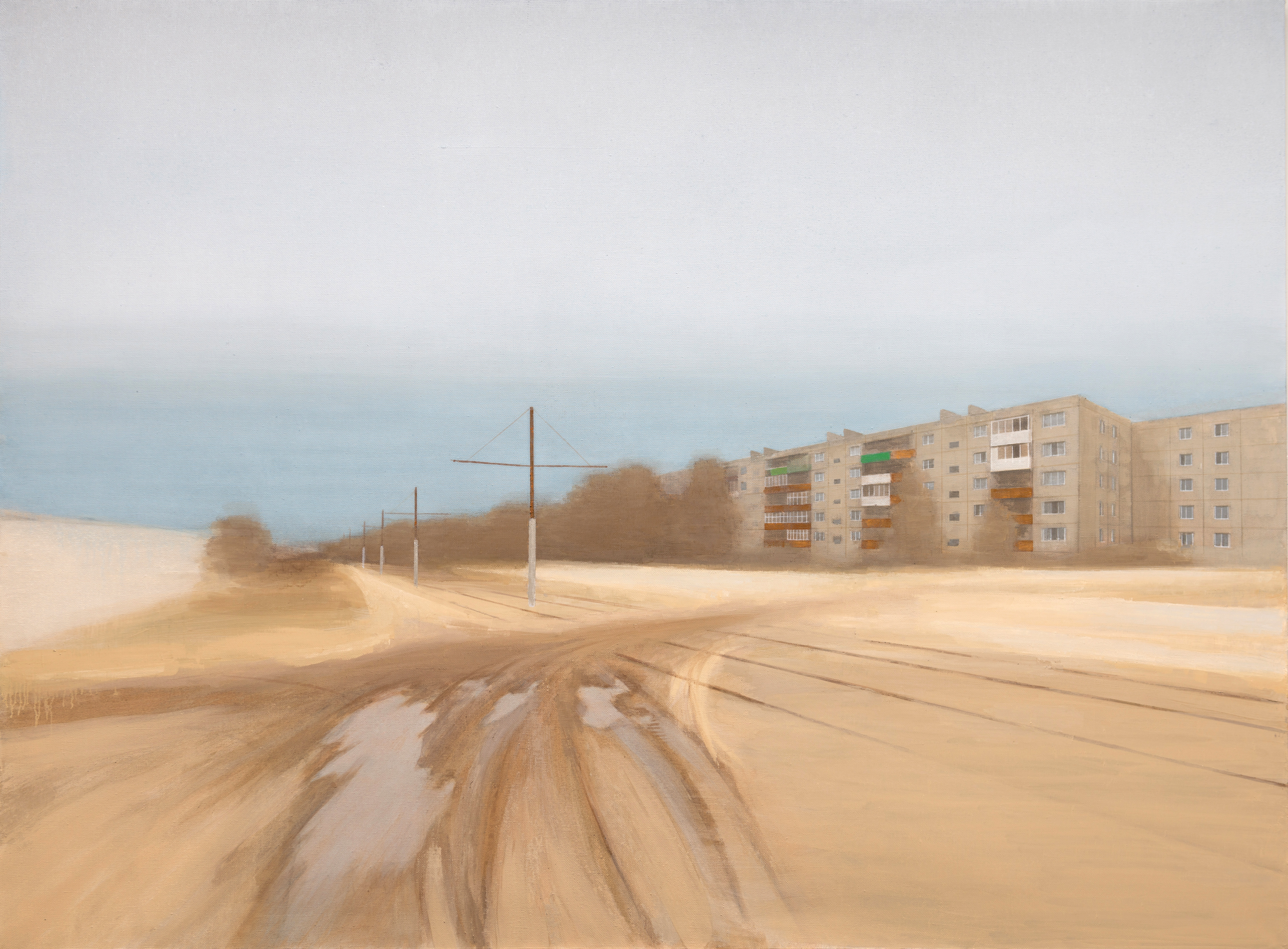
Pavel Otdelnov. Tracks. 2018

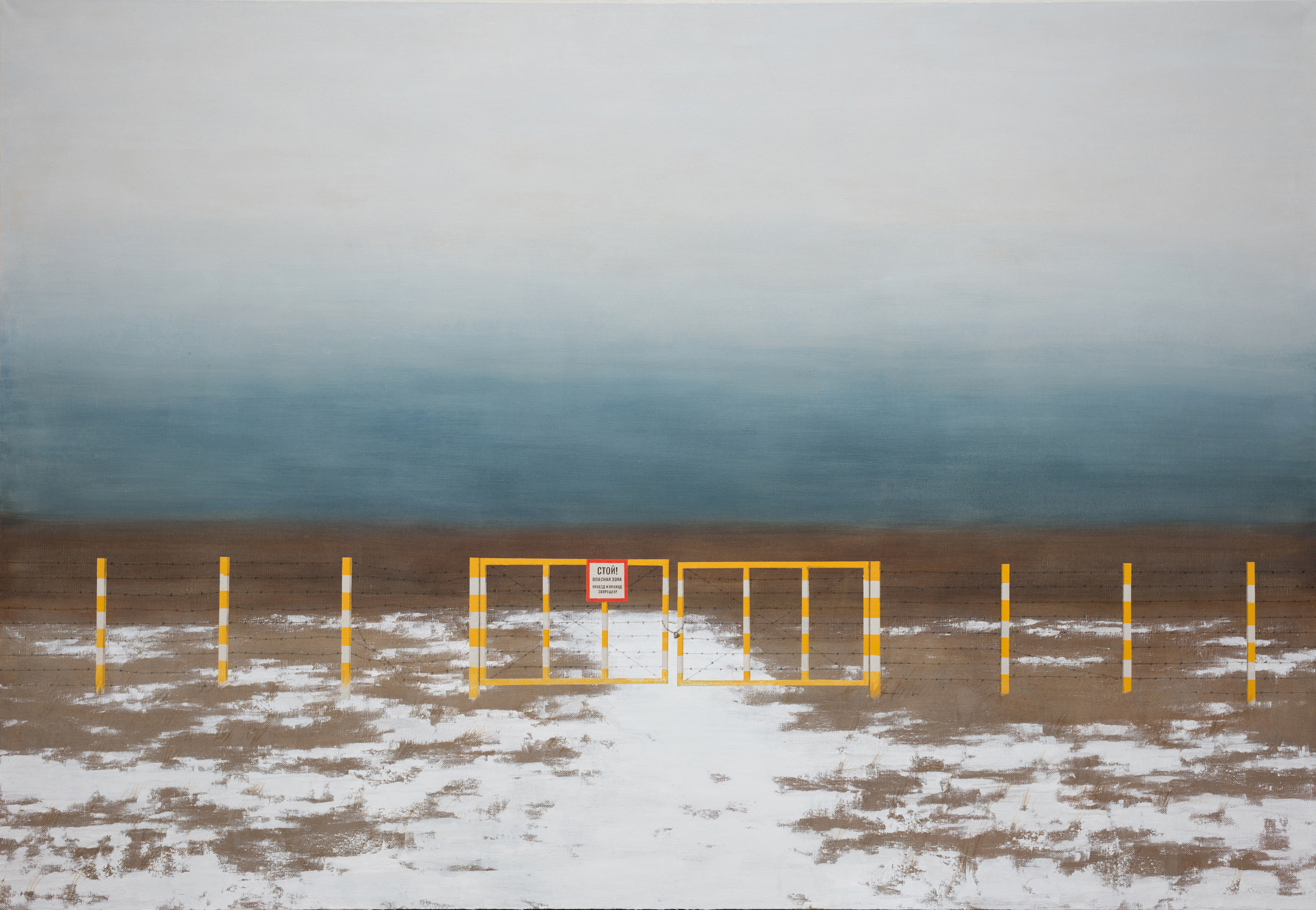
Pavel Otdelnov. Hazardous Area. 2018

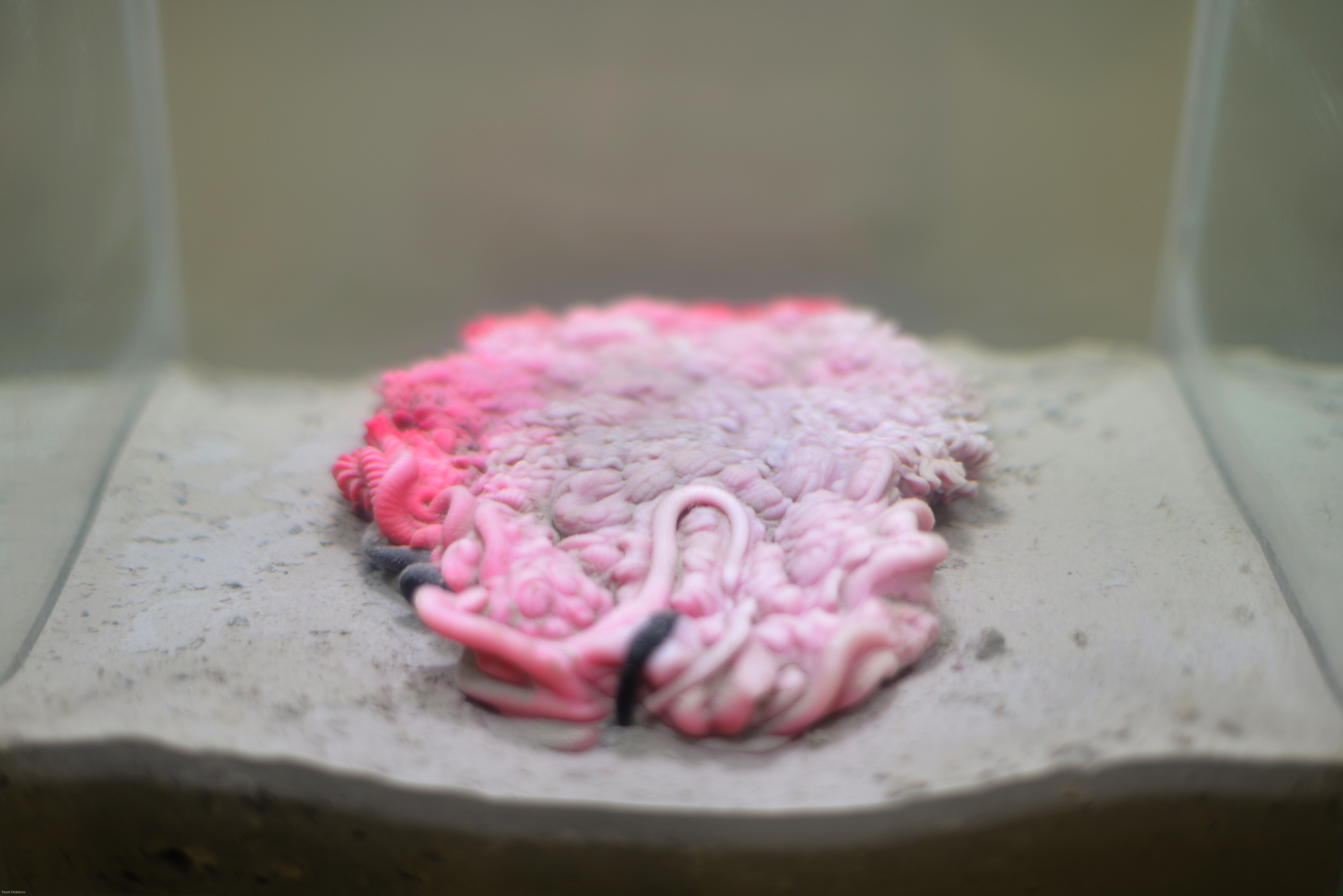
Pavel Otdelnov. Mutant. 2018

=== Cinema ===
The Cinema section presents films documenting the abandoned industrial landscape of Dzerzhinsk. The films Chemical Plant (2019) and From the White Sea to the Black Hole (2019), projected on opposing walls, use aerial footage to record derelict factories, industrial ruins and toxic waste sites. The soundtrack was composed by KernHerbst.

Subjects of Memory (2016, 30 min.) is based on interviews with members of the artist's family. Divided into three chapters: Settlement, Factory and Sludge, the film examines the history of the Voroshilovsky Workers' settlement, the decline of Dzerzhinsk's chemical industry, and its environmental consequences. The artist interviewed his elderly relatives and retraced the layout of the now-demolished settlement where both of his parents were born. Their recollections include accounts of working in the nearby top-secret chemical factories and of fatal accidents that occurred there.

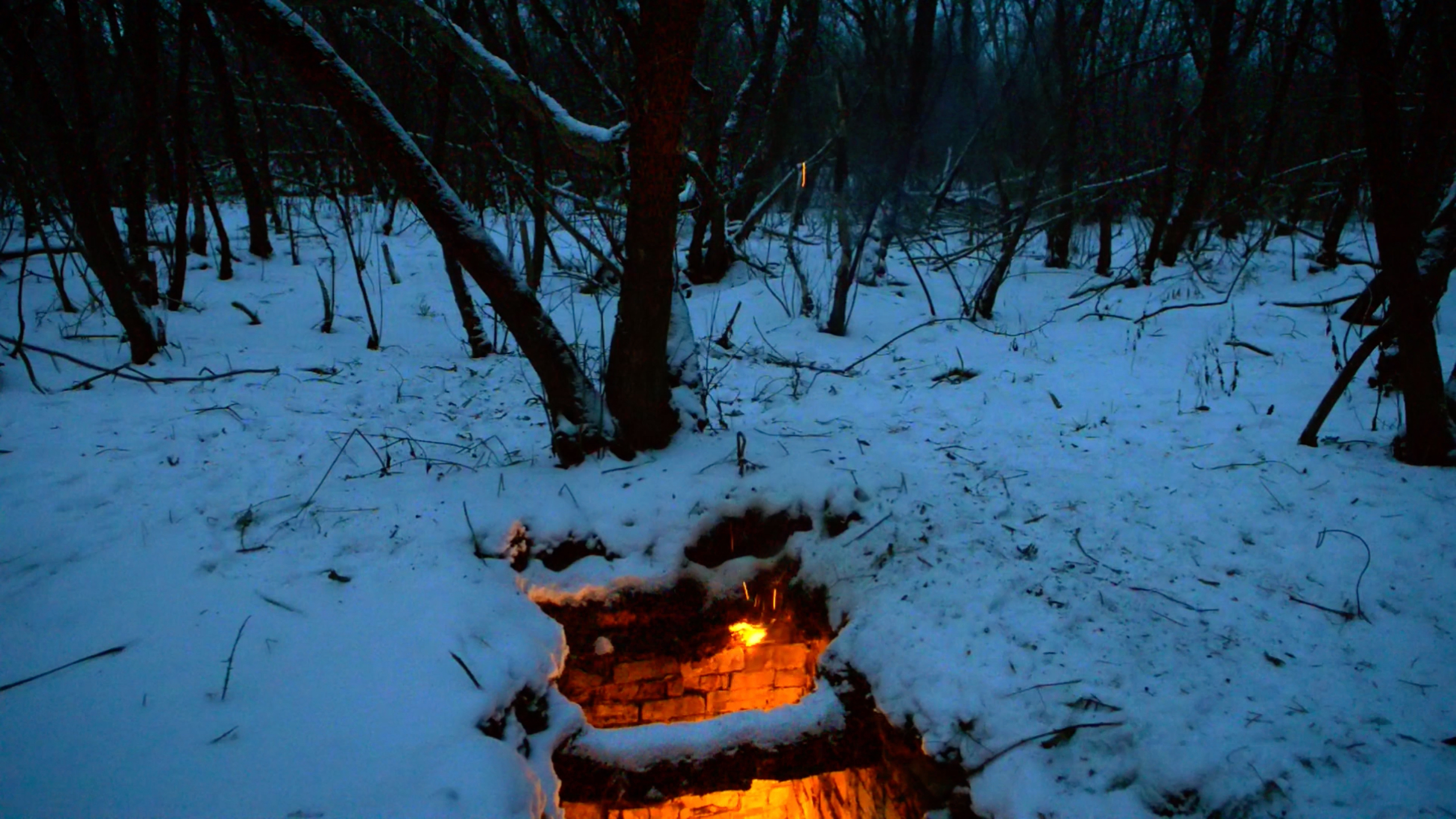
Pavel Otdelnov. Subjects of Memory. Film still. 2016

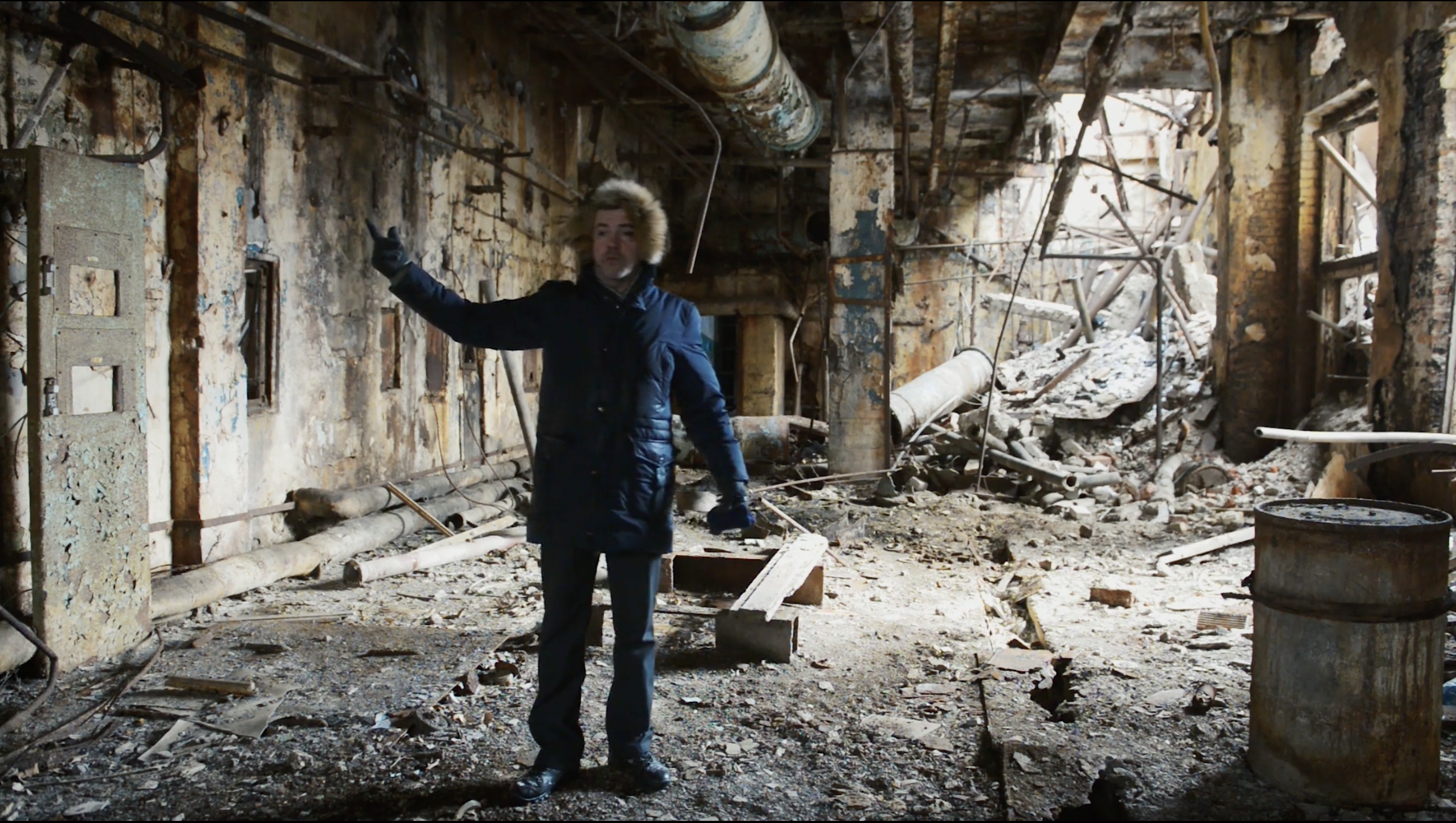
Pavel Otdelnov. Subjects of Memory. Film still. 2016

Chemical Plant (2019, 19 min.) documents the abandoned factories of Dzerzhinsk through aerial footage.

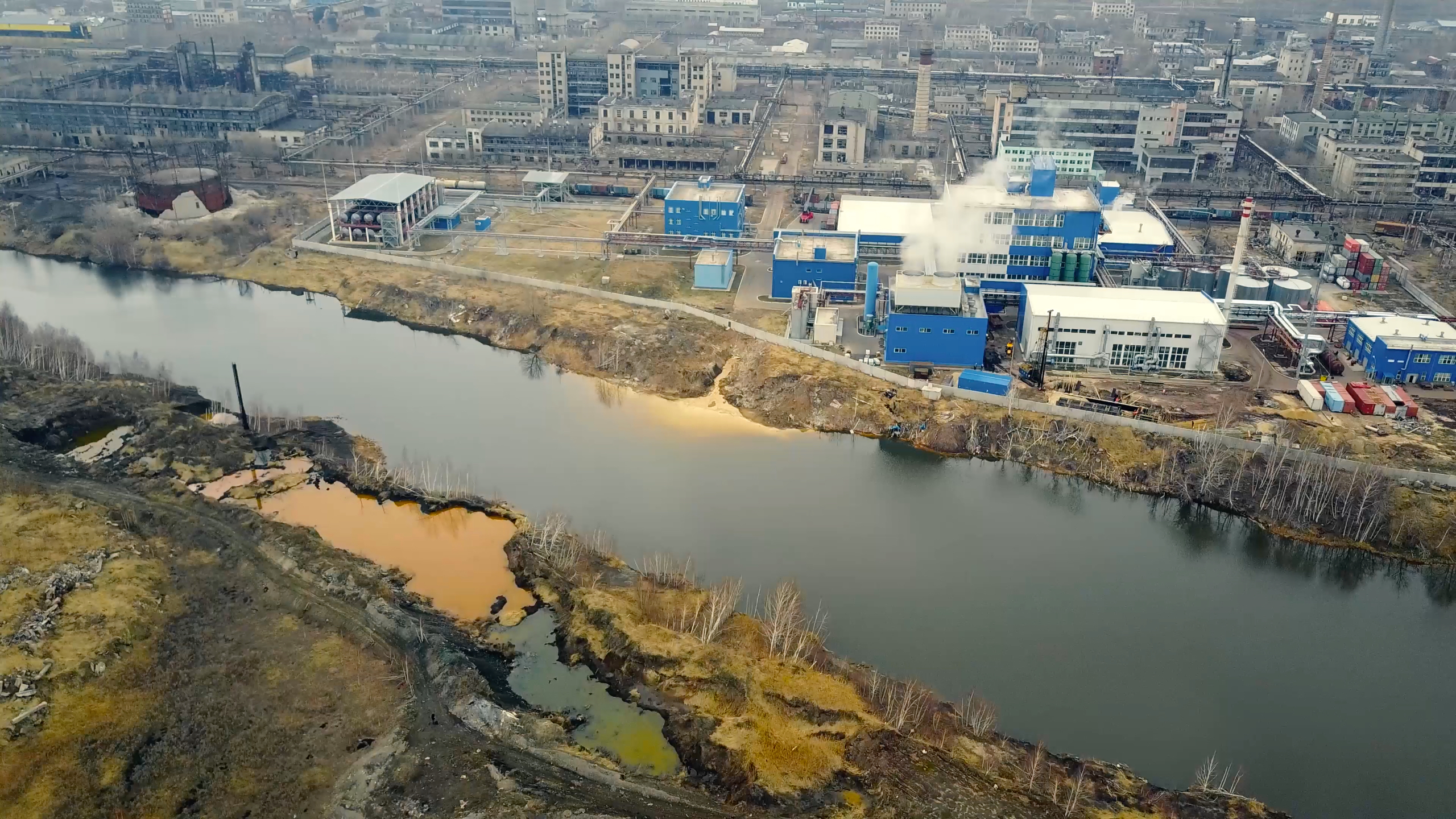
Pavel Otdelnov. Chemical Plant. Film still. 2019

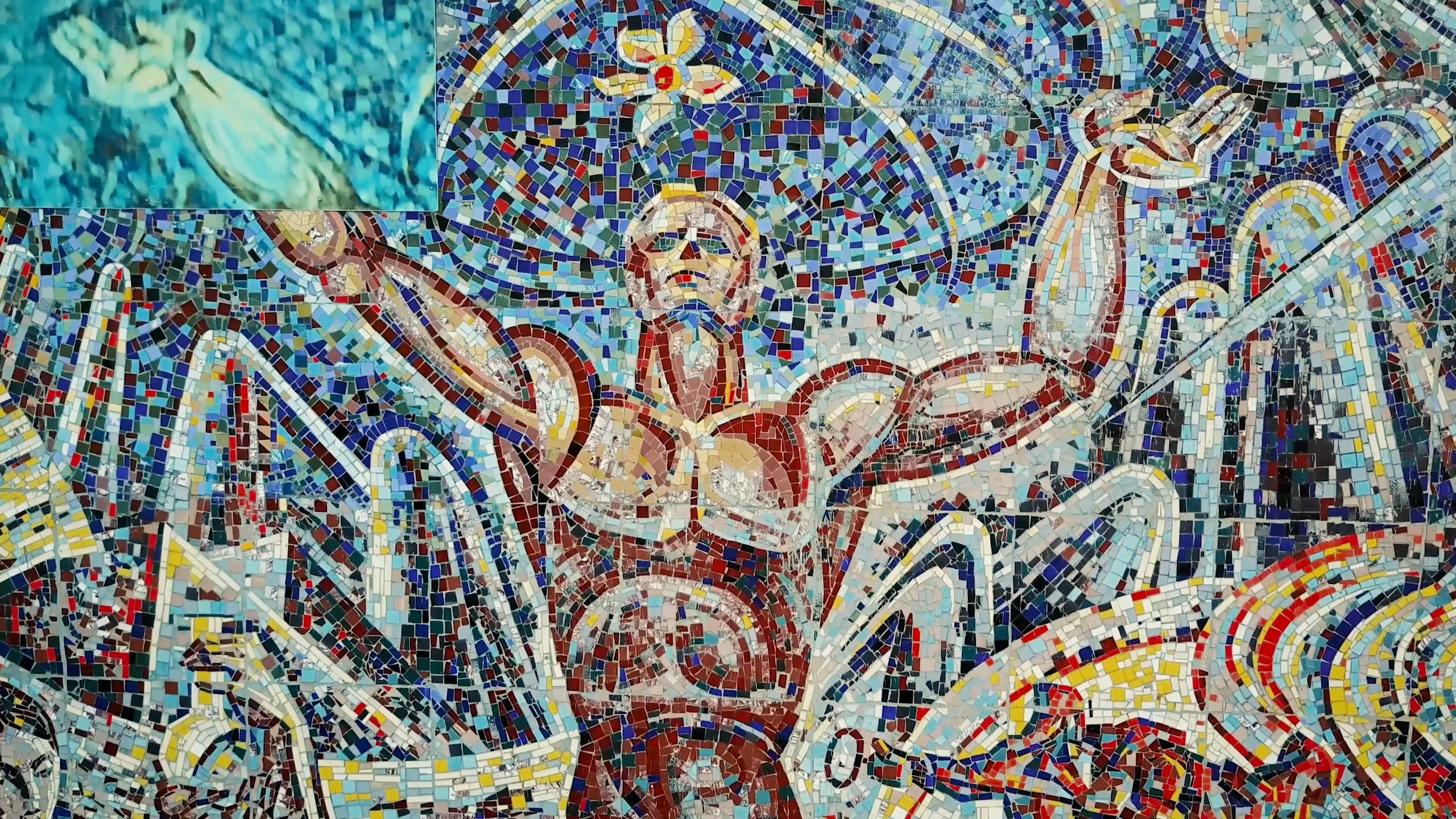
Pavel Otdelnov. Chemical Plant. Film still. 2019

From the White Sea to the Black Hole (2019, 19 min.) examines the city's principal sites of industrial pollution, including sludge pits and chemical waste deposits.

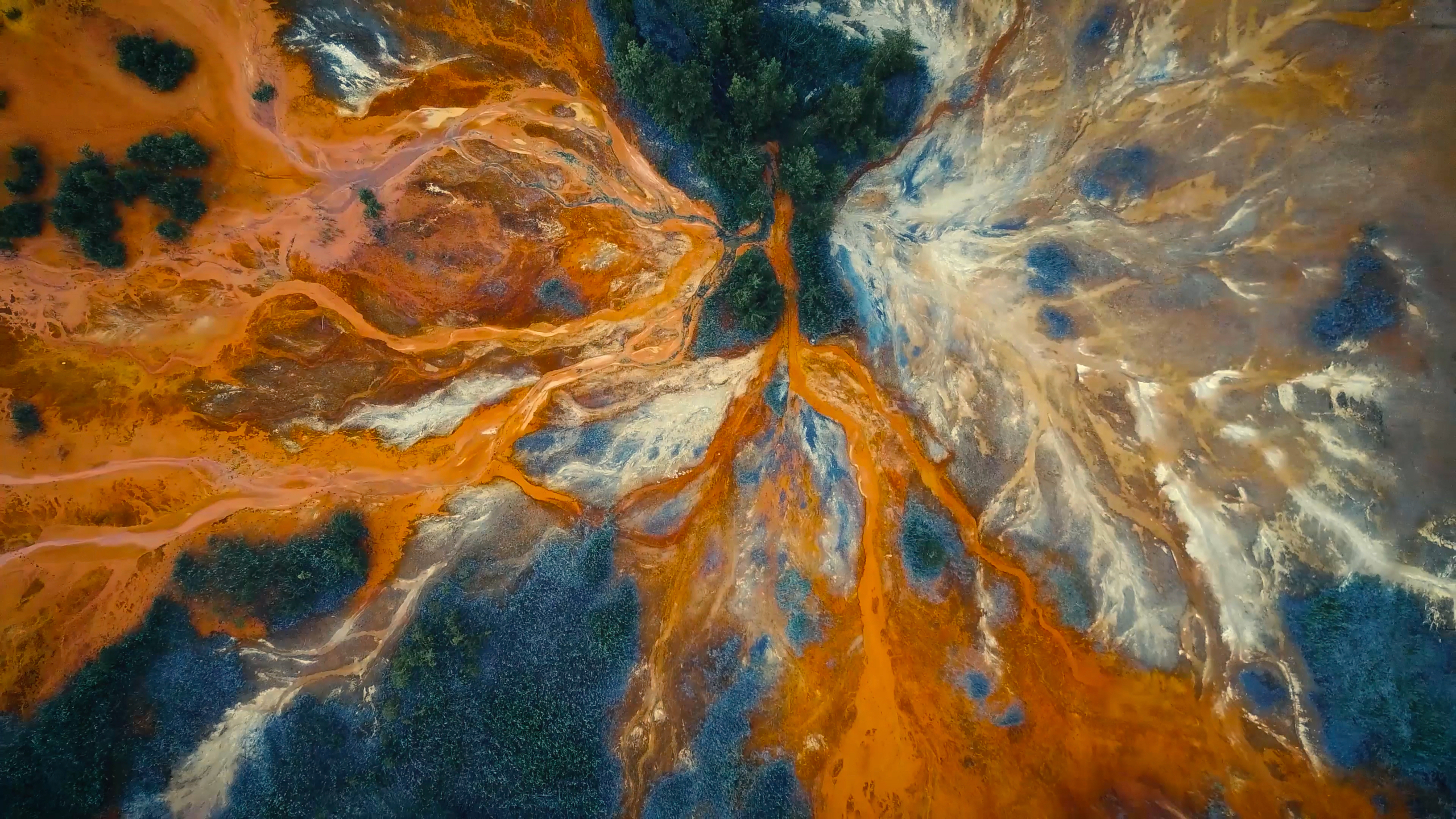
Pavel Otdelnov. From White sea to Black hole. Film still. 2019

== Critical reception ==
=== Visual language and references ===
Critics have noted that Promzona draws on a wide range of visual and literary references, including Socialist Realism, classical history painting, Pop art, contemporary figurative painting, the films of Andrei Tarkovsky and documentary literature. According to reviewers, the combination of these visual languages constructs an image of the abandoned industrial zone as a space suspended between a collapsed past and an unrealised future.

Kommersant magazine described Otdelnov as "the Piranesi of deindustrialisation", arguing that while three generations of his family had helped build and operate Dzerzhinsk's military-industrial complex, the artist documents the melancholic ruins of that Soviet industrial utopia.

=== Modernism and industrial ruins ===
Ivan Streltsov and Vladimir Dudchenko have interpreted Promzona as an exploration of modernism through the prism of historical and social trauma. Streltsov argues that Otdelnov reworks the modernist motif of the grid, described by Rosalind Krauss as a symbol of artistic autonomy, by exposing it to the historical realities of industrial accidents, censorship and environmental degradation. Dudchenko similarly characterises "Otdelnov's Dzerzhinsk" as a "ruin of modernism" and a "lost version of the future", relating the project to the legacy of Alexander Rodchenko.

Maria Engström and Aleksei Semenenko situate Otdelnov’s work within a broader contemporary fascination with post-socialist ruins, Soviet waste landscapes and the remains of modernist utopias. They argue that Otdelnov’s projects address not only the disappearance of material traces of the Soviet industrial world but also the experience of a future that failed to materialise, connecting abandoned industrial landscapes with the personal trauma of the present, in which an unfulfilled future is replaced by oblivion.

=== Non-places and demilitarisation ===
Art critic Konstantin Zatsepin describes the abandoned places depicted by Otdelnov as "non-places". Elena Konyushikhina notes that here the term takes on the opposite meaning. Marc Augé used it for spaces of transit, commerce and leisure, which people pass through without forming a personal connection. In Promzona the reverse happens: the artist restores the history of abandoned factories and settlements and turns them into places of memory for local communities.

=== Memory and nostalgia ===
Writing for Colta, Maksim Burov and Nadia Plungyan argued that Promzona distances itself both from postmodern irony and from the confessional emotionality associated with Svetlana Alexievich, instead using documentary material and family testimony to examine the relationship between individual memory and the Soviet past without reducing it to either political statement or autobiographical narrative.

By keeping in touch with the voices of those who witnessed the 20th century (his grandmother, father, the former POW Claus Fritzsche), Otdelnov investigates how they relate to the present. The artist's objective is to not get stuck in the past, but to capture the point where the Soviet experience, while still the experience of his family, no longer defines him.

— Nadia Plungyan and Maksim Burov,

Ekaterina Tarasova has interpreted Promzona as an example of reflective nostalgia, arguing that the project presents the Soviet industrial city as a utopian project remembered through the combined use of archival documents, photographs and artistic interpretation, while questioning the possibility of an objective representation of the past.

=== Criticism of aestheticisation ===
Art historian Tatiana Mironova has described Promzona as an example of artistic research that approaches local history through personal and family memory. She argues that, by combining the format of a museum display with family archives, the project presents the history of place as an intersection of individual experience and broader political and historical processes. In a separate review, however, Mironova criticised the exhibition for aestheticising industrial catastrophe and presenting the ruins of Soviet industry as objects of contemplation, while giving limited attention to questions of responsibility, political conflict and the experiences of those directly affected.

=== Reassessment after 2022 ===
Elena Konyushikhina argues that the meaning of Promzona changed with the 2022 Russian invasion of Ukraine. Before the full-scale invasion, the project drew attention to places and communities facing erasure and treated the ruins as worth preserving. After 2022 some of these sites were remilitarised, with military production resumed in Dzerzhinsk, turning what the project had recorded as abandoned ruins into war infrastructure. Konyushikhina cautions against reading the romanticised treatment of Soviet ruins in the 2010s as sympathy for the Russian state. She describes Otdelnov's work instead as a critical engagement with the Soviet past that challenges dominant historical narratives.

=== Swedish press reception ===
The exhibition received attention in the Swedish Press, where critics and journalists discussed Promzona in relation to historical memory, personal testimony and the legacy of Soviet industrialisation. Maria Zennström in Aftonbladet described the exhibition as a form of artistic research, emphasising Otdelnov's combination of painting, film, photography, objects and archival material, while noting its accessibility and wider relevance. In Dagens Nyheter, Matilda Källén discussed the exhibition's themes of memory, propaganda and political violence, relating Promzona to the impact of ideological systems on individuals and communities.

Following the 2022 Russian invasion of Ukraine, Swedish media also placed the exhibition in the context of Otdelnov's criticism of the Russian government and opposition to the war. Articles in Dagens Nyheter and Flamman highlighted the renewed relevance of the exhibition's themes of suppressed history, state narratives and the legacy of Soviet and post-Soviet structures after the outbreak of war. They also covered Otdelnov's departure from Russia and his position as an artist critical of the Russian government. The exhibition also became part of a Swedish debate about cultural cooperation with Russian artists after the invasion. Uppsala Art Museum (Swedish: Uppsala konstmuseum) defended continuing the exhibition, arguing that individual artists should not be equated with the Russian state or held responsible for its actions.

== Exhibitions ==
- 2015 – Board of Honour, Stavropol Regional Museum of Fine Arts, Stavropol
- 2016 – Territory of Accumulated Damage, Belyaevo Gallery, Moscow.
- 2016 – White Sea. Black Hole, NCCA Arsenal, Nizhny Novgorod
- 2017 – Ruins, Victoria Gallery, Samara
- 2017 – Wall of Fame and Ruins, main project of the 4th Ural Industrial Biennial of Contemporary Art, Yekaterinburg
- 2018 – Factory Anecdotes, Creative Industrial Cluster Oktava. Tula
- 2018 – Chemical Plant, FUTURO Gallery, Nizhny Novgorod
- 2019 – Promzona, Moscow Museum of Modern Art, Moscow
- 2020 – Promzona, Innovation Prize exhibition, Arsenal, Nizhny Novgorod.
- 2021 – Promzona, Kandinsky Prize exhibition, Moscow Museum of Modern Art.
- 2022 – Promzona, Uppsala Art Museum, Uppsala, Sweden.
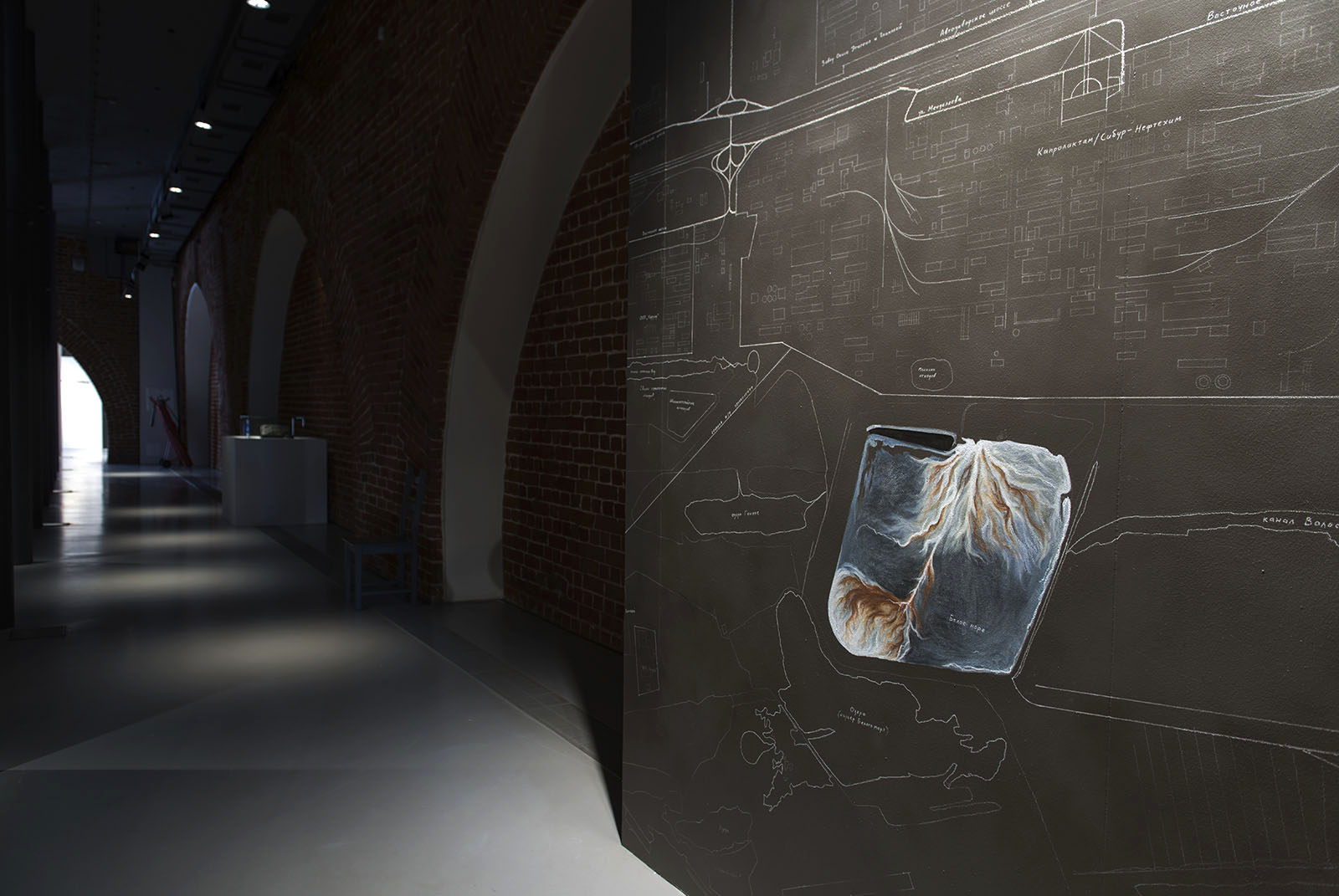
From White sea to Black hole. Exhibition view. Arsenal, Nizhny Novgorod. 2016

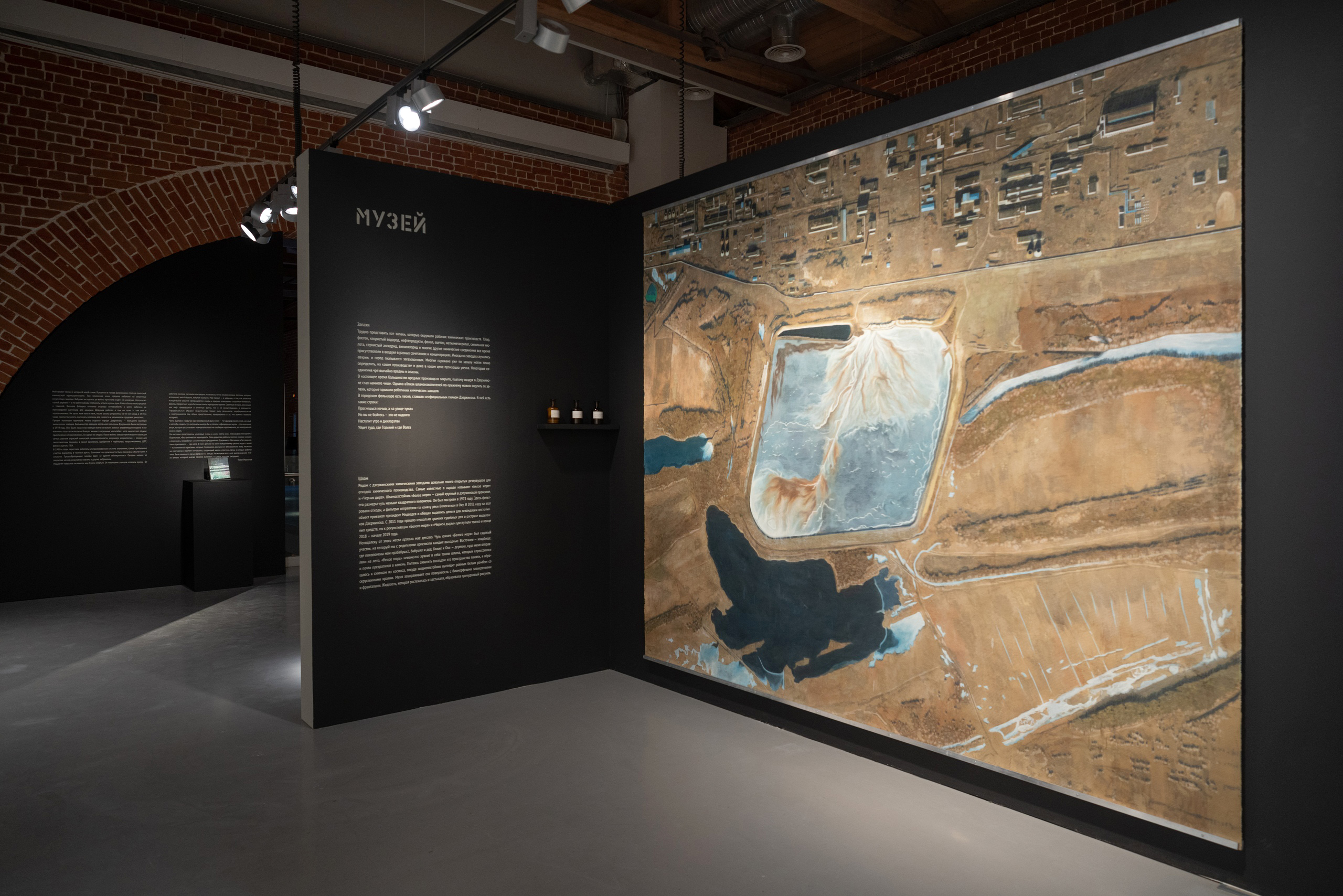
Promzona. Exhibition view. Arsenal, Nizhny Novgorod. 2020

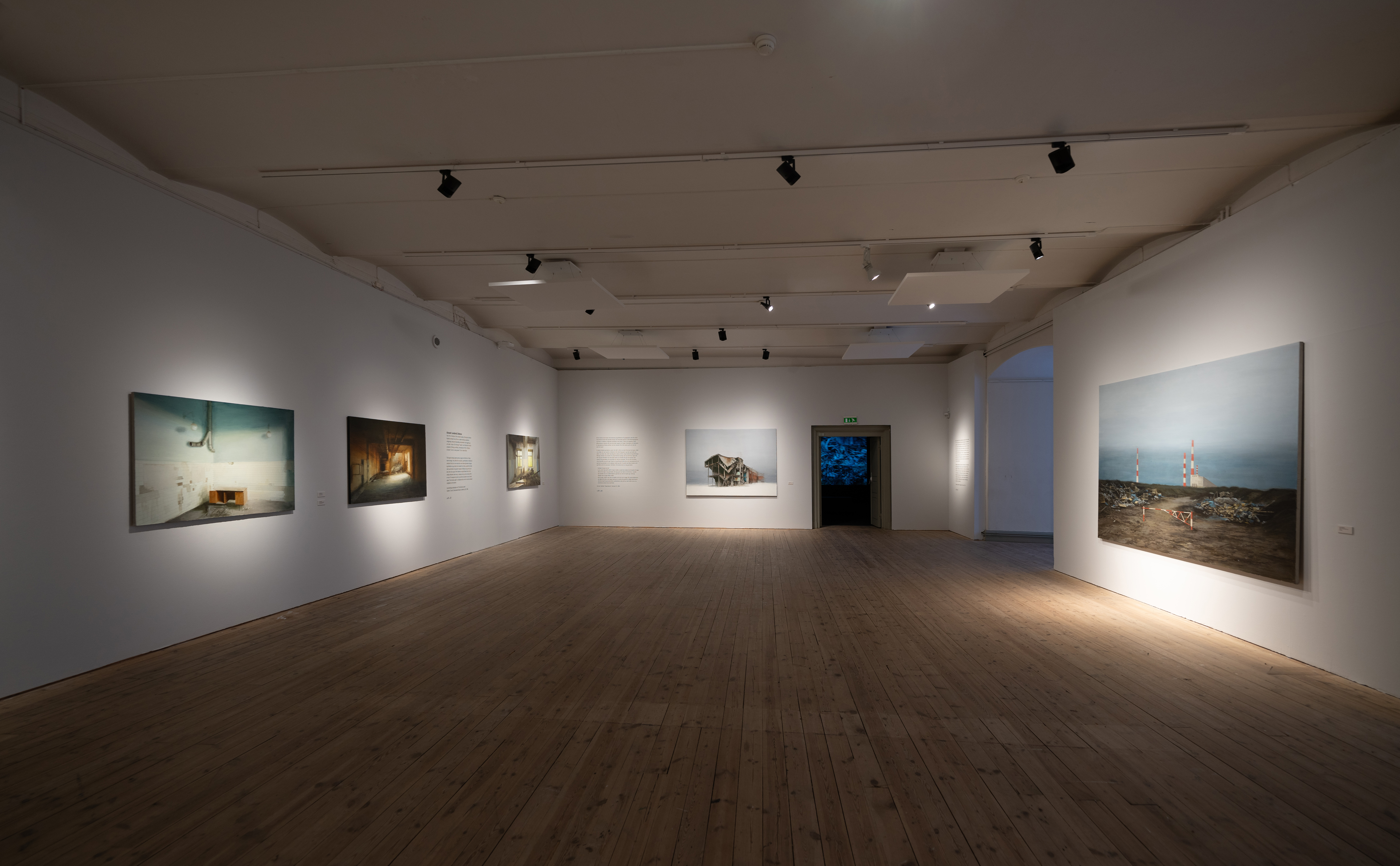
Promzona. Exhibition view. Uppsala Art Museum, Uppsala. 2022

== Awards and nominations ==
- 2017 – Shortlisted for the Sergey Kuryokhin Contemporary Art Award (Best Visual Artwork) for White Sea. Black Hole.
- 2017 – Special Prize of the Institut de France at the Sergey Kuryokhin Contemporary Art Award.
- 2017 – Longlisted for the Kandinsky Prize (Project of the Year) for White Sea. Black Hole.
- 2020 – Winner of the Innovation Prize (Artist of the Year) for Promzona.
- 2021 – Shortlisted for the Kandinsky Prize (Project of the Year) for Promzona.

== Scholarly articles ==
- P. A. Otdelnov (2019). The Art Project "Promzona": Family History as Part of the History of a Country. In Philosophical Letters: Russian and European Dialogue, no. 2 (4), pp. 214–241. HSE University.
- D. Mille (2020). Trajectories of Modernization in Russia: Artists Recalibrating the Sensorium. In B. Latour & P. Weibel (Eds.), Critical Zones: The Science and Politics of Landing on Earth. MIT Press. pp. 374–379.
- E. Sarkisian Åkerman (2021). Det kollektiva och det privata minnet: Sokol, Otdelnov och Muromtseva, Konst i ruinerna av en utopi: en analys av nominerade bidrag till Kandinsky- och Innovatsijapriserna 2019/2020 (in Swedish). [The Collective and the Private Memory: Sokol, Otdelnov and Muromtseva part of: Art in the Ruins of a Utopia: An Analysis of Nominated Entries for the Kandinsky and Innovation Prizes]. Uppsala University. pp. 29–35/54.
- R. Wigh Abrahamsson; A. Brutemark; Joosse, S. et al. (2023). IMAGINATIVE POWER: The role of art in environmental communication, Swedish University of Agricultural Sciences. 26 p.
- A. Arutyunyan; A. Egorov (2024). Personal Traces in the Soviet Industrial Aftermath. Pavel Otdelnov's Promzona and Haim Sokol's Paper Memory Exhibitions in Moscow. In F. Guerin & M. Szcześniak (Eds.), Visual culture of post-industrial Europe. Amsterdam University Press. pp. 243–266.
- P. A. Otdelnov (2025). What Does an Industrial Zone Smell Like? The Olfactory Memory of an Industrial Past. In Vektory. Proceedings of the 23rd International Conference of Young Scholars, pp. 22–29. Shaninka.
- T. Mironova (2025). Optics of Documentary: Practices of Working with Memory and History in Contemporary Art. New Literary Observer.
- E. Konyushikhina (2026). From Ruins to Weapons: Post-Soviet Landscapes in Transition. Slavonica. Taylor & Francis. doi:10.1080/13617427.2026.2703372
