= Korund =

Russian chemical company

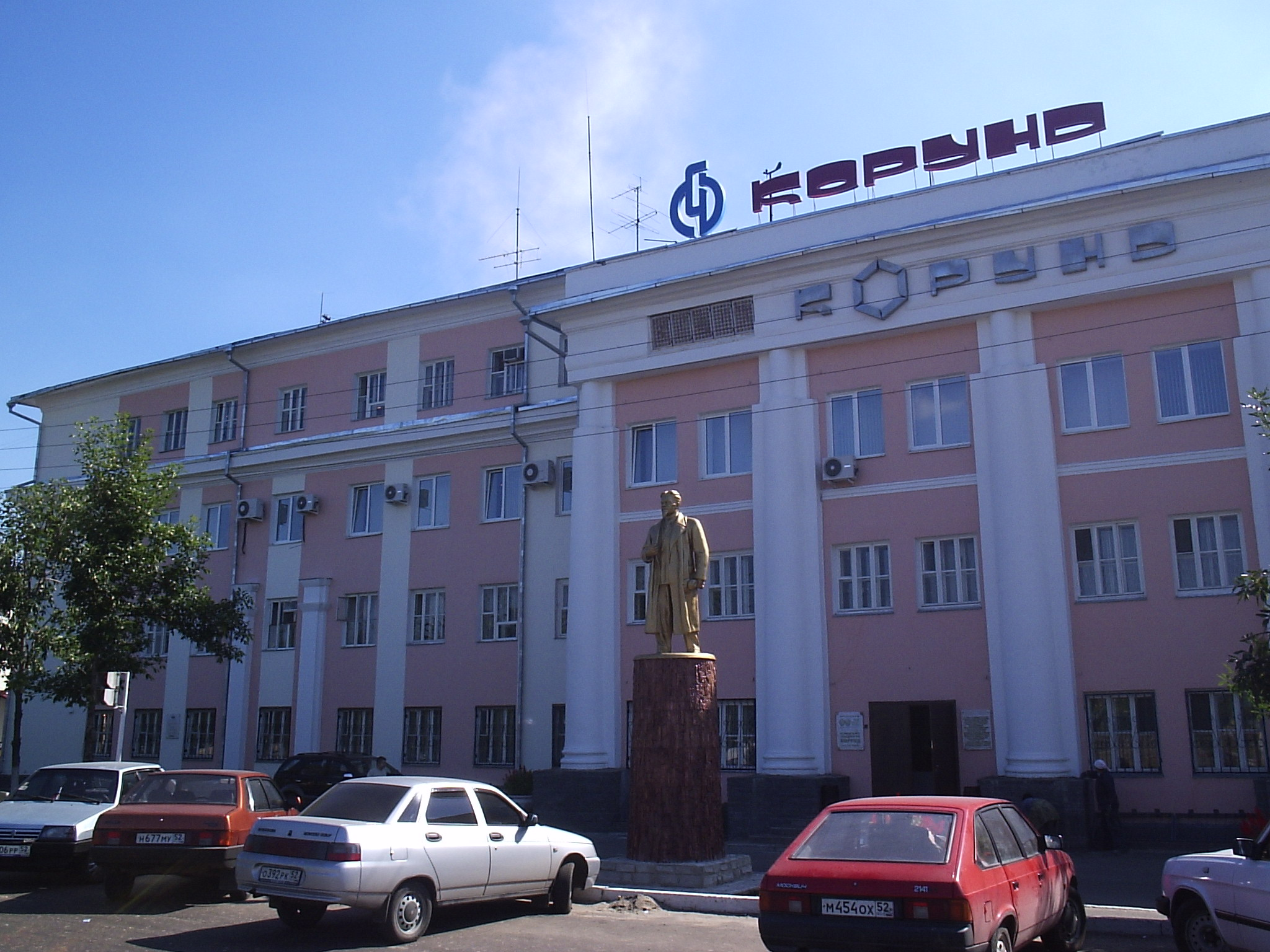
- Native name: ООО «Корунд»
- Type: LLC (Limited Liability Company)
- Founded: 1995
- Key people: Director - Iksanov I. S.
- Website: https://www.korund-nn.ru/

Korund (Russian: ООО «Корунд») is a company based in Dzerzhinsk, Russia. It is part of Petrochemical Holding GmbH.

== History ==
The Korund State Enterprise produces a variety of chemical products for military, industrial, agricultural, and household use. It also produces corundum and articles made of it, as well as an assortment of consumer goods.

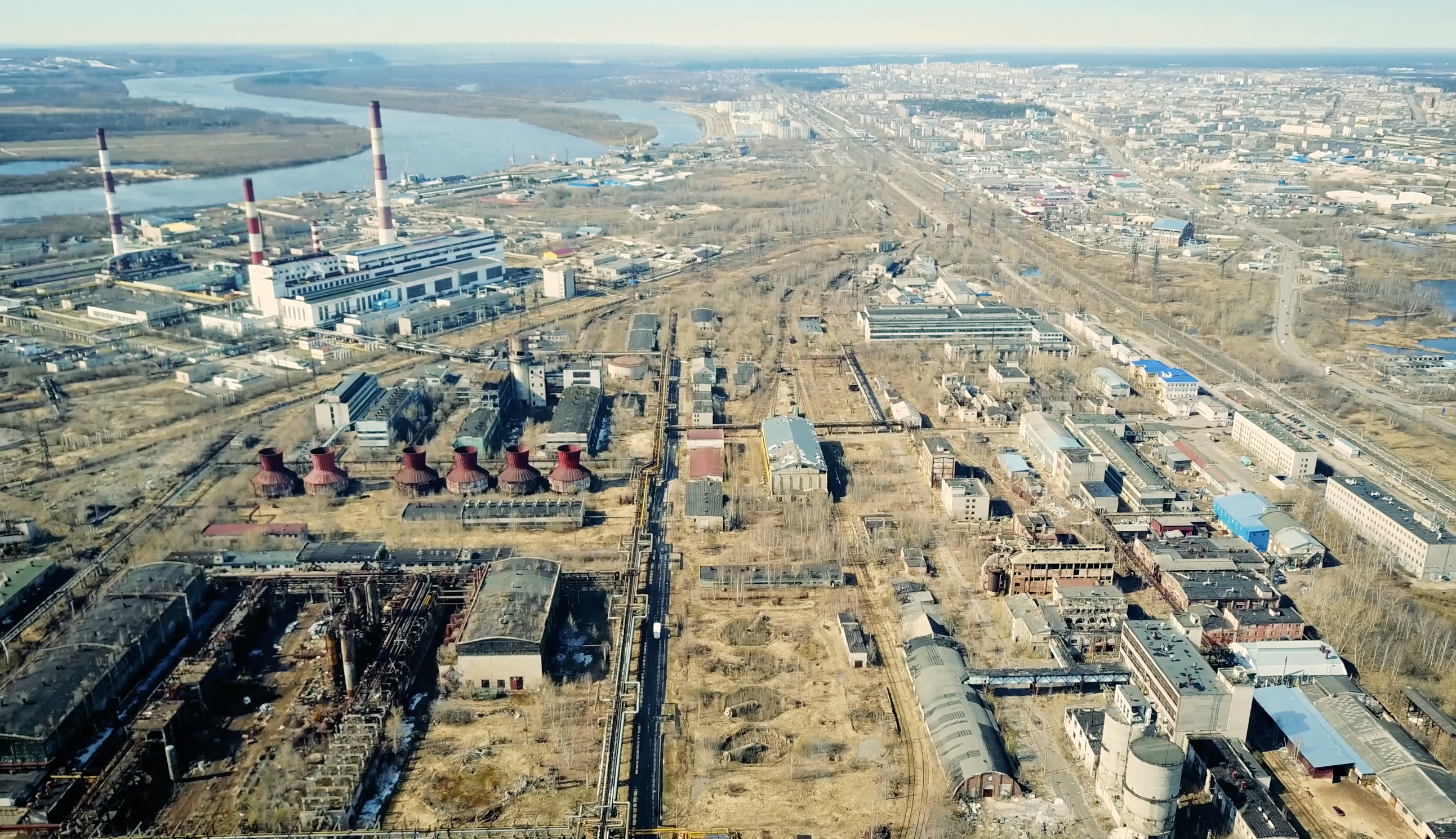
Aerial view of the Korund site, still from the film Chemical Plant by Pavel Otdelnov, 2019

The company was founded on September 25, 1915, as a mineral acid plant. By October 1916 production of sulfur and nitric acid was mastered for the purposes of manufacture with their help of explosives. Since 1920 the factory produces superphosphate.

In 1941, the plant began producing “KS”—an anti-tank, self-igniting liquid—and constructed a workshop for cyanide manufacture to meet the increased demand for cyaniding salts required in the production of armor-grade steel. During the war years, it also commenced production of potassium nitrate (essential for black powder manufacture) and arsenic trichloride.

After the war, the assembly of poison-filled munitions was halted and most of the facilities for their production were gradually dismantled; however, phosgene continued to be manufactured for use as a chemical feedstock.

In the 1950s, the plant synthesized PASK—the first Soviet second-line anti-tuberculosis drug. During this period, it also developed the technology to produce hexachloran and manufactured the first artificial dark-red ruby, alexandrite, sapphire, amethyst, and topaz crystals for the jewelry industry[^source not cited for 2169 days].

It is noted that both during and after the war, basic safety standards were not observed: workshops and adjacent areas were continually contaminated by chemicals, and by 1952 the discharge of polluted wastewater into the Oka River was estimated at 1,700 m³/hour.

== Staff ==
The average number of employees is 67.

Director - Igor Shamilevich Iksanov.

The founders of the company are Igor Shamilevich Iksanov, Andrey Petrovich Zubov, Vladimir Petrovich Zubov.
