= Swedish Press =

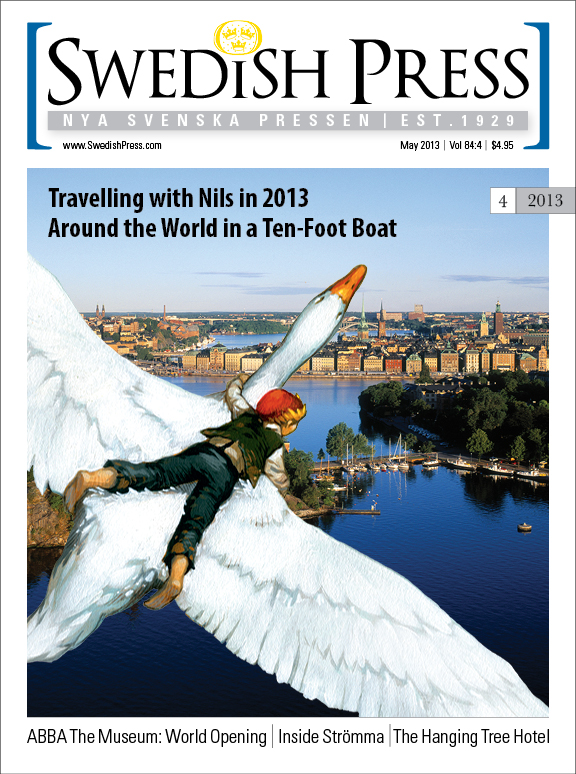
- Swedish Press cover from May 2013 showing Nils Holgersson riding on a goose across Sweden.
- Editor-in-Chief: Kajsa Norman
- Categories: Magazine
- Frequency: 4 issues annually
- Format: 8.0" x 10¾" (203 x 273 mm)
- Publisher: Noelle Norman
- Founder: Helge Ekengren and Paul Johnson
- Founded: 24 January 1929
- Company: Swedish Press Inc.
- Country: Canada
- Based in: Ottawa, ON
- Language: English and Swedish
- Website: www.swedishpress.com
- ISSN: 0839-2323

Swedish Press is North America’s only Swedish quarterly magazine. The readership consists mainly of Swedish expats and Swedish descendants living in Canada and the United States, as well as North American businesses with links to Sweden. It is published 4 times a year. The magazine contains articles in both English and Swedish on subjects related to contemporary events in Sweden, as well as coverage of Swedish traditions and culture. The Swedish Press also features interesting Swedish personalities and companies. The magazine comes in a printed and a digital edition.

== History ==
The only Swedish paper still in existence in Canada, Swedish Press was established in Vancouver in 1929 as the Swedish-language Svenska pressen. It started as a weekly broadsheet at a time when there were hundreds of Swedish newspapers in North America. Today, only the Swedish Press and the Nordstjernan tabloid in New York are left in all of North America. Swedish Press has subscribers in every US state and every Canadian province.

It was two Finland-Swedes, Helge Ekengren and Paul Johnson, who founded Svenska pressen. Ekengren provided space in the same building as his travel agency, and the first issue was dated 24 January 1929. The four-page weekly gave equal space for news from Sweden and Finland. When Ekengren left in 1933, Matt Lindfors became editor, assisted by Rud Månson, who had already worked there for three years.

Financial difficulties dogged Svenska pressen, despite inventive appeals and refinancing schemes. In 1936 Lindfors sold the paper to Seattle’s Svenska posten, which printed his weekly Vancouver page. Less than a year later he took it back and changed the name to Nya svenska pressen (The New Swedish Press). In 1943 it was reorganized as a private company under the name Central Press Limited, having purchased its own printing equipment. A board of directors was elected, and shares were sold to cover capital expenses. At this time Lindfors was busy elsewhere, and Einar Olson took over as editor for five years, followed by Rud Månson until Lindfors returned in 1961.

The paper faced another crisis in 1984 when the editors, professional journalist Jan Fränberg and his wife Vicky, decided to return to Sweden. “The problem,“ lamented Jan, “was that the subscribers were dying.” At this point Nya svenska pressen was one of only five surviving Swedish newspapers on the continent.

While it was true that original subscribers were dying, it was also true that most of their children and grandchildren could not read Swedish and did not have strong feelings towards Sweden. Immigration had virtually halted during the years from 1930 to 1950 because of the Depression, the Second World War, and reconstruction in Canada. When North America became a favored destination once again, many Swedish immigrants had already learned English at school as a compulsory subject. The loss of subscribers, coupled with escalating printing costs, sounded the death knell for hundreds of ethnic newspapers in North America.

Sture Wermee, who had worked as typographer and sometime editor since 1952, was determined that Nya svenska pressen should survive. Along with Swedish consul Ulf Waldén and others, he scouted around for an editor and found Anders and Hamida Neumüller. The couple agreed to try it for a year as a monthly, with the backing of the Swedish Press Society. They switched the name to Swedish Press/Nya svenska pressen, adopted a smart magazine format, and started producing the paper on a Macintosh computer. The Swedish Charitable Association, which raised money through bingos, funded purchase of the new equipment. The first issue came out in January 1986. Continuing to contribute were journalist Ann-Charlotte Berglund, cartoonist Ernie Poignant, and Sven Seaholm, the paper’s poet laureate. New contributors included Mats Thölin with sports, Adele Heilborn with news from Sweden, and Roberta Larson with reports from the Swedish Canadian Rest Home.

Editor Anders Neumüller credited Canada’s multicultural policy and Vancouver’s Expo ’86 with generating enough advertising revenue to see Swedish Press through its critical first year. He also came close to meeting his goal of doubling the number of subscribers.

Since then, Swedish Press has become an international resource, keeping readers informed in an interesting way about happenings in Canada, Sweden, and the United States, very little of which is included in the mainstream media.

History text adapted from Elinor Barr, “Swedes in Canada: Invisible Immigrants,” University Toronto Press 2015 with permission from the author.

== Recent activities ==
At the end of 2012, Claes and Joan Fredriksson purchased Swedish Press from Anders and Hamida Neumüller who retired and moved back to Sweden after a successful run of the magazine for 27 years. Claes and Joan revamped the magazine and began producing a full-colour edition focused on innovation and sustainability.

In 2016, Swedish Press received an award for "Excellence in Editorial Concept Art and Visual Presentation" from the National Ethnic Press and Media Council of Canada.

In 2020, the Fredrikssons decided it was time to pass the torch to someone else. The current owner and Editor-in-Chief is Kajsa Norman based in Ottawa, Ontario.

== Other sources ==
- Backlund, J. Oscar. “A Century of the Swedish American Press,” Swedish American Newspaper Company, Chicago, Illinois 1952
- Howard, Irene. “Vancouver’s Svenskar – A History of the Swedish Community in Vancouver,” Vancouver Historical Society 1970
