= Cargo 200 =

Cargo 200 (Russian: Груз 200, romanized: Gruz 200) may refer to:

- Cargo 200 (code name), code used in the Soviet Union and post-Soviet states to denote the transportation of military fatalities that had eventually become a euphemism for killed in action
- Cargo 200 (film), 2007 Russian thriller
- Cargo 200, a 1999 painting by Pavel Otdelnov
