= Andrei Volkov =

- Андрей Викторович Волков
- Born: August 10, 1948 (age 78); Moscow, USSR
- Education: Stroganov Moscow State Academy of Arts and Industry
- Known for: Painting
- Awards: Gold Medal of the French Academy of Fine Arts (1984)

Andrei Viktorovich Volkov (Russian: Андрей Викторович Волков; born 10 August 1948, Moscow) is a Soviet and Russian painter. He is a full member (academician) of the Russian Academy of Arts (elected corresponding member in 2007 and academician in 2018) and has been a member of the Union of Artists of the USSR since 1979. Volkov is known for urban landscapes, particularly of Moscow, and for a manner the critic Alexander Kamensky called "documentary romanticism". His work is held in the Tretyakov Gallery, the Moscow Museum of Modern Art and the Ludwig Museum, Cologne, among other collections.

== Biography ==
Volkov was born in Moscow. As a child he visited the American National Exhibition held in Sokolniki in 1959 several times. (Note: Recollection drawn from the Russian Wikipedia article.) He finished school in 1966 and entered the Stroganov School, where he studied from 1966 to 1971; during his studies he attended lectures by the architect Heinrich Ludwig, through whom he learned about VKhUTEMAS, the Bauhaus and the Russian avant-garde.

From 1971 Volkov began showing at youth exhibitions, and from 1973 took part in all-Union exhibitions. From 1976 to 1978 he held a fellowship of the Union of Artists of the USSR. In 1979 he was admitted to the Moscow organization of the Union of Artists of the USSR. From the late 1970s he took part in the principal exhibitions of the Union of Artists. From 1980 his work has been held in the collection of the Tretyakov Gallery.

Volkov taught abstract painting in the design department of the Stroganov Academy (2004–2008) and at the Moscow Architectural Institute (2011–2012). He was elected a corresponding member of the Russian Academy of Arts in 2007 and a full member (academician) in 2018.

== Style ==
Up until the 2010s, Volkov worked chiefly in oil. He later started experimenting with various "fleeting" materials, as light as tracing paper and similar media. His recurring subjects are the city, urban light and shade, and the window as a motif; the critic Alexander Kamensky described his manner as "documentary romanticism".

== Awards ==
- Gold Medal of the French Academy of Fine Arts, following the "Traditions and Search" exhibition (Grand Palais, Paris), 1984.
- Prize of the Moscow City Government in the field of literature and the arts, for a series of paintings about Moscow, 1998.
- Silver Medal of the Russian Academy of Arts, 2001.
- "Shuvalov" Medal of the Russian Academy of Arts, 2013.

== Exhibitions ==
- 2021–2022 — The Cool and the Cold. Painting from the USA and the USSR 1960–1990, Gropius Bau, Berlin (September 2021 – January 2022).
- 2020 — Not Forever. 1968–1985, Tretyakov Gallery, Moscow.
- 2020 — Andrei Volkov. Events (Facts, Documents) (solo), Open Club, Moscow.
- 2019 — Time to Sort Things Out, Institute of Russian Realist Art, Moscow.
- 2018 — Music Over the City (solo), exhibition halls of the Russian Academy of Arts, Moscow.
- 2018 — Windows into Russia. Masterpieces of Seven Generations, Institute of Russian Realist Art, Moscow.
- 2017 — 10 Paintings with Their Own Lighting. Lights of the Big City (solo), Open Club, Moscow.
- 2016–2017 — Russia on the Move. By Plane, Train, and Car, Rome (2016) and the Institute of Russian Realist Art, Moscow (2017).
- 2015 — Hyperrealism. When Reality Becomes an Illusion, Tretyakov Gallery, Moscow.
- 2013 — Andrei Volkov. Tracing Paper (solo), Russian Academy of Arts, Moscow.
- 2012 — Green Velvet. Memories of the USSR Union of Artists (curator V. Ginzburg), Open Club, Moscow.
- 2011 — Paper Still Life (solo), Open Club, Moscow.
- 2011 — The Little Brown Button, or Spy Mania (solo), Proun Gallery at Winzavod, Moscow.
- 2009 — Moscow: Light of the Seventies (with S. Lanshakova; curator N. Rebrova), State Literary Museum (17 Trubnikovsky Lane), Moscow.
- 2009 — No News (solo; curator M. Loshak), Proun Gallery at Winzavod, Moscow.
- 2008 — City from the Box (solo; curator K. Bogemskaya), Pushkin State Museum of Fine Arts (Museum of Private Collections), Moscow.
- 2007 — Russian Metaphor, GALILEI Exhibition Centre, Moscow.
- 2007 — Hyperrealism and Its Surroundings, GALILEI Exhibition Centre, Moscow.
- 2006 — A Time of Change. Art of 1960–1985 in the Soviet Union, State Russian Museum, St. Petersburg.
- 2006 — Light in Hall 17, Central House of Artists, Moscow.
- 2005 — Empty Rooms (Pictorial Emptiness) (solo; curator N. Kosolapova), M'ARS Gallery, Moscow.
- 2004 — ArtKlyazma 2004. New Russian Reality (curator O. Lopukhova), ARTklyazma festival, Sorokino.
- 2004 — The City Is My Home (curator N. Avgustinovich), Central House of Artists, Moscow.
- 2003 — A Gradual Transition from Grey to Pink (solo; curator M. Loshak), Moscow Centre of Arts on Neglinnaya, Moscow.
- 2003 — Fragments of the Big City (solo; curator A. Meshcheryakov), WAM Gallery, Moscow.
- 2001 — Light and Shadow (solo; curator S. Karakash), Manege Central Exhibition Hall, Moscow.
- 2001 — Light through the “Sun” Lattice (curator N. Rebrova), State Literary Museum, Moscow.
- 1997 — Moscow Vertical (curator M. Cherepashenets), ROSIZO Exhibition Centre, Moscow.
- 1996 — Osaka Triennale 96, Osaka, Japan.
- 1993 — Joint exhibition of paintings by A. V. Volkov and sculpture by A. N. Volkov, LLD Bank, Moscow.
- 1991 — A Gradual Transition from Light to Dark (solo), Lehmbruck Museum, Duisburg, Germany.
- 1991 — Solo painting exhibition Andrei Volkov, Central House of Artists, Moscow.
- 1986 — Aspects of Contemporary Soviet Art from the Peter and Irene Ludwig Collection, Venice and Rome.
- 1986 — Space in the Service of Peace, All-Union art exhibition marking the 25th anniversary of Yuri Gagarin's flight, Central House of Artists, Moscow.
- 1985 — Biennial of Painting of the Socialist Countries in Szczecin, Szczecin, Poland.
- 1984–1985 — Russische und Sowjetische Kunst — Tradition und Gegenwart. Werke aus sechs Jahrhunderten, Düsseldorf, Stuttgart and Hanover.
- 1984 — Junge Künstler DDR/UdSSR — Für Frieden und Sozialismus, Moscow and Berlin.
- 1984 — Traditions and Search, Grand Palais, Paris.
- 1982–1983 — Vierzig Künstler aus der Sowjetunion, Museum Kunstpalast, Düsseldorf.
- 1982 — All-Union Youth Art Exhibition Youth of the Country, Manege Central Exhibition Hall, Moscow.
- 1982 — Second Exhibition of Fine Art by Young Baltic Artists Youth 82, Vilnius, Lithuania.
- 1982 — Young Soviet Artists of the 1970s, Netherlands.
- 1982 — Russische Malerei heute, Henri Nannen Kunsthandel and Thomas Levy Galerie, Hamburg (touring exhibition: Hamburg, Munich, Düsseldorf, Dortmund, Frankfurt, Wiesbaden, Brussels, Paris, Rome).
- 1981 — Music and the Fine Arts, exhibition at the Union of Artists of the USSR, 10 Gogolevsky Boulevard, Moscow.
- 1981 — Exhibition of Works by 23 Moscow Artists, Central House of Artists, Moscow.
- 1981 — Młoda plastyka radziecka, BWA Galeria Sztuki Współczesnej, Olsztyn, Poland.
- 1981 — Exhibition at the House of Creativity on Lake Senezh, Moscow Region.
- 1980 — The Interior in the Work of Russian and Soviet Artists of the 14th–20th Centuries, Tretyakov Gallery, Moscow.
- 1980 — Exhibition from the On the Stands of “Yunost” series: A. Volkov and A. Petrov, editorial office of Yunost magazine, Moscow.
- 1978 — All-Union Art Exhibition Young Guard of the Land of Soviets, Manege Central Exhibition Hall, Moscow.
- 1978 — Guarding the Borders of Our Motherland, All-Union art exhibition, Moscow.
- 1976 — All-Union Youth Art Exhibition Youth of the Country, Manege Central Exhibition Hall, Moscow.
- 1976 — Russian Tendencies (Russiske Tendenser), Galerie Pierre, Odense, Funen, Denmark.
- 1973 — Sport in the Art of the Young, All-Union art exhibition, Exhibition Hall of the Moscow Union of Artists on Kuznetsky Most, Moscow.

Volkov has also taken part in the Grey-Blue-Green project of the International Confederation of Unions of Artists.

== Collections ==
Volkov's work is held in the Tretyakov Gallery, the Moscow Museum of Modern Art, a number of regional Russian museums, the Ludwig Museum (Cologne) and the National Museum in Szczecin (Poland), as well as in private collections in Germany, the United States and France.

== Family ==
Volkov's father, Viktor Aleksandrovich Volkov (1918–1981), was a petroleum engineer and an Honoured Builder of the USSR who managed the Shchyokingazstroy trust, directed the Giprotruboprovod institute, and served as vice-president of the Soyuzneftegazpererabotka industrial association. His wife, Natalia Seina, is a designer.
