= Pavel Otdelnov =

Russian-British contemporary artist (born 1979)

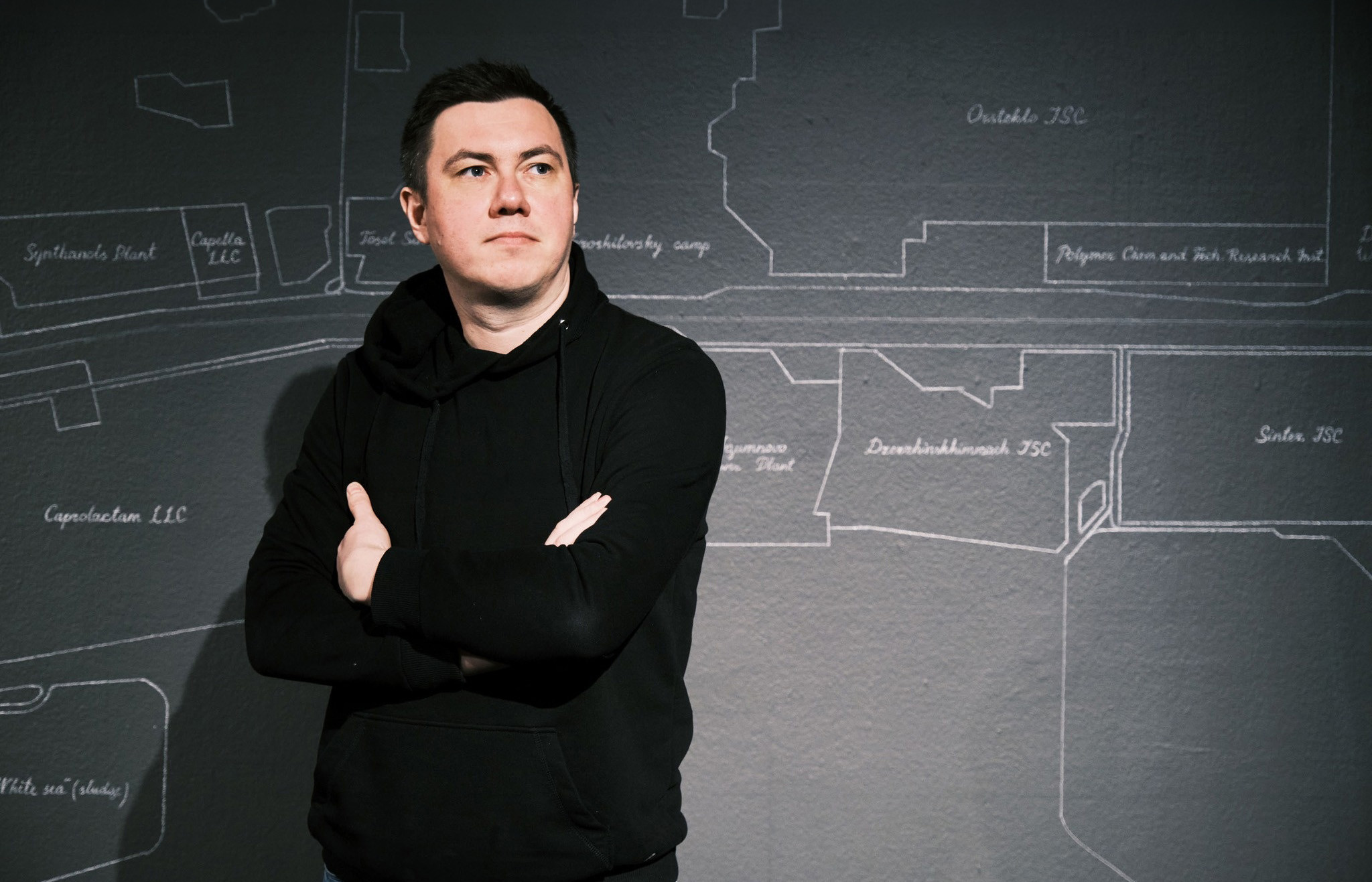
- Pavel Otdelnov at his show. 2022
- Born: Pavel Aleksandrovich Otdelnov; 19 June 1979 (age 47); Dzerzhinsk, Russia
- Education: Surikov Moscow State Academy Art Institute; Joseph Backstein Institute of Contemporary Art
- Known for: Painting; Installation
- Notable work: Inner Degunino (2014), Promzona (2019), Ringing Trace (2021)
- Style: Industrial landscape painting
- Awards: Innovation Art Prize (2020, Promzona); Kandinsky Prize longlist (2015, 2017, 2019; shortlist 2021); Sergey Kuryokhin Contemporary Art Award Special Prize (2017)
- Website: otdelnov.com/en

Pavel Aleksandrovich Otdelnov (Russian: Павел Александрович Отдельнов; born 19 June 1979), is a Russian artist based in London. He works across painting, drawing, video, and installation, examining industrial landscapes, urban space, environmental issues, and the cultural history of the Soviet and post-Soviet periods. Otdelnov's practice draws on archival materials, field research, and personal testimony. His exhibitions are often conceived as site-specific projects that combine painting with text, sound, and found objects. Painting remains central to his practice, often integrated into multimedia installations exploring historical memory and post-industrial transformation.

== Biography ==
Pavel Otdelnov was born in Dzerzhinsk Nizhny Novgorod Region, a major cluster of the Soviet chemical industry. Since the 1930s, the artist's family was employed at local chemical enterprises. Given its industrial background, Dzerzhinsk faced an economic decline and neglect after the collapse of the Soviet Union, which has served as one of the sources of imagery and subject matter for Otdelnov. From 1994 to 1999, Otdelnov studied painting at Nizhny Novgorod Art College with Pavel Rybakov. His early exhibitions included the group show Międzynarodowy Plener Malarski (Sławków, Poland, 1997) and a solo exhibition at the Peter's House exhibition hall in Nizhny Novgorod (1999). His graduation project, Cargo 200, addressed the experience of soldiers returning from the Afghan and Chechen wars. In 1999–2005, Otdelnov studied at Moscow Surikov State Academic Institute of Fine Arts in the Painting Department under the instruction of Pavel Nikonov and Yuri Shishkov. According to Otdelnov, studying in Pavel Nikonov's workshop emphasized artistic risk and independence. Nikonov encouraged students to move beyond repetition and not to fear losing achieved results. Treating them as colleagues, he promoted open discussion and critical thinking. Otdelnov later described the main lesson he learned from Nikonov as the value of inner freedom. In 2005, he presented the graduation project in the form of a Gospel-inspired series. From 2005 to 2007, he was a post-graduate student at Surikov Art Institute. From 2013 to 2015, he studied at the Joseph Backstein Institute of Contemporary Art. In 2022, he relocated to the United Kingdom and has since been living and working in London.

== Style and technique ==
Otdelnov was trained as an academic painter. The curriculum of the art college was based on the study of Socialist realism and placed a strong emphasis on painting from life. His student and early works of 2000s reflect the influence of Pavel Nikonov, Nikolay Andronov, and Andrey Vasnetsov. During this period, his practice was centred on exploring the formal properties of painting – the materiality of pigments, the interplay between surface and depth, and the organisation of compositional structure. In 2009–2010, Otdelnov's artistic vocabulary evolved: his impasto technique became more refined, the pictorial space deepened, and the succession of expressive colour fields, textures, and paint drips was subdued in favour of softer tonal transitions. In 2015, Otdelnov began working with video, and in 2016 he exhibited photographs for the first time. Otdelnov has described painting as a medium intrinsically linked to time. He compares his mode of perception to time-lapse footage, which allows changes in familiar landscapes and everyday life to become visible:

I often wonder: is it possible to see the present time? <...> The reality evades examination, it mimics the mundane, and the familiar, and becomes indistinguishable. I think it is possible to capture the present if you employ the 'slowed-down gaze', like a timelapse. This is how you notice change in the familiar landscapes. Another important tool is temporal distancing, where, in your mind, you build a distance from the object. Thus, at a distance, the novelty is turned into ruins. A painting already has this distance embedded into it because it is rooted in history. The static nature of painting is none other than the freeze-captured duration itself.

— Pavel Otdelnov,

From the mid-2010s onward, Otdelnov began incorporating painting into large-scale installation and research-based projects, including Promzona and Ringing Trace. Within these projects, painting functions alongside video, found objects, archival documents, and immersive environments. Critics have compared his work to that of Gerhard Richter and artists associated with the Düsseldorf School of Photography. Otdelnov has cited influences ranging from nineteenth-century Russian landscape painting to Mario Sironi and Giorgio Morandi. He has also referred to artists such as Semen Faĭbisovich, Mikhail Roginsky, Erik Bulatov, and Cyprien Gaillard.

== Early work ==
=== Combine. Retrospective. 2007—2008 ===
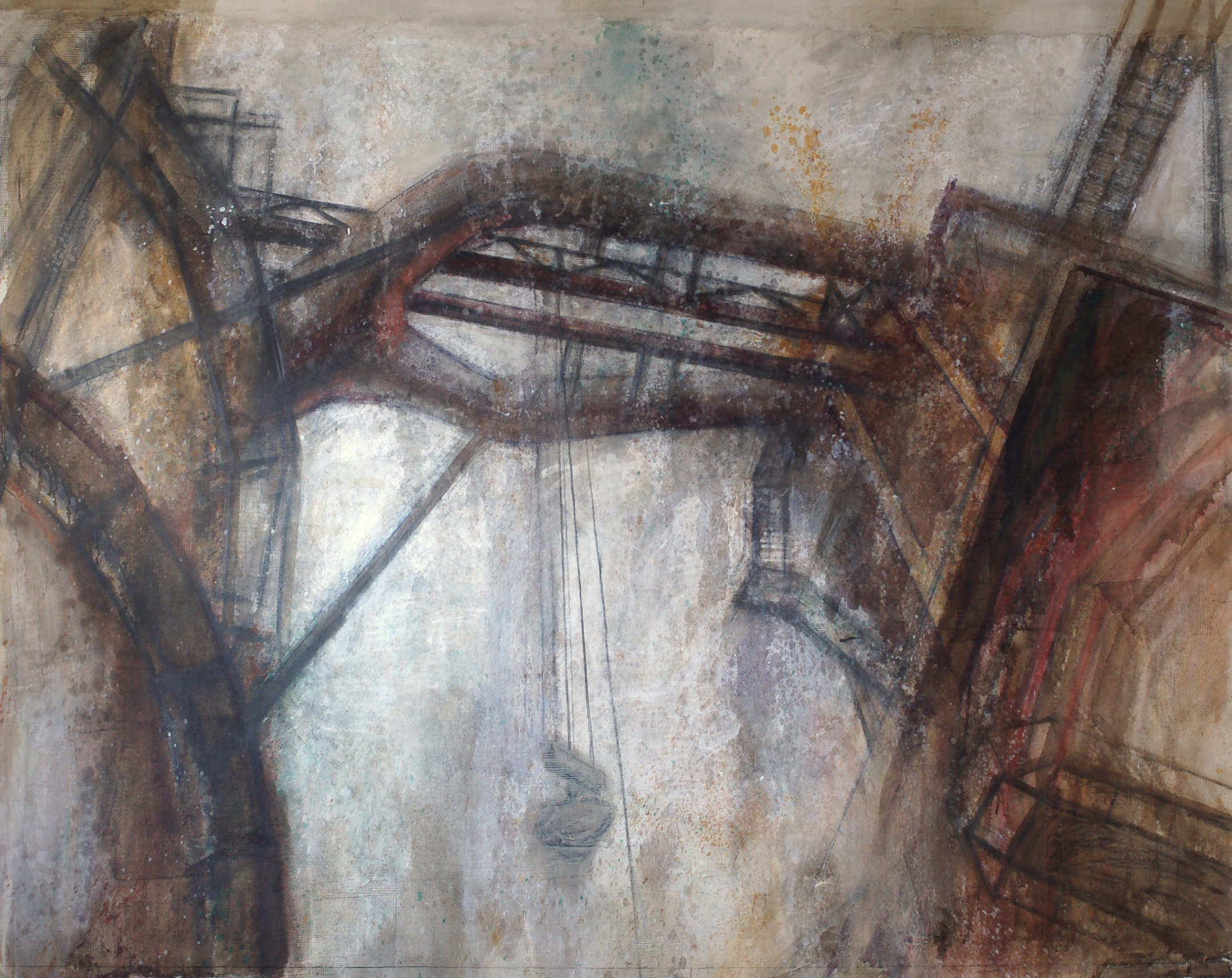
Pavel Otdelnov. Construction. 2008

In 2007, Otdelnov and Egor Plotnikov went on a creative journey to Western Siberia where for two weeks they observed the operations of the Novokuznetsk Iron and Steel Plant and West-Siberian Metal Plant, two industrial behemoths built during the Soviet industrialization. The trip was initiated by Pavel Nikonov as a continuation of the Soviet practice of creative travel assignments. The idea behind this particular trip was to reconceptualize the experience of artists who participated in expeditions to major national construction projects in the 1920s–30s: Alexander Drevin, Aleksandr Labas, Alexander Tyshler, Nadezhda Udaltsova, Alexander Shevchenko, and others. The resulting series of paintings by Otdelnov and Plotnikov based on photos and sketches from the trip were exhibited at Heritage Gallery in May 2012. In Otdelnov's words, that visit to Novokuznetsk enabled a view of the Soviet industrial architecture as ancient ruins, akin to the Baths of Caracalla or a Roman Forum, that apparently achieved reconciliation with the surrounding landscape and became its part.

=== Land. Sky. 2007—2008 ===
In 2007–2008 Otdelnov painted a series of five abstract landscapes where he amalgamated the inflection of the Russian lyrical landscapes from the 19th century and the expressive language of abstract painting. In his LiveJournal, the artist refers to Alexei Savrasov and Mark Rothko as the two main sources for the series Land. Sky. Three of the five landscapes from it were exhibited at Art Sanatorium, an exhibition hosted by the Tretyakov Gallery in 2010. This was Otdelnov's first attempt to present painting as part of an installation. The canvases were hung in a specially constructed isolated room with black walls, an invitation for the viewer to come inside and be surrounded by the acutely familiar Central Russia landscapes.

=== Google Landscapes and Urban Outskirts. 2010 ===
Around the same time, Otdelnov began working with images found on Google Maps or its satellite service (Highway II, 2010; the Color Fields series, 2010). Here, he seeks to contemplate the landscape from a removed perspective, whereby the computer screen acts as a filter to set a certain distance between the landscape and the artist. One of the notable influences on Otdelnov at the time was the Godfrey Reggio movie Koyaanisqatsi, with a minimalist score composed by Philip Glass .

In his works from the turn of the 2000s and 2010s — Land. Sky, Color Fields, Neon Landscape — the artist explored the boundary between abstract and figurative art, virtual and real spaces: he worked with Google Maps and represented real places through the lens of American abstract expressionism. But then the desolation of the technique transformed into the subject of his paintings, and the landscapes became not just inaccessible or seen from the outside, but piercingly uninhabited, abandoned. Yet it is not the past that is abandoned, but the fragile, ephemeral future.

— Irina Kulik,

In the 2010s the artist lived in Khimki near Moscow and travelled to his studio in the capital every day. During his commute, Otdelnov was able to take in the landscapes of the Moscow outskirts and spent his weekend wandering around residential areas or the big waste dump not far from his home. These observation practices resulted in the series titled Metro, 2009–2010; In Motion, 2010; and the painting Desert, 2010, where the artist addresses for the first time the motifs central to his subsequent art: the urban outskirts, landfills, and abandoned plots.

=== Neon Landscape. 2012 ===
In the fall of 2012, Otdelnov had his first solo show in Moscow where he presented the painting series Neon Landscape (Agency. Art Ru Gallery). The paintings made in oil on canvas and on wood focused on the exploration of the nature of light. The setting of choice was airport terminals, passageways and runways, metro stations, and highways, and the main protagonist was artificial lighting – coalescing into lines that are usually disregarded as background and remain unseen, even if they actually guide our movement through urban space.

== Urban Outskirts and Non-places ==
=== Inner Degunino. 2013—2014 ===
In 2013, Otdelnov began the series Inner Degunino, where he depicts Moscow's residential areas and draws inspiration from the Zapadnoye Degunino District, situated near the Moscow Ring Road, comprising mostly industrial facilities and pre-fab mass housing of type P-44. According to the artist, his aim was to "construct an image of the modern Russian landscape, uncover the features of our time usually unseen through the habitual optics. This is primarily about the deserted post-Soviet landscapes, with their power transmission lines stretching into the void, with the ubiquitous pre-fab panel housing, and the gloomy sky." The author's take on the architecture of residential areas with spot inclusions of industrial plants across the endless snowy expanse drew the attention of David Elliott, a curator of the 4th Moscow International Biennale for Young Art, which then featured Otdelnov's paintings at the Biennale in the summer of 2014. The exposition garnered high praise from art critics and culture correspondents. In October 2014, Otdelnov exhibited the completed Inner Degunino series at a solo show at the Moscow Museum of Modern Art. Inner Degunino was featured in the top 50 most prominent art projects of 2014 according to the editorial board of AroundArt; was ranked 3rd in the readership survey for the best exhibition; and was nominated in 2015 for the Kandinsky Prize in the Project of the Year category. The image of the artist's painting Ark from the Inner Degunino project was used in 2014 on the album cover for a Nizhny Novgorod band, KernHerbst, where the artist's brother Leonid Otdelnov is a member

What Pavel Otdelnov puts in oil on canvas is that what we are used to pass or drive by as quickly as possible, that is, the industrial facilities, power plant smokestacks, and other ungainly features of the Russian landscape. The artist is not as much interested in form as he is interested in space. He peers into the familiar landscape, peels off all that is superfluous – namely the people and the vehicles – to make, say, an overpass stretching beyond the horizon into an object lost somewhere in the coldness of outer space.

— Alexandra Shestakova,

In 2013–2014, Pavel Otdelnov painted a series entitled "Inner Degunino," dedicated to the outskirts of Moscow: bastions of residential areas in the midst of wastelands that never became cities. The title refers to Inner Mongolia (an autonomous region in northern China) for a reason—the imagination fills in the endless steppes stretching around the high-rise fortresses. The landscapes of "Inner Degunino," which can hardly be called urban, look like a familiar picture of a "dark future" from the movies. But we are talking about a Utopian project that has degenerated into a dystopia.

— Irina Kulik,

=== Mall. 2015—2016 ===
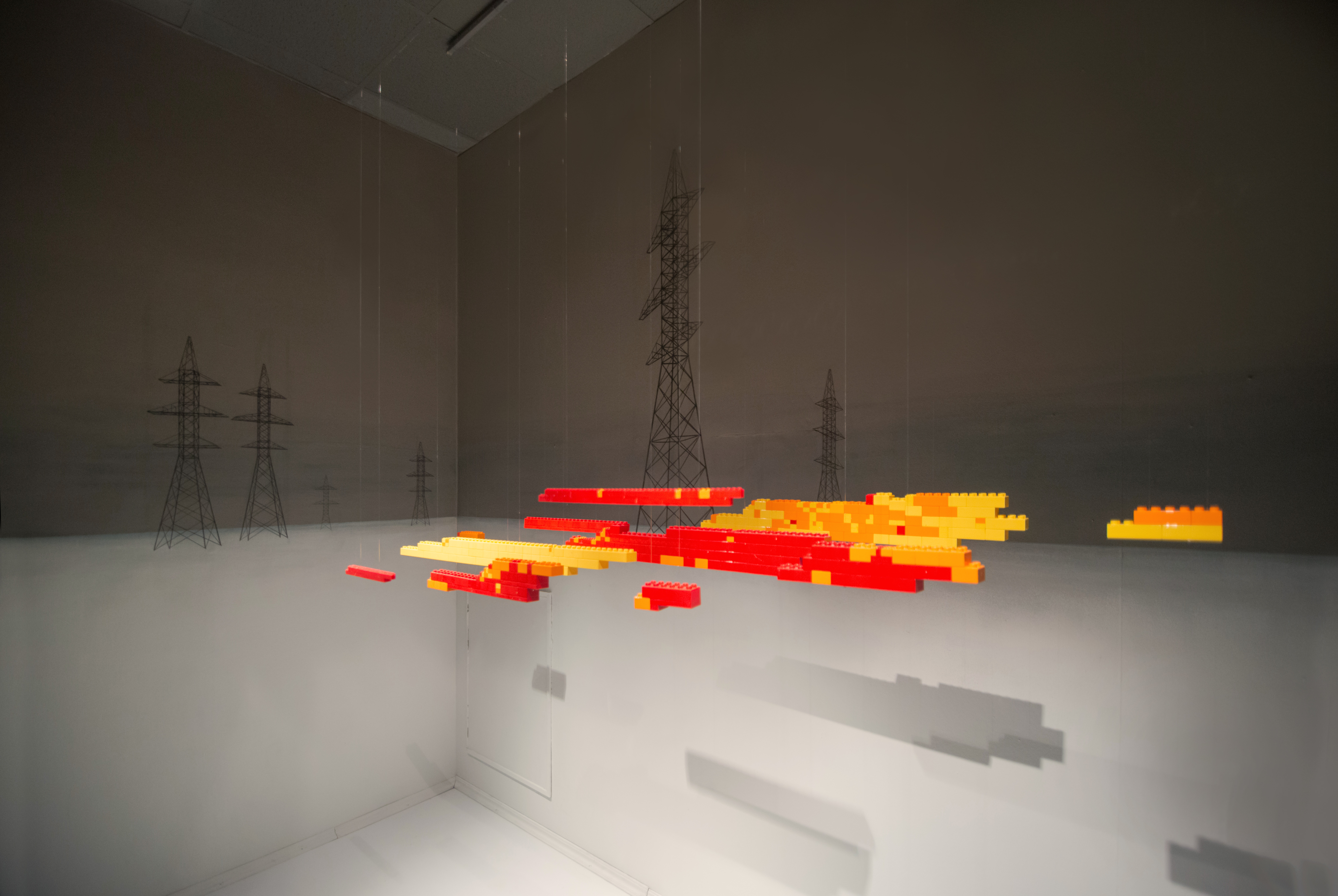
Pavel Otdelnov. Mall. Lego. 2015

Otdelnov continued to explore the subject of post-Soviet urban outskirts in his project Mall, dedicated to the shopping centers that emerged around residential areas of Russian cities in the well-off "noughties". The artist depicts the bright boxes of malls surrounded by decrepit pre-fab panel houses as if they were glitches — visual artifacts caused by a software error. The Mall was exhibited at Triumph Gallery in late 2015. The preface to the exhibition gives the artist's own account of why he turned to glitches:

These innumerable shopping centers crop up next to residential and industrial areas <...> Then this mall, plopped into the endless expanse of our country and among the post-Soviet micro-districts and garages, is very similar to a computer error, a program failure, a glitch. One of the more common causes of glitches is the mismatch between the software's purpose and the task executed by the user. A "glitched-out" mall can be described as a metaphor for the disconnect between the post-Soviet reality and the market relations within emerging capitalism, <...> an unstable event in the stable space.

— Pavel Otdelnov,

A year later, in November 2016, the exhibition Mall. The Time of Colorful Sheds was organized as part of the Non-Places Programme run by the Department of Research Art and hosted by the Smena Center of Contemporary Culture in Kazan. In 2015, Otdelnov's contemplations on the notion of glitches in the post-Soviet landscape were presented at two other exhibition projects. In July 2015, he made a total installation for the exhibition Piece of Space Traversed by Mind at the New Wing of Gogol Museum on Nikitsky Boulevard: he painted a monochrome landscape on the walls with a snow field, gray sky, and power transmission line pylons, and the "glitch" was manifested in Lego bricks suspended on thin wire. In 2015, Otdelnov also participated in Expanding Space. Artistic Practice in the Urban Environment, a project aimed at creative exploration of contemporary phenomena and features of Moscow, organized by V-A-C Foundation. Otdelnov proposed a large-scale object constructed with bright composite panels to be installed next to the Moscow Ring Road near the 81st kilometer. It employed the parallax effect to make the structure seem stably whole from one vantage point but, as the perspective shifts, to disintegrate into parts becoming fluid and unstable. This piece was meant to imitate abandoned or uncompleted mall projects that look like a disruption in the landscape and, at the same time, symbolize the volatility in the economy.

Filled with emptiness, the urban-and-industrial landscapes of residential outskirts, introduced earlier in the artist's previous series Inner Degunino and now recognized as Otdelnov's signature visual subject, are invaded by colorful pixels in the new batch of works <...> The familiar urban objects in Otdelnov's landscapes invite the viewer in, into the depth of slushy plains where pre-fab residential towers and power grid pilons stand high. Yet, this apparent depth in cold grays is broken up sporadically, falling apart into colorful pixels, telling us that the entirety of perceived reality is illusory. We are not really in Degunino but just watching a report from there.

— Konstantin Zatsepin,

=== Russian Nowhere. 2020—2021 ===
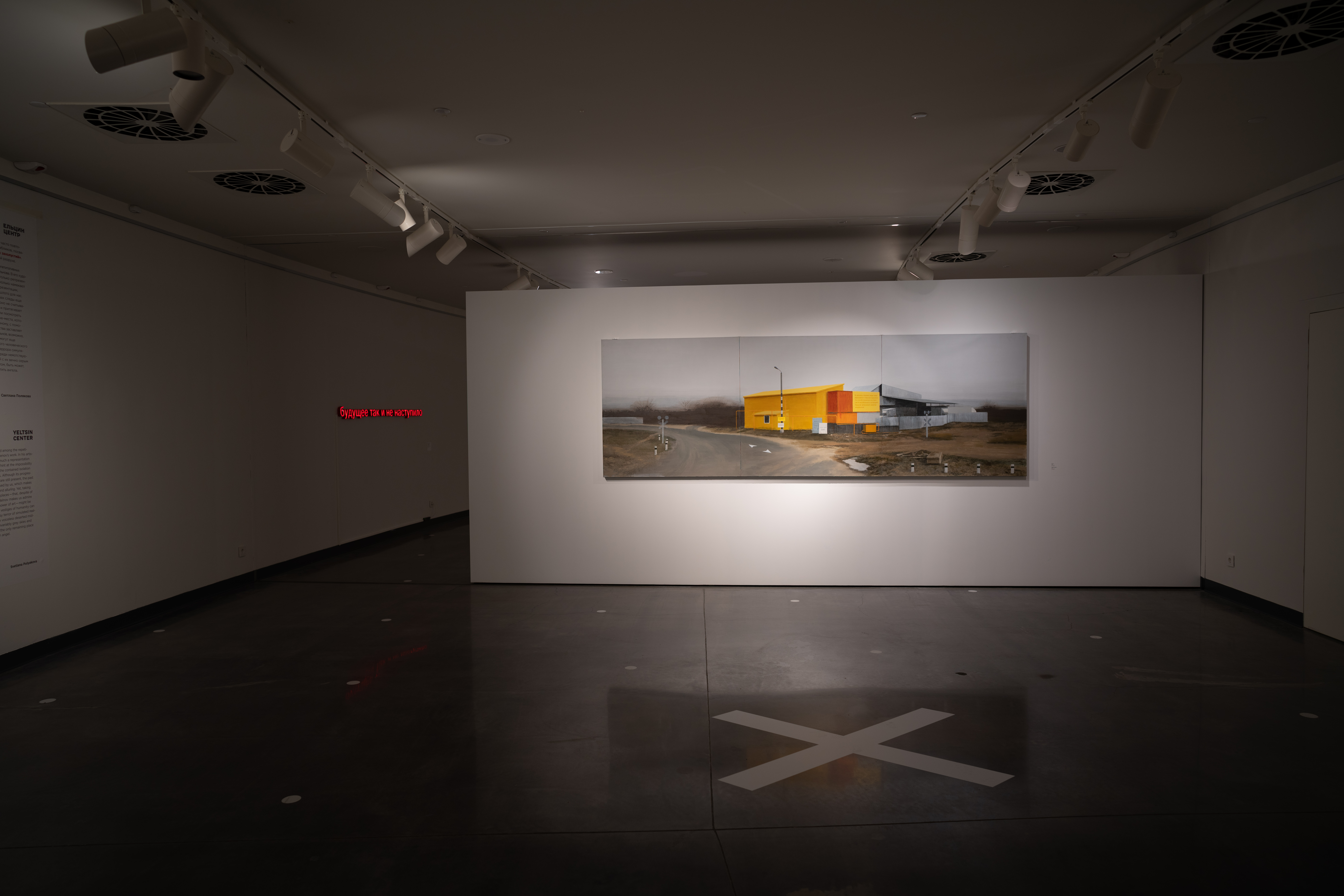
Russian Nowhere. Exhibition view. 2021

The next project by Otdelnov that addressed the subject of post-Soviet wastelands and non-places was the Russian Nowhere, exhibited at Triumph Gallery in 2021. The artist searched for imagery by travelling the country through Yandex and Google Street View. For the paintings, he chose the most banal and typical images that could be taken anywhere in Russia. Next to the landscapes, Otdelnov placed illuminated red-letter signs, fashioned after the ubiquitous shop signage. The sign texts were borrowed from online comments in such social media communities as The Beauty Of Blight, Birch Tree, Russian Death, etc. Philosopher Svetlana Polyakova noted the extreme degree of dehumanization in the landscapes of this series:

In Russian Nowhere, Pavel Otdelnov has aptly captured this recently emergent phenomenon in the collective sensibility of dealing with the loss of the future as a human project. A person is not a project of their own anymore, the person has now denounced the myths, which used to hold power over us, of being the architect of our own futures. The initiative now lies with non-human actors: the natural entropy that prevails and erases from the face of the earth the remains of grand social utopias, the onslaught of new deadly viruses brought about by the environmental disaster, the menacing self-animation of technology.

— Svetlana Polyakova,

Pavel Otdelnov is aware that direct replication of reality is impossible, so he uses another optic – machine vision and collective human intelligence. This typifies his work as post-conceptualism. Turning to landscapes that are no longer used or populated, the artist reaffirms their existence and proposes to define them based on negation. Although these places actually exist, their description or identification, even supported by an accurate image, is not possible. This "nowhere" is in fact everywhere, emerging from the void, which is, in the end, the main character in Otdelnov's work.

— Marina Bobyleva,

Following the exhibition at Triumph, the project was shown at the Yeltsin Centre in Yekaterinburg. In 2021, The Village, an online media outlet, reported on a new coinage Otdelnovesque — referring to the state of alienation and despondency.

== Environmental issues ==
=== Sand and Landscapes of the Kazanka River Floodplain. 2016—2017 ===
In 2016, as part of the Non-Places Program run by the Department of Research Art, an interdisciplinary project in Moscow, Otdelnov went to Kazan for a residency at the Smena Center of Contemporary Culture. He met local environmental experts and activists who were trying to counter planned construction projects in the Kazanka River floodplain. While in residency, he shot the film Sand and painted landscapes of the Kazanka River .

=== Psychozoic Era. 2018—2019 ===
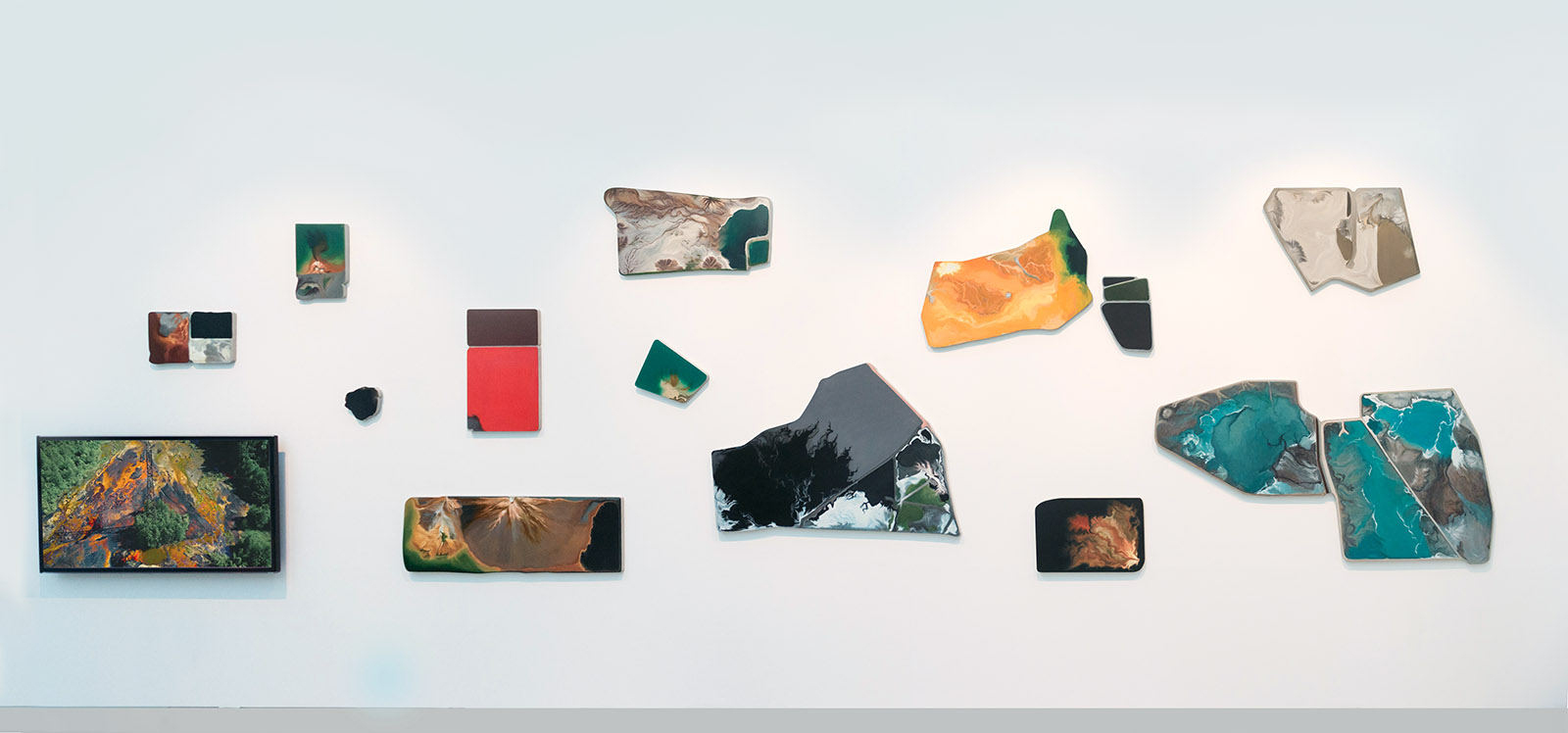
Pavel Otdelnov. Psychozoic Era. 2018

In 2018, Otdelnov further explored the environmental issues in a new film and installation, titled collectively the Psychozoic Era. The project depicted Russian industrial waste storage facilities and their impacts on the environment and people.

Within the framework of the environmental agenda, Pavel Otdelnov's oeuvre is in line with the concept of ‘novel ecosystems’ – human-modified landscapes that crossed a threshold making it difficult to return to their original state. The Psychozoic Era project, shown at the exhibition, addresses human–environment interaction and changes in the landscape, which are usually invisible from the Earth's surface to the naked eye. The artist finds reservoirs for industrial waste disposal using satellite images and collects information on the impact of these facilities on the everyday life and recreational activities of the residents.

— Yulia Aksenova,

=== Shitty Sea. 2019—2020 ===
In 2020, within the frames of the 8th Moscow International Biennale of Contemporary Art, Otdelnov made Shitty Sea, a project exploring the challenges of collection, sorting, and recycling of waste, as well as the problem of the ever-proliferating landfills around Moscow. The artist planted GPS beacons into garbage bags and threw them out in different parts of Moscow to track their movements. Eventually, he visited the municipal landfills and waste sorting facilities where they ended up. The process and outcomes of this research are presented in the film The Trash Trip (2019), the paintings Landfill Aleksandrov and Landfill Timokhovo (2019), MSW (2020), Rubbish and Waste Sorting (2020). To gain a deeper insight into waste sorting, Otdelnov took a job at one such facility. An account of his observations and conversations with other sorting workers are recorded in The Waste Sorter's Diary.

== Research projects ==
=== Promzona. 2015—2020 ===
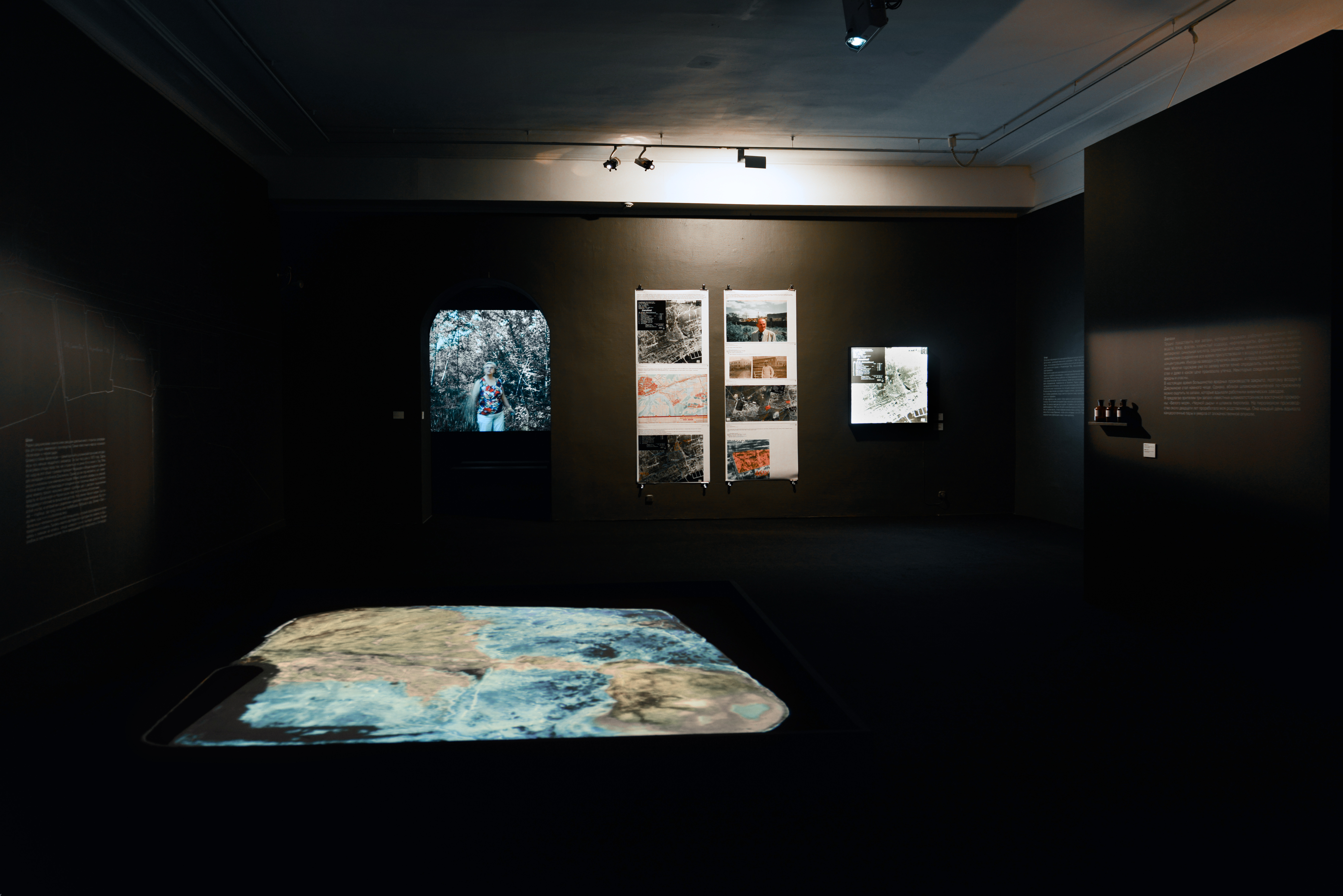
Promzona. Exhibition view. 2019

Promzona (Industrial Zone) is a project about the industrial landscape of Dzerzhinsk and the memory of the Soviet past. Through the history of his hometown and his own family, Pavel Otdelnov examines how the legacy of Soviet industry continues to shape the landscapes, memories, and identities of those who lived within it. The project brings together painting, photography, archival research, documentary materials, and found objects. It explores abandoned factories, restricted industrial zones, workers’ settlements, and family archives, examining how a former industrial world survives in the landscape and in personal memory. As part of the project, No Entry Without Gas Mask!, a book of memoirs written by the artist’s father Aleksandr Otdelnov, was published.

=== Ringing Trace. 2021 ===
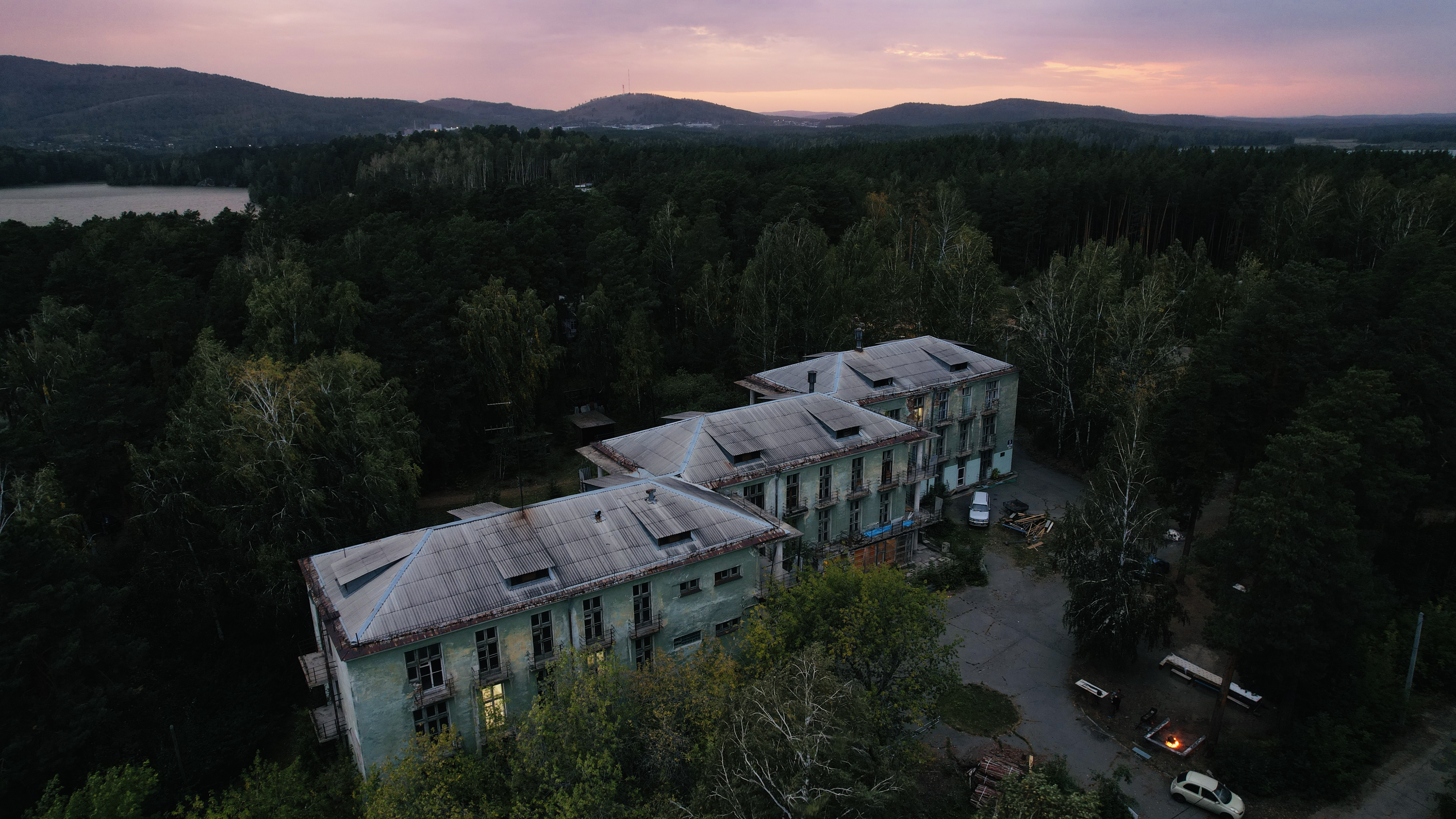
The dorm building of the former secret Laboratory B in Sungulʹ

In the fall of 2021, invited by the Ural Industrial Biennale of Contemporary Art, Otdelnov created a project about the history of the nuclear industry in the Southern Urals. The project was exhibited at the former dormitory of the secret Laboratory B in the village of Sokol, Chelyabinsk Region. During the Soviet time, the lab studied radiobiology, but over the recent few decades, the dorms have been vacant and in disrepair. The artist structured the exposition as a parallel alternative to that of a local history museum. Alongside the newly created paintings, the exhibits included found documents and records, which resonated deeply with Pavel. Each of the 21 rooms in the exhibition narrates the different aspects of the history of the nuclear industry: the invention of the atomic bomb, the 1957 explosion at the Mayak Facility and its liquidators, the Chelyabinsk radioactive trace and the villages that it killed, the secret lingo of nuclear scientists and the daily life in closed towns, the poisoned Techa River, which had been receiving dumps of heavy radioactive waste in 1949–1956 while the riverside population continued to use its water. The project was deemed a success by both the audience and critics and recognized as one of the best at the Biennale. Despite its remote location, the exposition was visited by many people from all across Russia, and upon completion of the Biennale program, it was decided to make the exhibit permanent. The exposition became officially permanent in 2022.

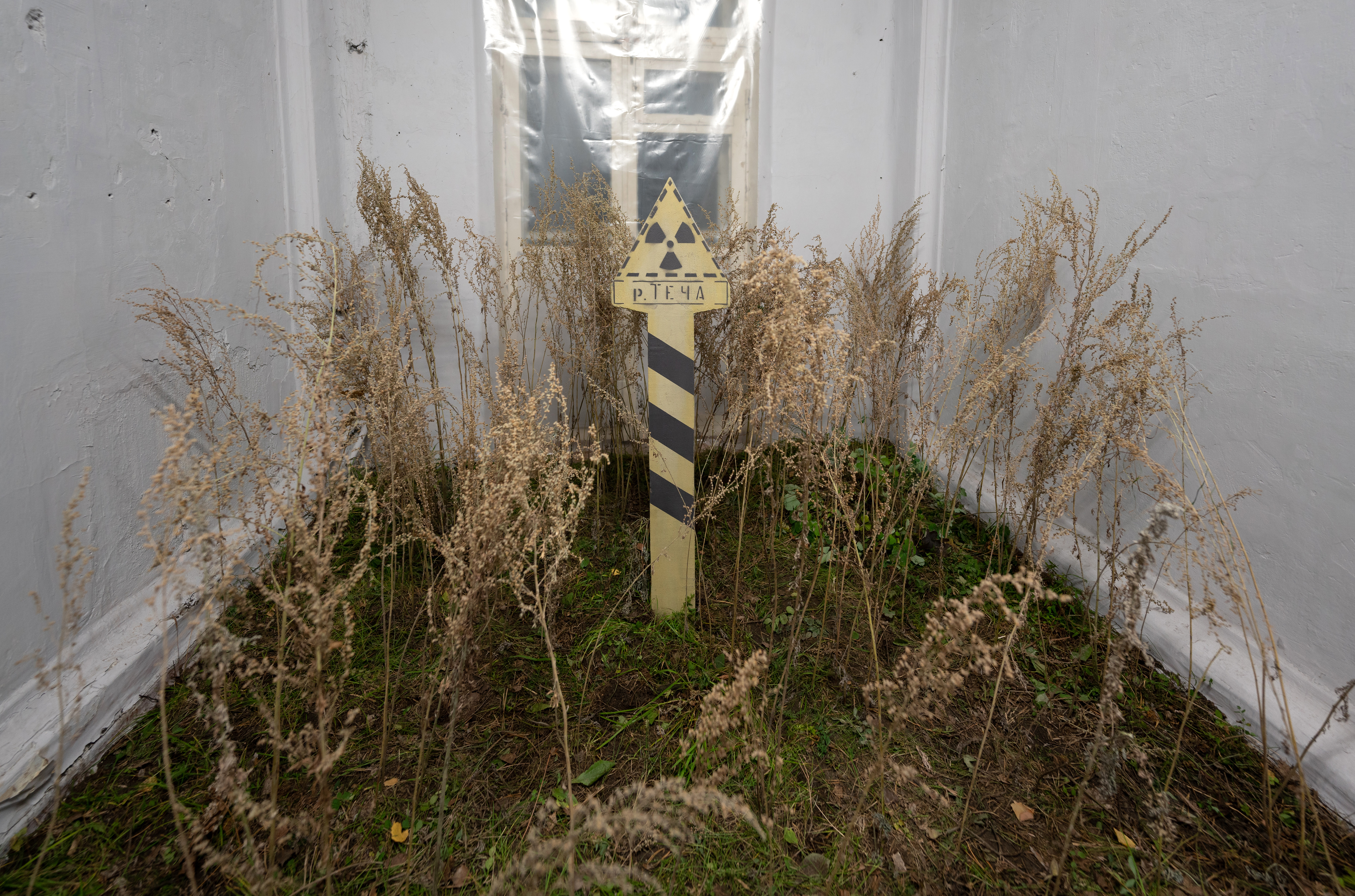
Pavel Otdelnov. Techa. 2021

Canvases, almost indistinguishable against the backdrop of peeling walls, resemble portraits of residents of resettled villages with faces erased, just as their history has been erased; found objects <...>; found texts, <...> light installations – all together they form an epic about the Soviet restless and inhuman atom. <...> different voices merge into what, following Stasov, can be called a contemporary ‘choral picture,’ a polyphonic panorama of totalitarianism, militarism, and colonialism, destroying man and nature. Dramatically and intonationally flawless, the panorama, implanted in the dormitory of the pioneers of the atomic project, leaves an indelible, resonant mark on the soul. <...> the constructivist building in the village of Sokol has turned into a chapel of uncomfortable memories. And although its windows are covered with laboratory polyethylene, it seems that each one offers a view of a new, post-totalitarian and post-industrial Vladimirka, a comparison with which suggests itself.

— Anna Tolstova,

=== Hometown. 2024 ===
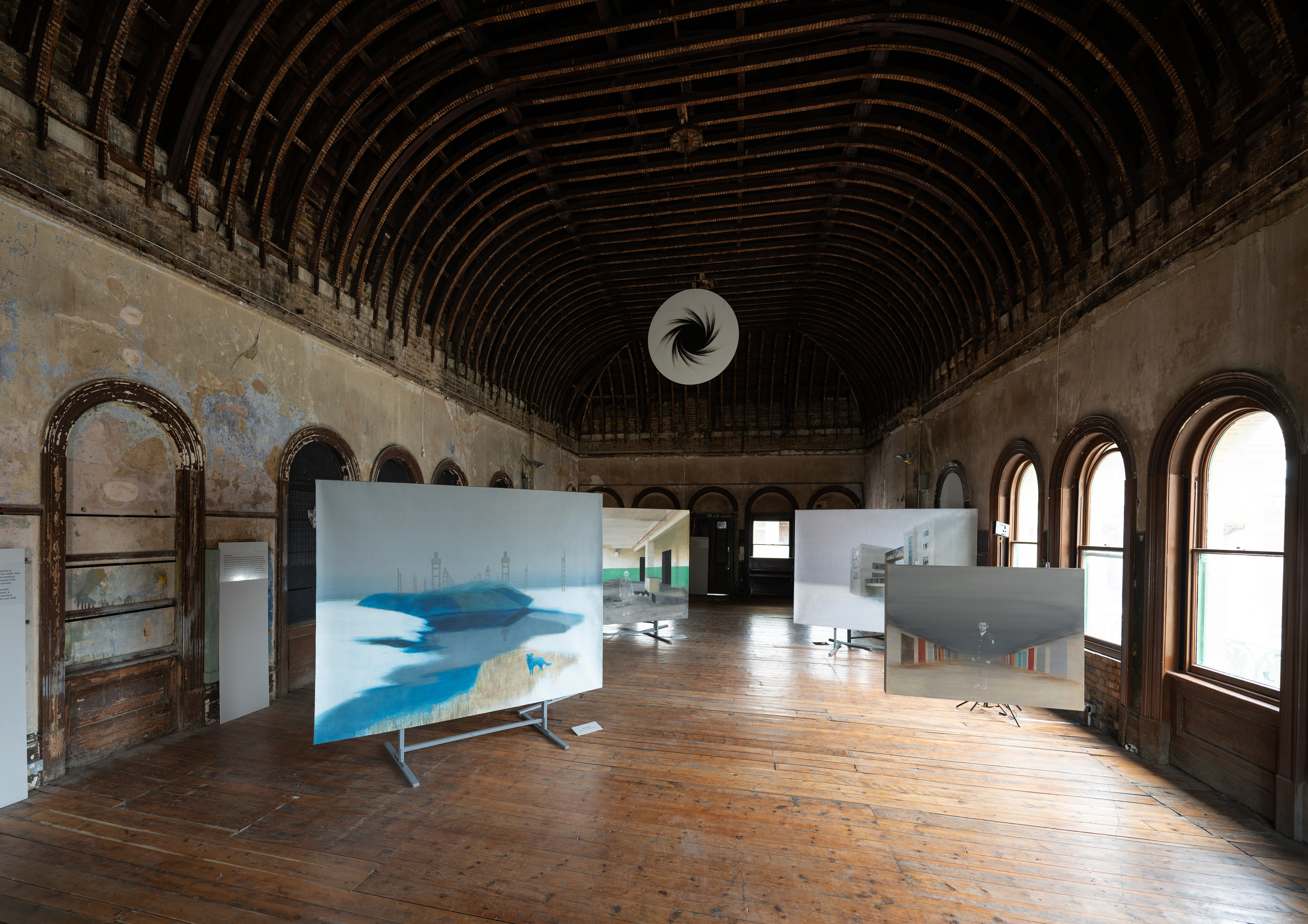
Hometown, The Old Waiting Room. 2024

Hometown is an exhibition project by Otdelnov, shown in June 2024 in the abandoned Old Waiting Room of Peckham Rye railway station in London. The project is dedicated to the artist's hometown of Dzerzhinsk, a former centre of the Soviet chemical industry that still has factories involved in munitions production. In a series of large-scale paintings, Otdelnov depicts industrial landscapes, the environmental impact of chemical production, local crime, family history, and ghost-like figures of the city's residents, combining personal and collective memory with visual images of decline and change. The architecture of the Old Waiting Room was integrated into the exhibition as part of the installation, creating the feeling of a "ghost place". The project reflects the historical and social development of Dzerzhinsk and continues his earlier project Promzona. The exhibition received press attention as an example of artistic reflection on post-Soviet industrial cities and their social and environmental problems.

The youthful Otdelnov in his school uniform, his grandmother—the factory worker and matriarch of a ‘labor dynasty’—and the collective portrait of archetypal provincial riffraff, all surface. The personal and the local converge in a lexicon of metaphors, the full grasp of which is veiled by a certain reticence and the artist's detachment from absolute theories and concepts. The experiment of reconstruction within The Hometown extends beyond the confines of a specific place and evolves into a more universal narrative, where an individual's stance in the modern world is marked by an all-encompassing sense of global uncertainty.

— Il Gurn,

=== A Child in Time. 2025 ===
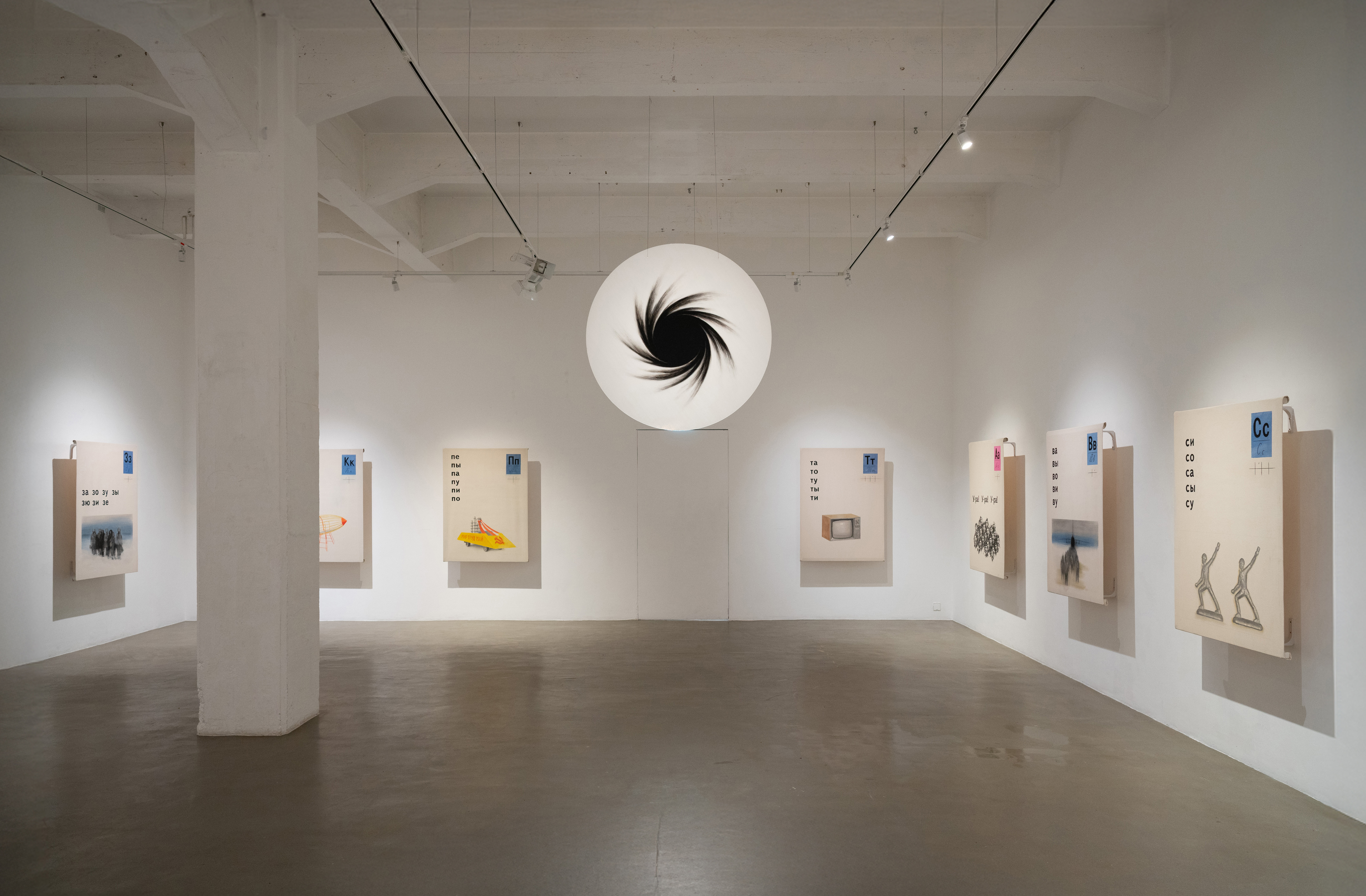
A Child in Time. A.P.T. Gallery. 2025

A Child in Time is a solo exhibition by Pavel Otdelnov held in 2025 at A.P.T. Gallery in London. The project extends the inquiry of Hometown into the subject of Soviet childhood in the 1980s and the period of Perestroika. It focuses on the experience of growing up during a time of ideological transformation and instability, marked by rationing, the perceived threat of nuclear war, and the aftermath of the Chernobyl disaster. The exhibition is structured around several thematic strands, including Primer and Television. In the Primer series, Otdelnov reinterprets the structure of the Soviet school alphabet book, replacing its didactic imagery with motifs associated with childhood anxiety and fear. The Television works draw on imagery from Soviet broadcasts, including the children's programme Good Night, Little Ones!, the news programme Vremya, and televised sessions of Anatoly Kashpirovsky. Through these references, the project examines the role of mass media and educational imagery in shaping collective consciousness and memory in late Soviet society. The project has been discussed in relation to contemporary concerns about censorship, surveillance and ideological control in the Russian art scene.

=== Estates: Fragile Utopia. 2026 ===
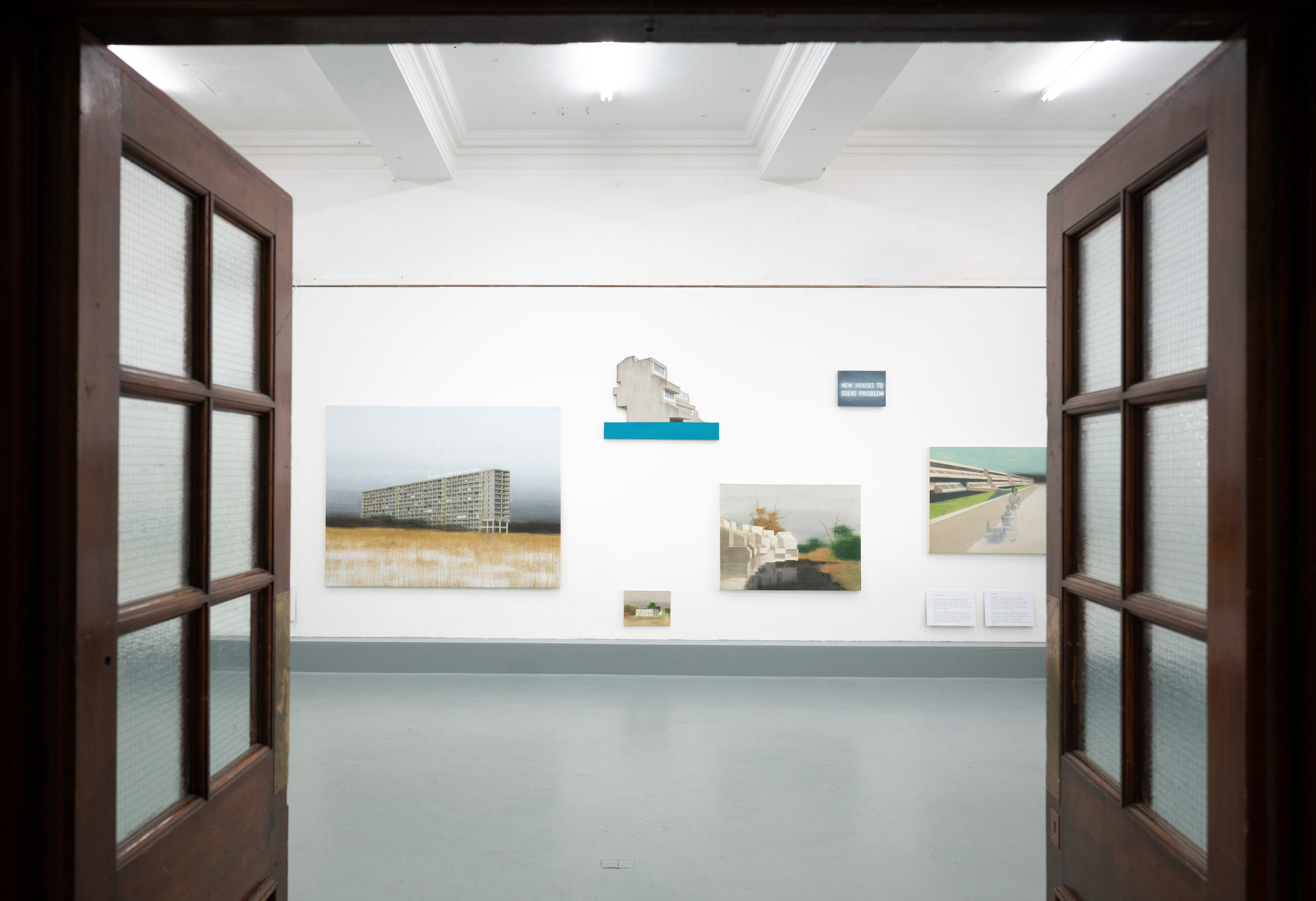
Estates: Fragile Utopia. Lewisham Arthouse. 2026

Estates: Fragile Utopia explores council estates as material remnants of post-war ideas about welfare, collective responsibility and social equality, situating them within a broader history of twentieth-century modernist urban planning. Drawing on research into the work of Patrick Abercrombie and Geoffrey Jellicoe, as well as housing developments including the Aylesbury Estate, Robin Hood Gardens and Thamesmead, Otdelnov considers architecture as a carrier of political and social ideals. The project relates British post-war housing to parallel histories of mass housing in the Soviet Union while emphasising the differences between the two contexts, using the artist's dual perspective to place British estates within a wider transnational history of modernist utopian thought. Through paintings based on contemporary observation and historical research, the series reflects on the legacy of post-war housing policy and its relationship to the present-day housing crisis.

== War, Trauma and Memory ==
=== Unheimlich. 2015—2024 ===
In 2015, for the exhibition War Museum at the Moscow Museum of Modern Art, Otdelnov created the installation Unheimlich. The work recreated a domestic interior into which subtle references to war were inserted, including a toy tank and armed figures hidden within the carpet pattern. The project referred to Freud’s concept of the "unheimlich" and to Martha Rosler's series Bring the War Home. In the same context, Otdelnov produced photographic collages juxtaposing private interiors with images of war-damaged cities in the Donetsk Region, as well as the painting No Flights Today (2015). In 2023, Otdelnov revisited Unheimlich and produced a new version of the installation, which was presented as part of the series of exhibitions Brainwashing Machine. This updated version continued to explore the intimate intersections of domestic spaces and the pervasive presence of war, reflecting his ongoing engagement with memory, trauma, and the absurdity of conflict.

=== Acting Out. 2022 ===
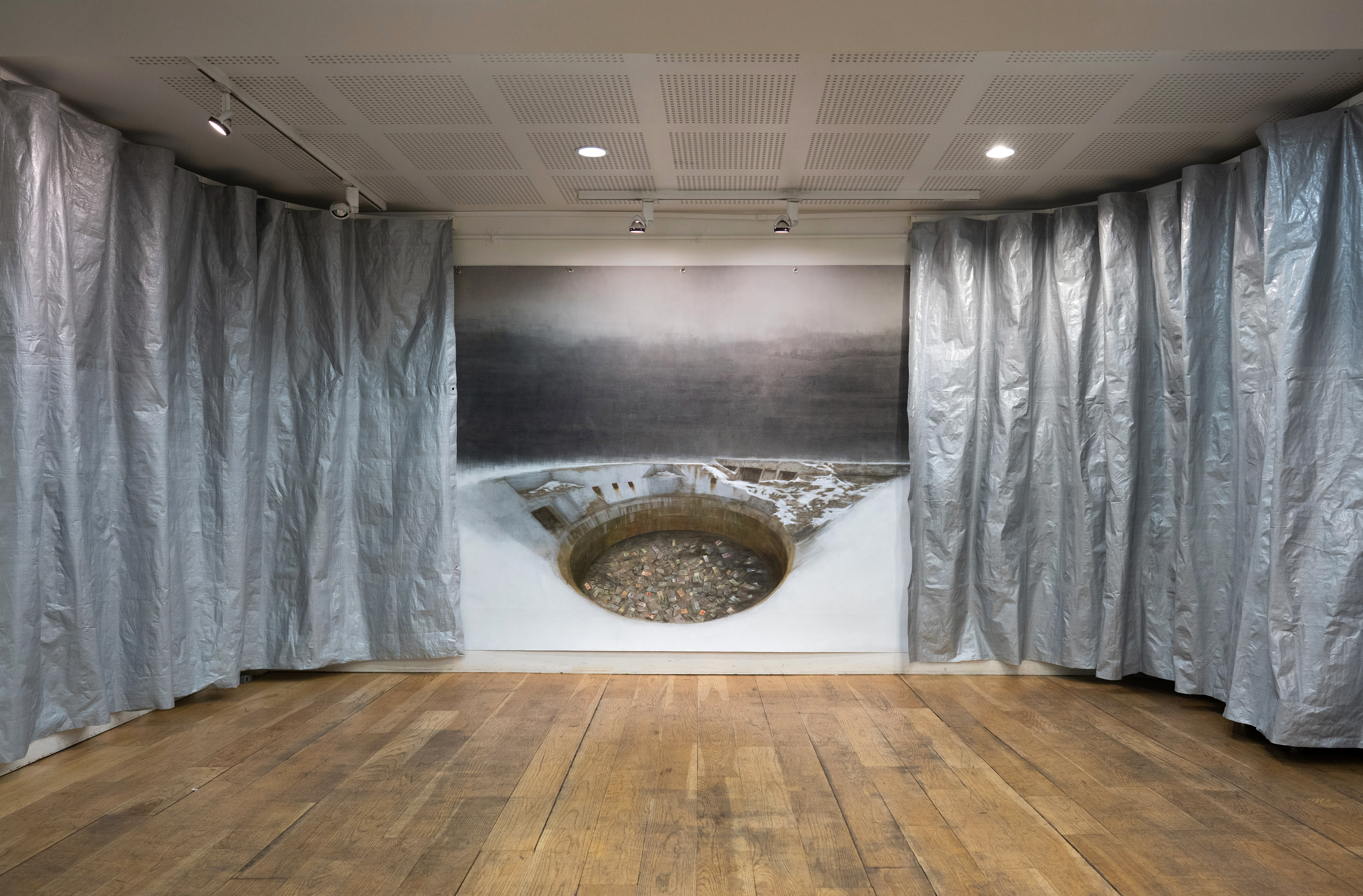
Acting Out at Pushkin House, 2022

In autumn 2022, Otdelnov presented his first UK solo exhibition, Acting Out, at Pushkin House of London. Spread over three floors, the show unfolded as a visual narrative on the afterlife of the Soviet Union and its psychological echoes in contemporary Russia. Using recurring motifs such as the red carpet of Soviet bureaucracy and imagery of bunkers, missile silos, and discarded rouble notes, Otdelnov reflected on the transformation of collective trauma into new forms of aggression and nostalgia. Combining historical and psychological perspectives, Acting Out addressed how unresolved Soviet legacies continue to shape Russia's present identity and its war in Ukraine, turning symbols of power and progress into reminders of loss, denial, and cyclical violence.

Otdelnov views the historical trajectory of his country with an eye for paradoxical recurrences and for the self-serving revisionism of the current political elite. But the absurdism in his work is understated, as it has to be to avoid the shrillness of propaganda, old and new. This is a tightly organised show with a dark and complex narrative that is no less powerful for being expressed in muted terms.

— Marcus Verhagen,

=== Scenes from a Nightmare. 2022–2025 ===
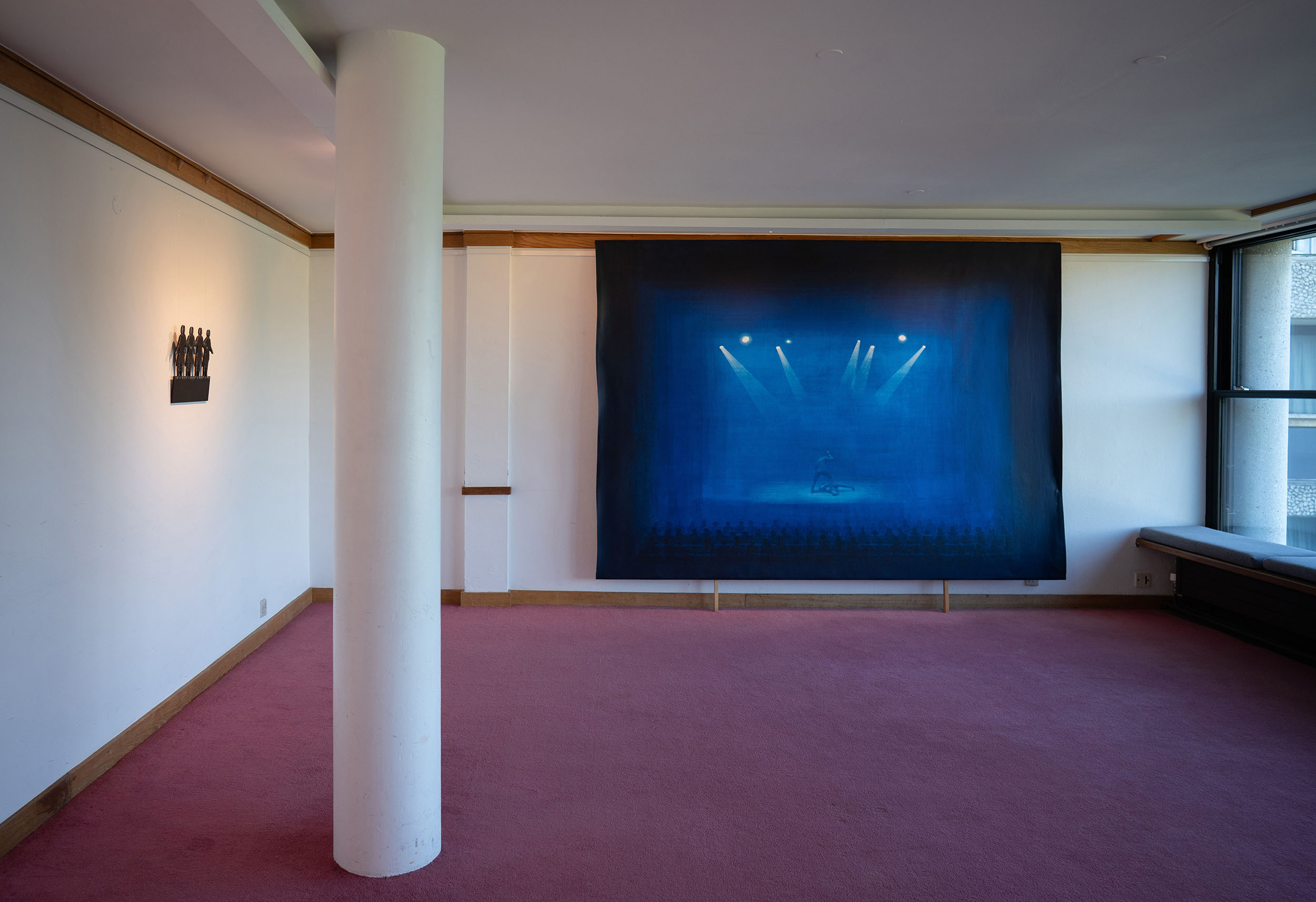
Scenes from a Nightmare at Wolfson College, 2025

In February 2022, Otdelnov publicly spoke out against Russia's invasion of Ukraine. In spring 2022, he created the drawing series Hands of War, based on photographs from war correspondents. In March–April 2022, he produced the watercolor series Field of Experiments, exhibited in summer 2022 at Kalmar Art Museum (Sweden). The works depict a deserted snowy field interrupted by isolated objects such as a checkpoint, a concrete fence, a red carpet, a burned house, and human figures. The title refers to the song Russian Field of Experiments by the band Grazhdanskaya Oborona. The series addresses themes of isolation, generational rupture, and geopolitical conflict. In 2025, Otdelnov unified these works under the new title Scenes from a Nightmare and exhibited them at Wolfson College, Oxford.

== Exhibitions and collections ==
=== Selected personal exhibitions ===
- 2026 — Estates: Fragile Utopia. Lewisham Arthouse, London
- 2025 — Scenes from a Nightmare. Wolfson College, Oxford
- 2025 — A Child in Time. A.P.T. Gallery, London
- 2024 — Hometown. The Old Waiting Room, Peckham Rye railway station, London
- 2022 — Acting Out. Pushkin House, London
- 2022 — The Field of Experiments, Kalmar Art Museum, Sweden
- 2022 — Promzona, Uppsala Art Museum, Uppsala
- 2021 — Russian Nowhere. The Art Gallery of Yeltsin Center, Yekaterinburg
- 2021 — Russian Nowhere, Triumph Gallery, Moscow
- 2019 — Promzona, Moscow Museum of Modern Art, Moscow
- 2018 — Factory Anecdotes, Creative Industrial Cluster Oktava, Tula
- 2018 — Chemical Plant, FUTURO Gallery, Nizhny Novgorod
- 2017 — Ruins, Victoria Art Gallery, Samara
- 2016 — Mall. Time of Colorful Sheds, Centre of Contemporary Culture SMENA, Kazan
- 2016 — White Sea. Black Hole, Arsenal, National Centre for Contemporary Arts, Nizhny Novgorod
- 2016 — Deserts. 2002 – 2017, Belyaevo Gallery, Moscow
- 2015 — Mall, Triumph Gallery, Moscow
- 2014 — Inner Degunino, Moscow Museum of Modern Art, Moscow
- 2012 — Neon Landscape, Agency. Art Ru, Moscow
- 2010 – 2012 — Otra Cotidianidad. Quinta del Berro Cultural Center, Madrid; Casa de los Picos, Segovia; Juana Frances Hall, Madrid; Cervantes Birthplace Museum, Alcala de Henares; Nicholas Salmeron Cultural Centre, Madrid; Cervantes Museum, Esquivias; Centro Ruso de Ciencia y Cultura, Madrid

=== Biennials ===
- 2021 — Ringing Trace. Personal project within the Artist-in-Residence program of the 6th Ural Industrial Biennale of Contemporary Art, former dormitory of the Laboratory B, Sokol village, Chelyabinsk region
- 2019 — Orienteering and Positioning. The Main Project of the 8th Moscow International Biennale of Contemporary Art, Tretyakov Gallery, Moscow
- 2018 — Art Art and Technology. Pros and Cons. The Main Project of the 8th International Tashkent Biennale of Contemporary Art, Central Exhibition Hall of the Academy of Arts of Uzbekistan, Tashkent
- 2017 — New Literacy. The Main Project of the 4th Ural Industrial Biennale of Contemporary Art, Yekaterinburg
- 2015 — No Time. Special project of the 6th Moscow Biennale of Contemporary Art, CCA Winzavod, Moscow
- 2015 — Metageography. Space – Image – Action. Special projects of the 6th Moscow Biennale of Contemporary Art, Tretyakov Gallery, Moscow
- 2014 — A Time for Dreams. The Main Project of the 4th Moscow International Biennale for Young Art, Museum of Moscow
- 2014 — No man's land. Parallel Programme of the 4th Moscow International Biennale for Young Art, Grinberg Gallery, Moscow
- 2007 — Personal Acquaintance. Parallel Programme of the 3rd Moscow Biennale for Contemporary Art, Kovcheg Gallery, Moscow

=== Selected group exhibitions ===
- 2025 — The Last Train. The Old Waiting Room, Peckham Rye Station, London
- 2025 — NO. Kunstraum Kreuzberg, Berlin
- 2024 — Cellule. Storage room, Centre Pompidou, Paris
- 2024 — Breath 2024. CICA Museum, Czong Institute for Contemporary Art, Gimpo, South Korea
- 2024–2025 — Brainwashing Machine, The Crypt Gallery, London; Artten Gallery, Stockholm; La Zona Gallery, Madrid
- 2023 — 73—23, Pal Project Gallery, Paris
- 2022 — Overwhelming Majority?, Shtager gallery, London
- 2022 — Art for Sanity: Reverse Perspective of War, MANYI—Kulturális Műhely, Budapest
- 2022 — Thing. Space. Human. Art of the second half of the XX–early XXI century from the collection of the Tretyakov Gallery. Tretyakov Gallery, Moscow
- 2021 — Living Matter. Tretyakov Gallery, Moscow
- 2021 — Moscow–Seoul: Common Ideas. Museum of Moscow, Moscow
- 2021 — Socialist Realism. Metamorphosis. Soviet Art 1927 – 1987. Tretyakov Gallery, Moscow
- 2020 — Generation XXI. Tretyakov Gallery, Moscow
- 2020 — Viral Self-Portraits. Online exhibition. Museum of Modern Art (Ljubljana), Ljubljana
- 2018 — Where will I be, Selected works from MMOMA Collection. Krasnoyarsk Museum Center, Krasnoyarsk
- 2018 — Metageography: Orientalism and Dreams of Robinsons. Zarya Center for Contemporary Art, Vladivostok
- 2018 — 10/7. Collection Highlights / Display History, Moscow Museum of Modern Art, Moscow
- 2017 — Come Back Home. Institute of Russian Realist Art, Moscow
- 2017 — Noise of Time. Russian Contemporary Art from Erarta Museum, Maritime Centre, Kotka, Finland
- 2015 — Fest, Krasnoyarsk Museum Center. Krasnoyarsk
- 2015 — Piece of Space Traversed by Mind. New Wing of Gogol Museum, Moscow
- 2015 — Sub Observation, Moscow Museum of Modern Art, Moscow
- 2015 — Expanding Space, GES-2, Moscow
- 2015 — Russia. Realism. XXI century. State Russian Museum, St. Petersburg
- 2014 — Fortune Museum. Moscow Museum of Modern Art, Moscow
- 2014 — Perception Transfers. From analog to digital. CCA Sokol, Moscow
- 2013 — Strabag Art Award, Vienna
- 2013 — Stanzas, Erarta Gallery, St. Petersburg
- 2013 — Horizons, CCI Fabrika, Moscow
- 2012 — Combine. Retrospective. Heritage Gallery, Moscow
- 2011 — The forms of life. Return to reality. Tretyakov Gallery, Moscow
- 2011 — Russian Metaphysics. Italian Objectivity. The Beginning of the New Century. Russian Academy of Arts, Moscow
- 2010 — Art Sanatorium. Tretyakov Gallery, Moscow

=== Selected collections ===
- Tretyakov Gallery, Moscow, Russia
- State Russian Museum, St. Petersburg, Russia
- Uppsala Art Museum, Sweden
- Kalmar Art Museum, Sweden
- Moscow Museum of Modern Art, Russia
- Institute of Russian Realist Art, Moscow, Russia
- National Center for Contemporary Art, Russia
- Pushkin State Museum of Fine Arts, Moscow, Russia
- Sergey Kuryokhin Center for Contemporary Art, St. Petersburg, Russia
- Erarta Museum of Contemporary Art, St. Petersburg, Russia
- Bardin Scientific and Technical Museum, Novokuznetsk, Russia

== Awards ==
- 2015 — Kandinsky Prize: long list, "Project of the Year" nomination for Inner Degunino project
- 2017 — Sergey Kuryokhin Contemporary Art Award: short list, Artist of the Year nomination for White Sea. Black Hole project
- 2017 — Sergey Kuryokhin Contemporary Art Award: "Special Award of the French Institute" nomination, for the White Sea. Black Hole project
- 2017 — Kandinsky Prize long list, "Project of the Year" nomination for White Sea. Black Hole project
- 2019 — Kandinsky Prize: long list, "Project of the Year" nomination for Psychozoic era project
- 2020 — Artist of the Year by Cosmoscow Foundation
- 2020 — Innovation Art Prize: the winner, "Artist of the Year" nomination for Promzona project
- 2021 — Kandinsky Prize: short list (Promzona project)

== Publications ==
=== Monographs and exhibition catalogues ===
- V. Diakonov (2012). Pavel Otdelnov. Neon Landscape. Catalog of the exhibition. Moscow: Agency. Art Ru. p. 38
- D. Kamyshnikova (2014). Internal Degunino. Pavel Otdelnov. Moscow: Triumph. p. 24.
- I. Kulik; Otdelnov, Pavel (2015). Pavel Otdelnov. MALL. Moscow: Triumph. p. 44.
- D. Kamyshnikova; K. Zatsepin; P. Otdelnov (2019). Pavel Otdelnov. PROMZONA. Moscow: Triumph. p. 192.
- S. Polyakova; M. Bobyleva; P. Otdelnov (2021). Pavel Otdelnov. RUSSIAN NOWHERE. Catalog of the exhibition. Moscow: Triumph. p. 78.
- A. Erofeev; E. Tolchennikova; A. Korytov; M. Loskov (Eds.). (2020). ЧА ЩА (CHA SHA). Exhibition in the Forest. Jart Gallery. p. 329
- A. Khitrov, I. Krasilschik, A. Stognei, G. Timchenko, I. Venyavkin, A. Zerkaleva (2025). NO. The Book. Berlin, Germany: Kunstraum Kreuzberg/Bethanien. pp. 260.
- D. Ozerkov, D. Vierny & pal project, ed. (2024). 73-23. Exhibition catalog. Paris. p. 232.

=== Books by art critics ===
- K. Zatsepin (2016). Пространство взгляда. Искусство 2000 — 2010–х годов. Сборник статей [The Space of Vision. Art 2000 — 2010s. Digest of articles] (in Russian). Samara: Book Edition. p. 115.
- D. Mille (2020). Trajectories of Modernization in Russia: Artists Recalibrating the Sensorium. In Latour, Bruno; Weibel, Peter (eds.). Critical Zones. Observatories for Earthly Politics. Cambridge, Massachusetts: Zentrum für Kunst und Medien Karlsruhe, MIT Press. pp. 378–379.
- S. Reviakin; E. Lucie-Smith (2022). Russian Art in the New Millennium. Unicorn Publishing Group. p. 256
- I. Kulik (2024). Projected Passages. Contemporary Art in a Hauntological Perspective. PArt. Lectures (in Russian). AST. pp. 66–71/384.

=== Scholarly articles ===
- I. Sokolov (2021). The Russian Tlen. Or aesthetics of the bumblefuck. Young Anthropology – Undergraduate Student Journal of Anthropology. 3. Department of Anthropology, University of Toronto Mississauga: pp. 27–31.
- E. Sarkisian Åkerman (2021). Det kollektiva och det privata minnet: Sokol, Otdelnov och Muromtseva, Konst i ruinerna av en utopi: en analys av nominerade bidrag till Kandinsky- och Innovatsijapriserna 2019/2020 (in Swedish). [The Collective and the Private Memory: Sokol, Otdelnov and Muromtseva part of: Art in the Ruins of a Utopia: An Analysis of Nominated Entries for the Kandinsky and Innovation Prizes]. Uppsala University. pp. 29–35/54.
- L. A. Zaks (2021). Эстетическое наших дней: новая феноменология [The Aesthetic of Our Times: A New Phenomenology]. Koinon Vol. 2(3), pp. 44–66.
- S. V. Polyakova (2021). Русское Нигде как пространство семиозиса: к истории одной выставки [Russian Nowhere as a Space of Semiosis]. Human Being: Image and Essence. INION RAN. Faculty of Philosophy, Moscow State University, Vol. 1(49), pp. 146–164
- P. Otdelnov (2023). Making of an Art Project: Ringing Trace. In N. Mörner (Ed.), Ecological Concerns in Transition. Södertörn University. pp. 59–64.
- R. Wigh Abrahamsson; A. Brutemark; Joosse, S. et al. (2023). IMAGINATIVE POWER: The role of art in environmental communication, Swedish University of Agricultural Sciences. 26 p.
- A. Arutyunyan; A. Egorov (2024). Personal Traces in the Soviet Industrial Aftermath. Pavel Otdelnov's Promzona and Haim Sokol's Paper Memory Exhibitions in Moscow. In F. Guerin & M. Szcześniak (Eds.), Visual culture of post-industrial Europe. Amsterdam University Press. pp. 243–266.
- P. A. Otdelnov (2024). A Critical Juncture. In L. Piters-Hofmann (Ed.), What Is to Be Done?. Logos Verlag. pp. 165–172.

== Gallery ==
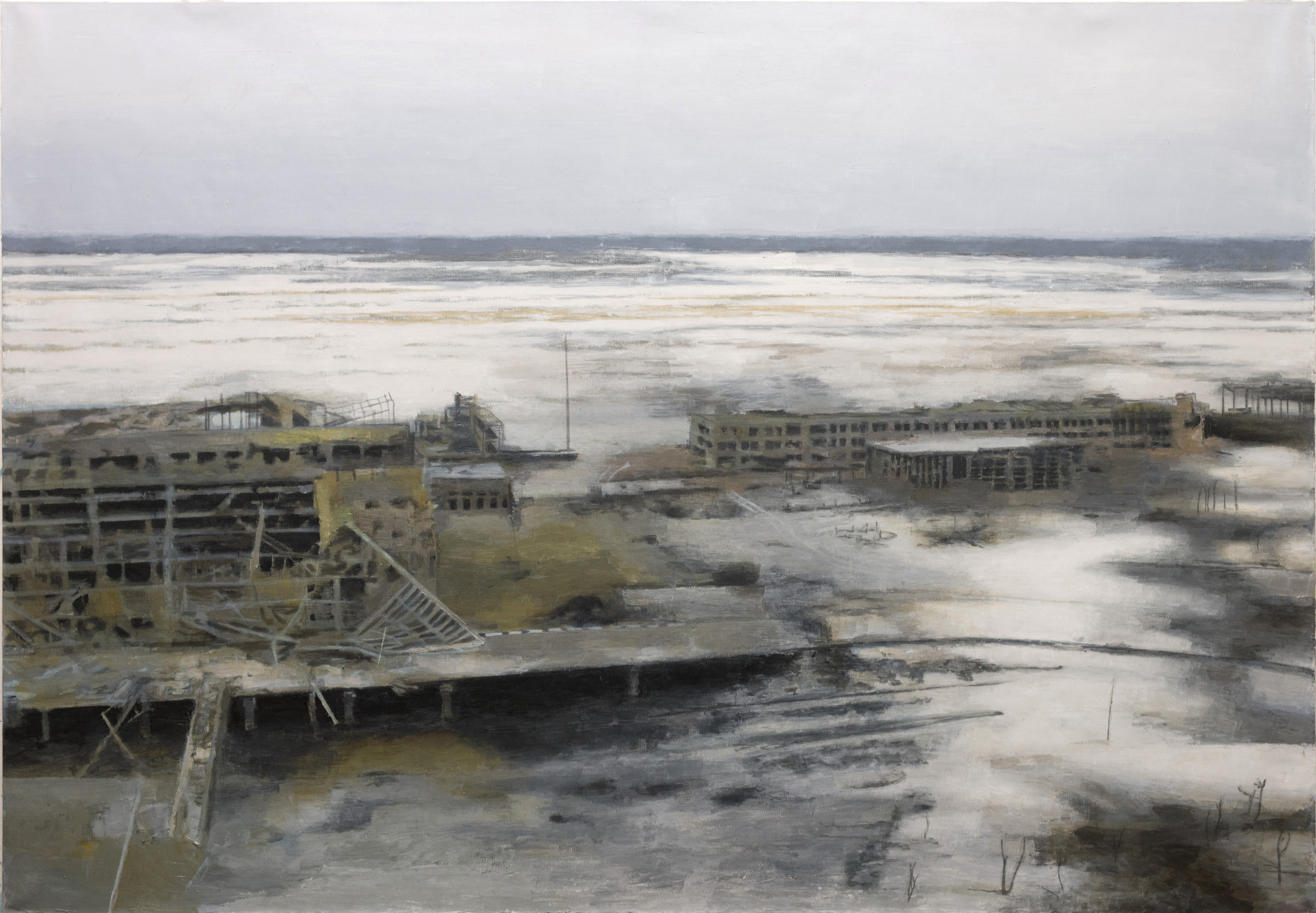
Pavel Otdelnov. No Flights Today. 2015

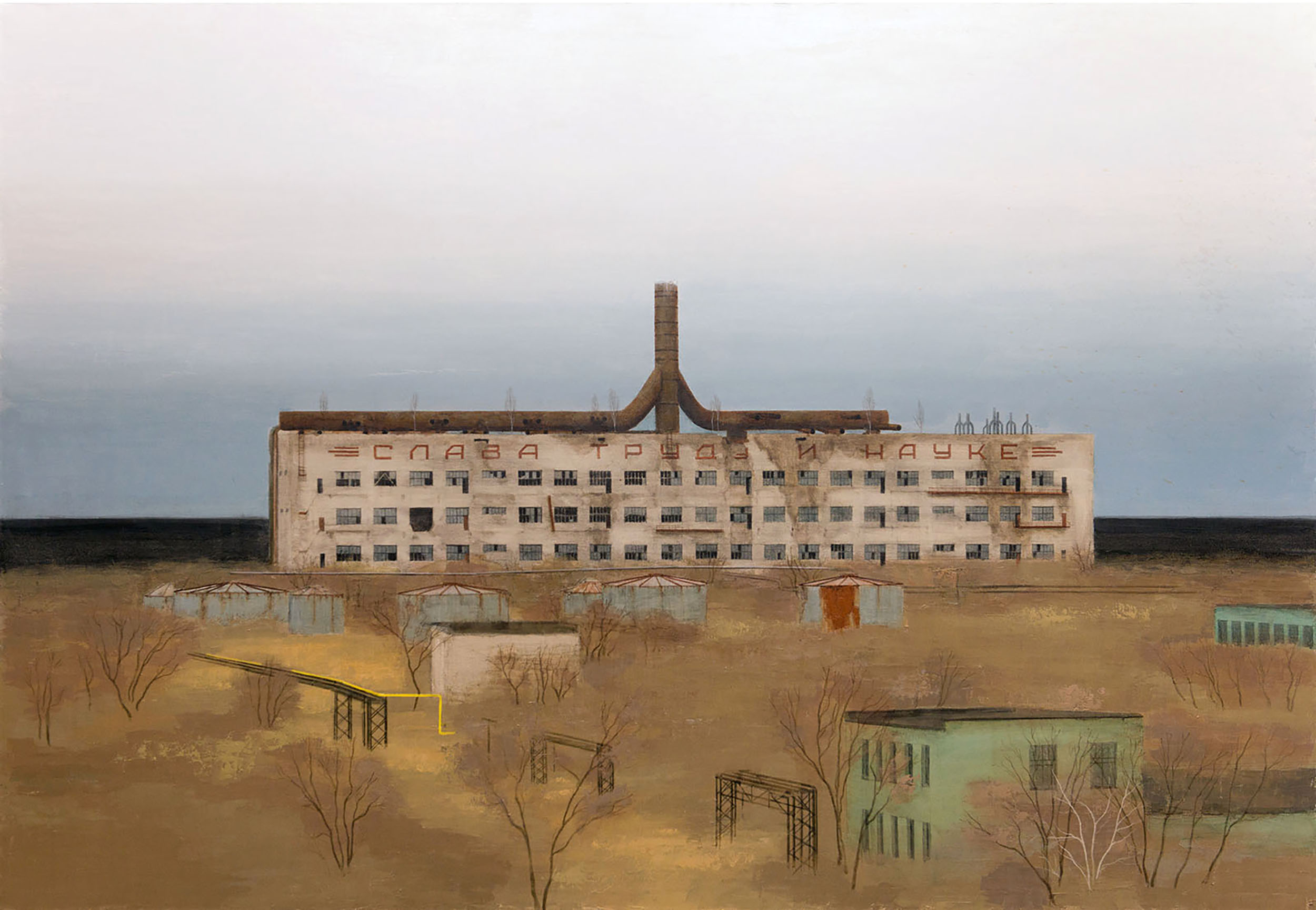
Pavel Otdelnov. Glory to Labour. 2016

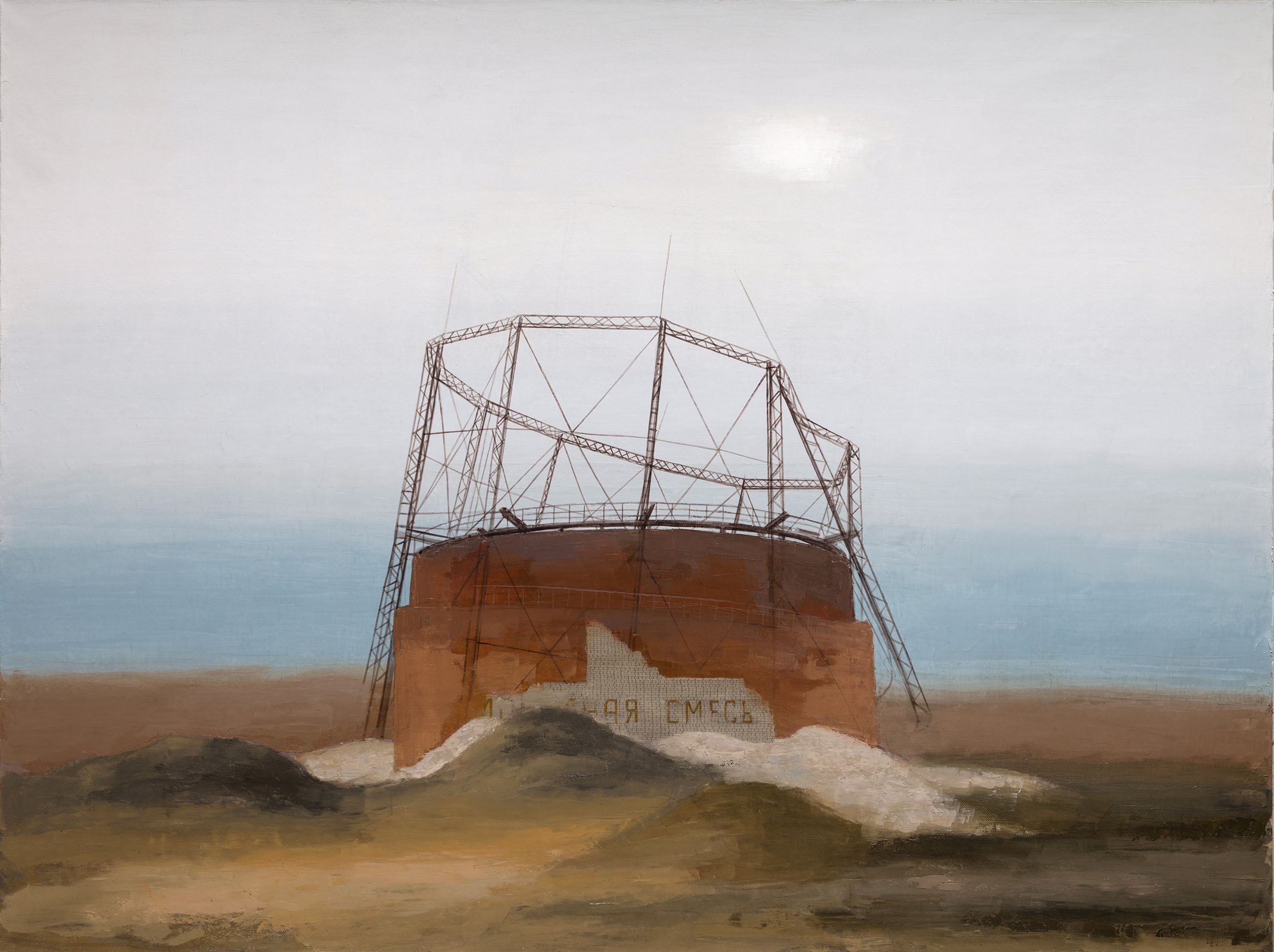
Pavel Otdelnov. Gas Holder. 2017

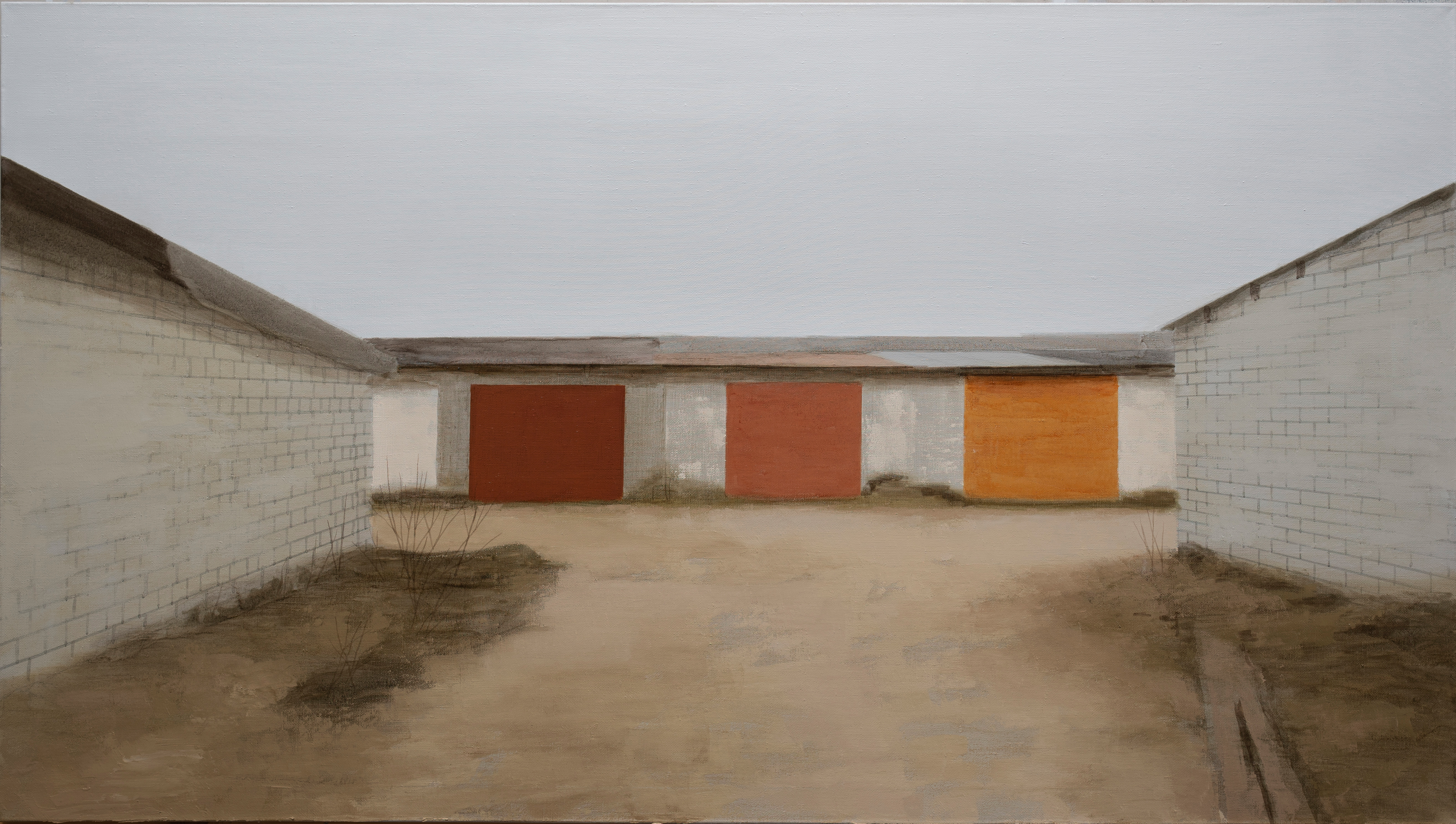
Pavel Otdelnov. Garages. 2020

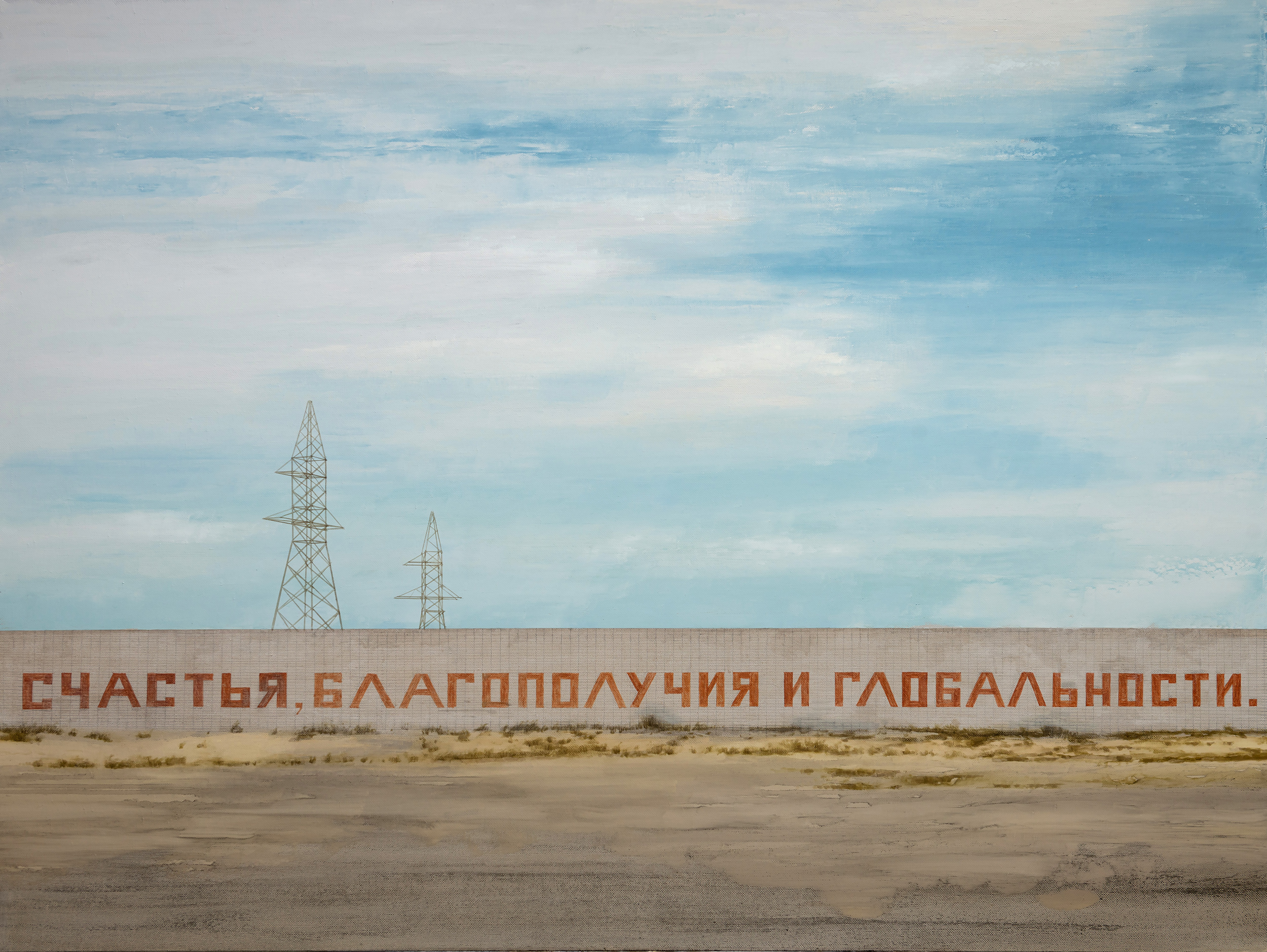
Pavel Otdelnov. Globality. 2020

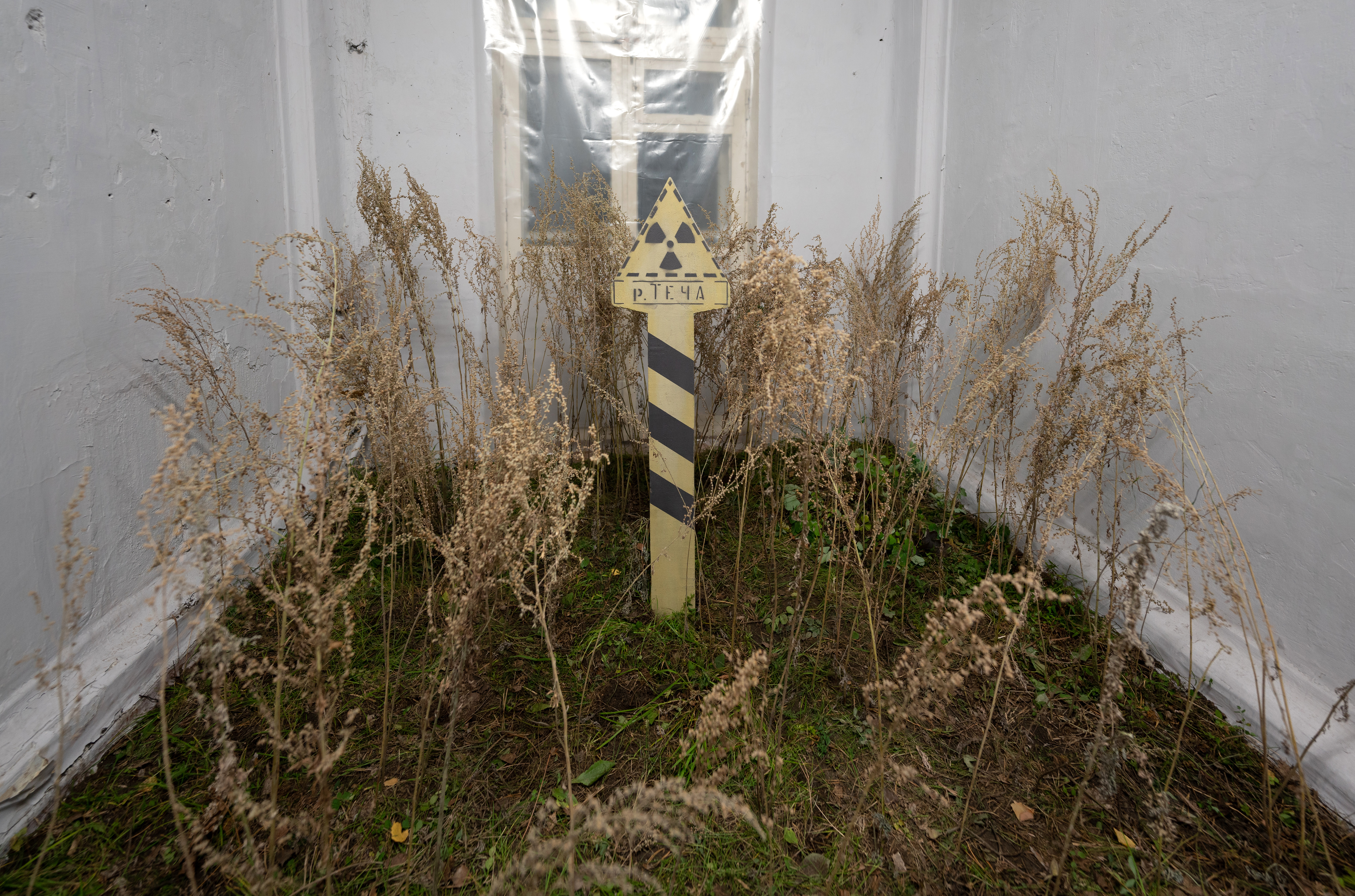
Pavel Otdelnov. Techa. 2021

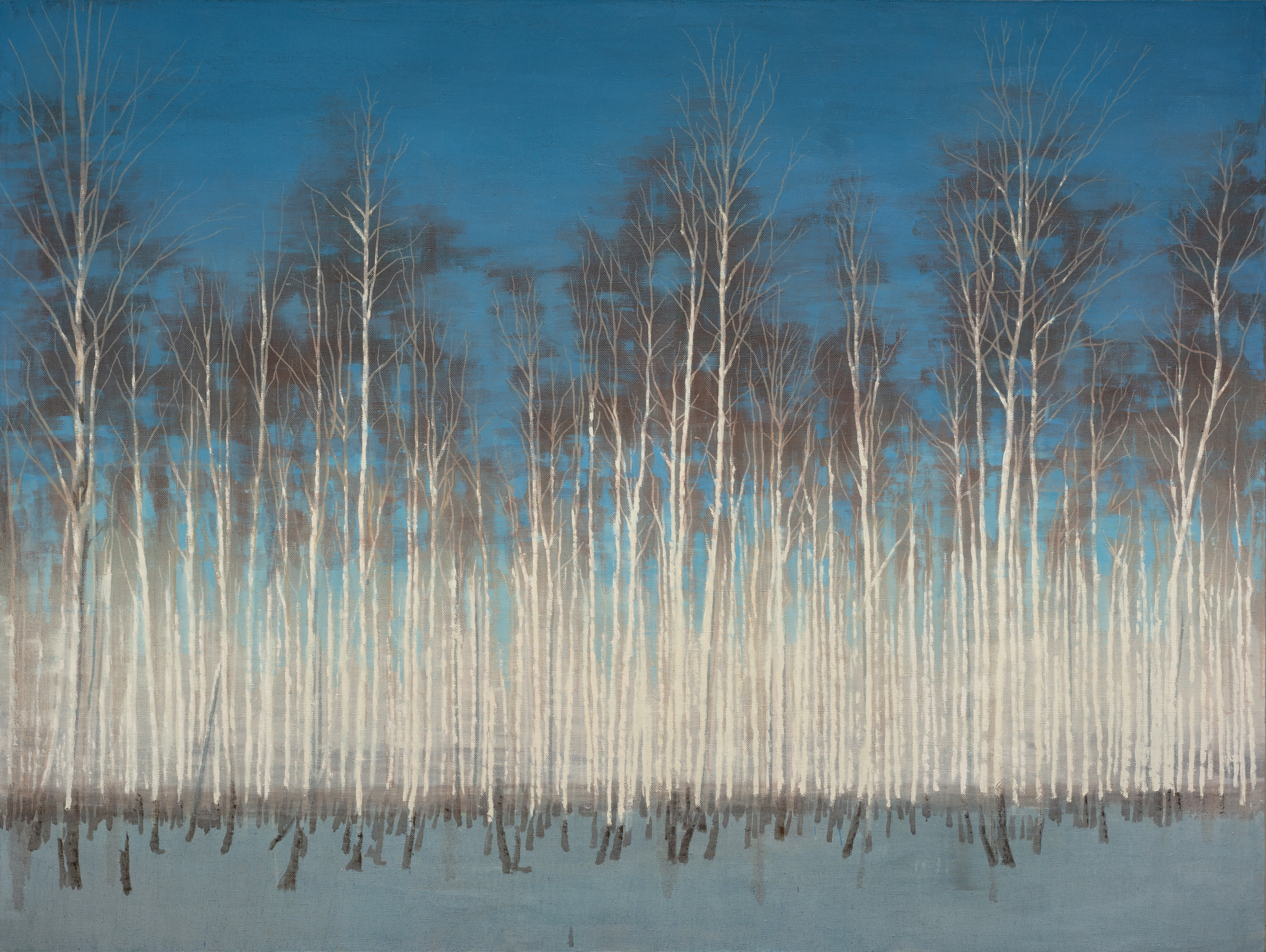
Pavel Otdelnov. Birch grove. 2021

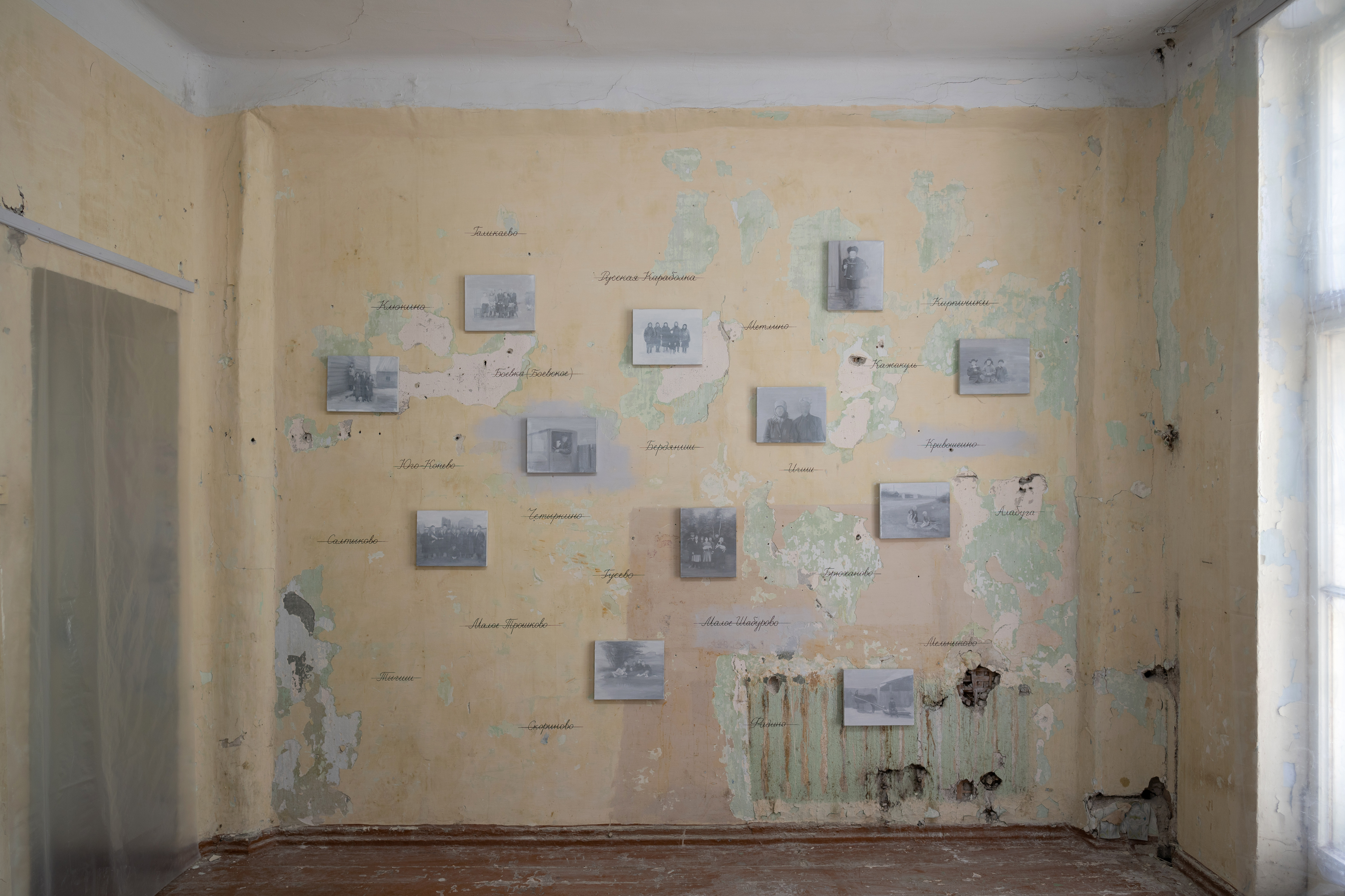
Pavel Otdelnov. Relocated. 2021

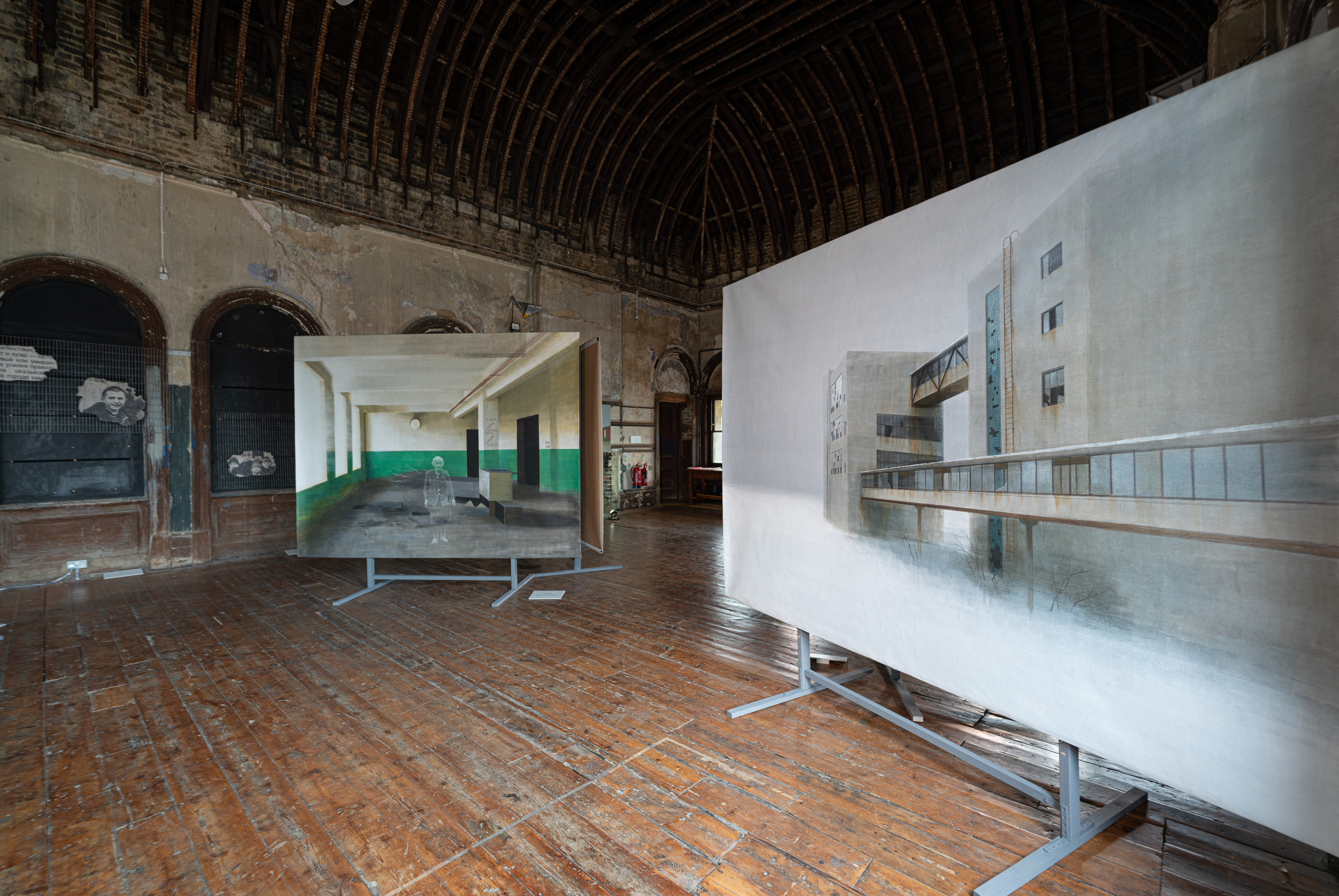
Pavel Otdelnov. Hometown. Exhibition view. 2024

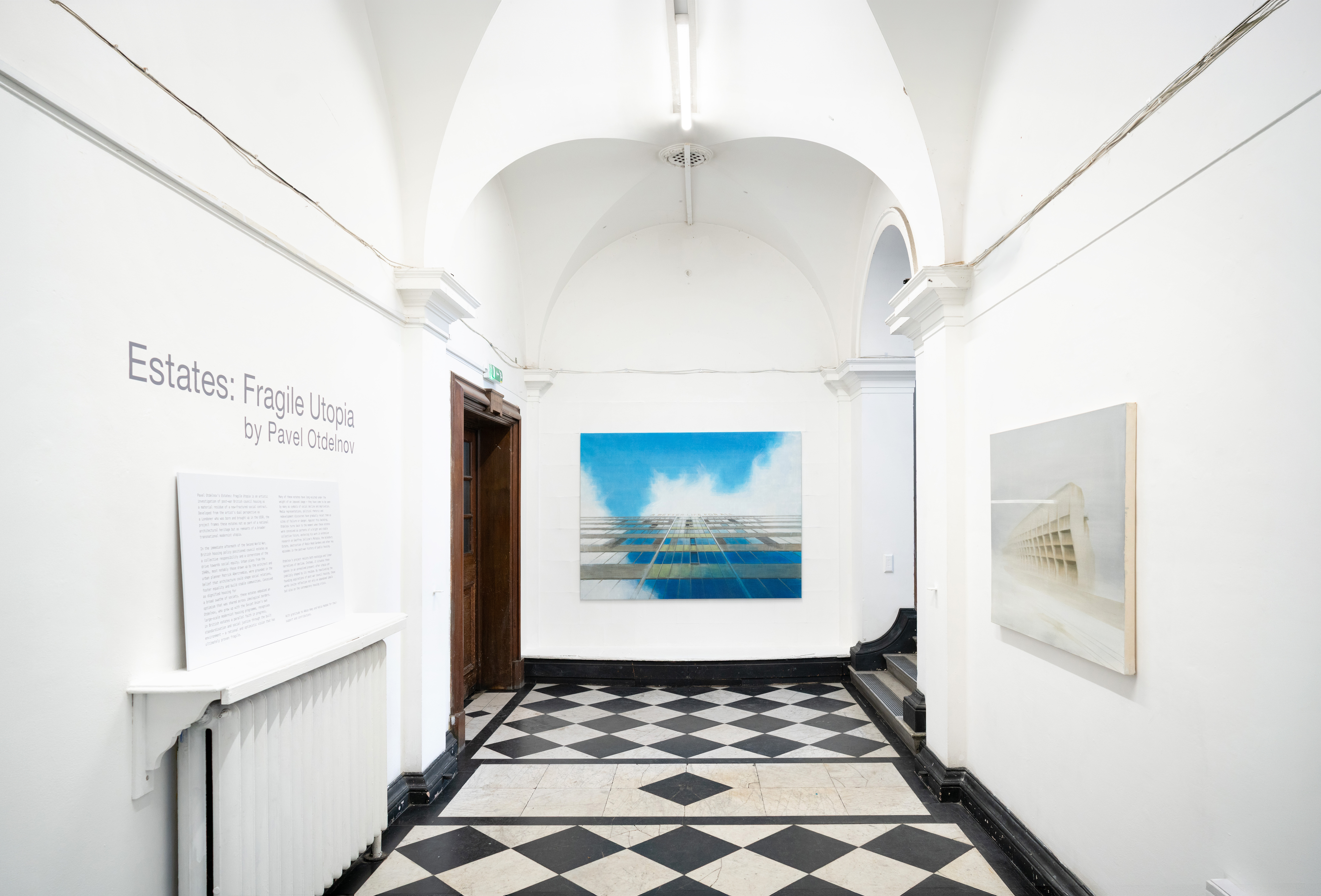
Pavel Otdelnov. Estates: Fragile Utopia. Exhibition view. 2026
