= Institute of Russian Realist Art =

The Institute of Russian Realist Art
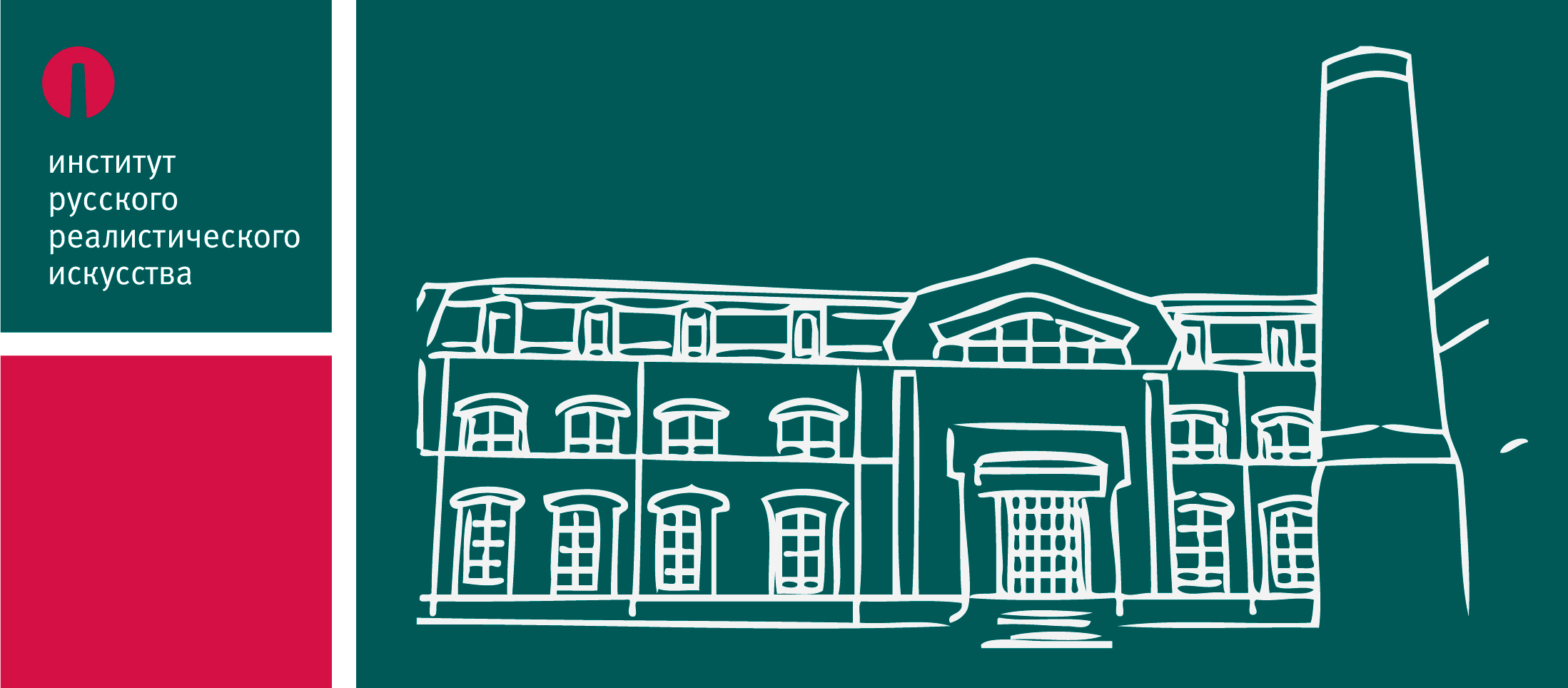

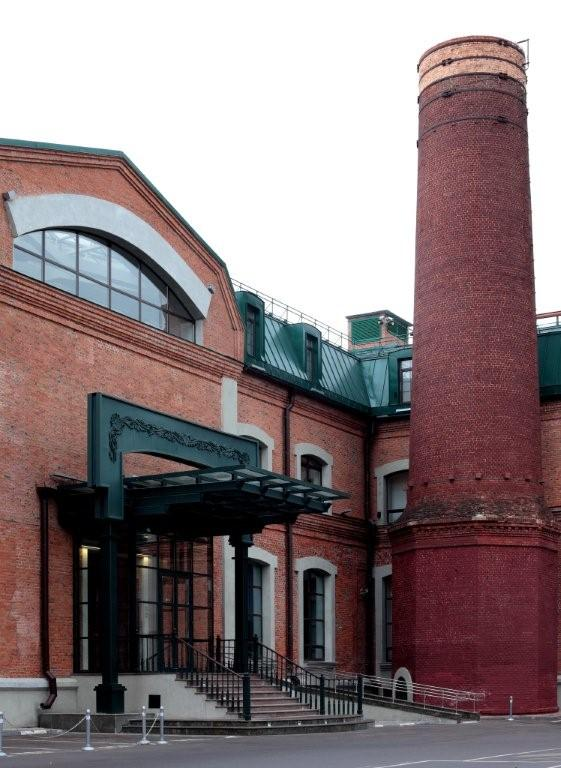
- The main entrance to the gallery, in 2014.
- Interactive fullscreen map
- Former name: IRRA museum
- Established: 2011; 15 years ago
- Location: Moscow, Russia
- Coordinates: 55°43′N 37°39′E
- Type: Art museum
- Collections: Soviet art
- Director: Nadezhda Stepanova
- Owner: Alexey Ananiev

The Institute of Russian Realist Art (IRRA) is a private art institution in Moscow. The institution seeks to revitalise the public and social traditions of Russian artistic patronage. The IRRA museum and exhibition centre was opened on December 1, 2011 in one of the old buildings of the former cotton-printing factory built in the Zamoskvorechye District of Moscow at the end of the 19th century.

== First floor ==
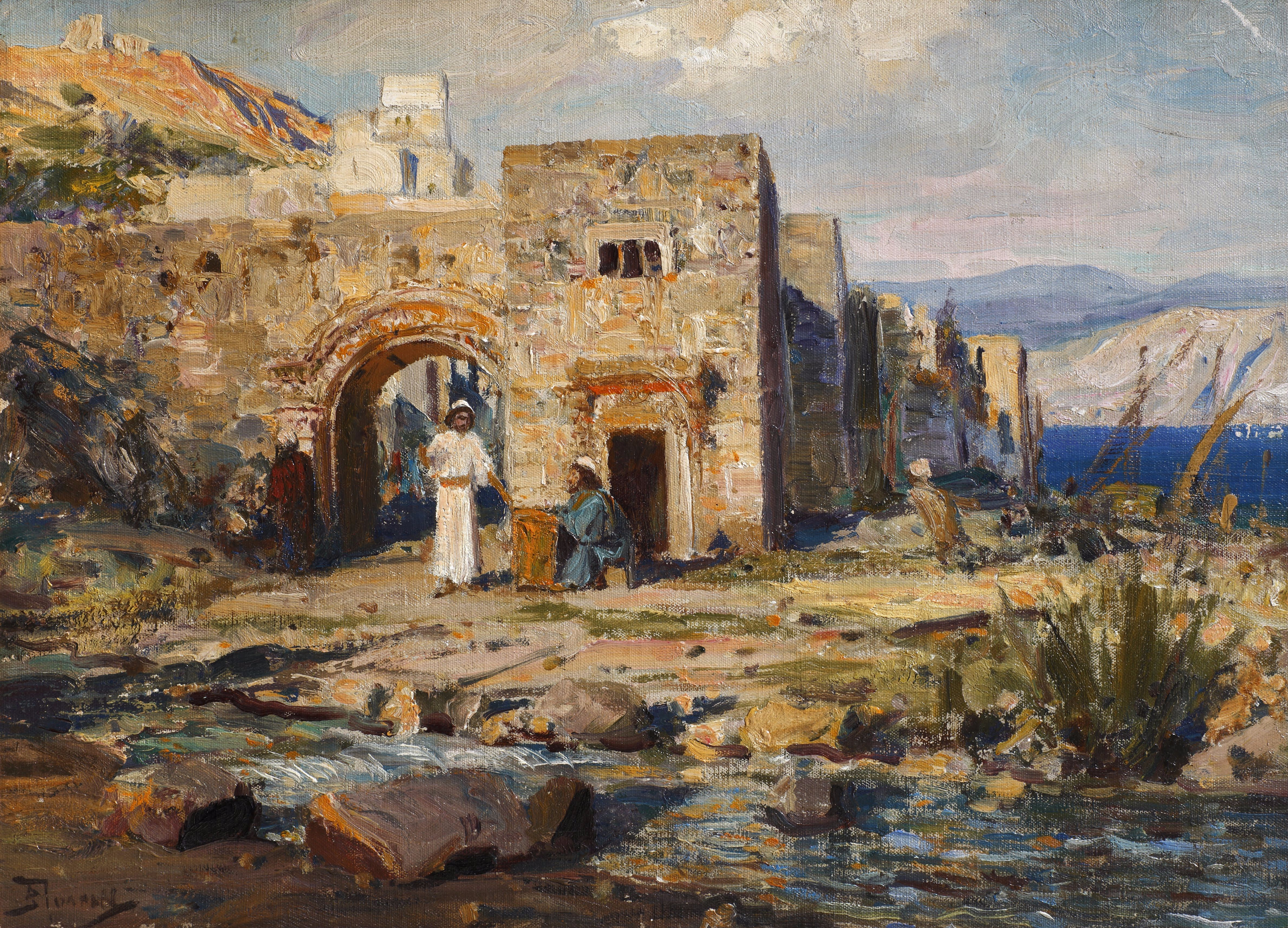
Vasily Polenov, The apostle Matthew, c. 1910

The halls of the first floor familiarise with present-day life in Russia, including works by such members of the Moscow school of painting as Viktor Kalinin, Alexei Sukhovetsky, Vladimir Telin, Nikolai Zaitsev, Vyacheslav Stekolschikov, Nikolai Solomin; the works of Leningrad painters Andrei Mylnikov, Yevsei Moiseenko, Boris Ugarov, Vyacheslav Zagonek; the artists from Vladimir, including Kim Britov, Vladimir Yukin and Mikhail Izotov.

== Second floor ==
The second floor of the Institute of Russian Realist Art displays the Soviet art collection of the second half of the 20th century. At its centre are works by the painters of the 1960s including "National Artists", and full members of the Russian Academy of Arts Gely Korzhev, the brothers Sergei and Alexei Tkachev, Viktor Ivanov, Petr Ossovsky, Dmitry Zhilinsky and Tair Salakhov.

== Third floor ==
The halls of the third floor display important sections of the museum collection, Soviet art from the first half of the 20th century, including works by figures such as Arkady Plastov, Sergey Gerasimov, Alexander Deineka, Yury Pimenov, Georgy Nissky, Isaak Brodsky and other painters.
