= List of American films of 2021 =

This is a list of American films released in 2021.

The 2021 release schedule includes numerous notable films that were originally scheduled for release in 2020 but were postponed due to the COVID-19 pandemic.

== Box office ==
The highest-grossing American films released in 2021, by domestic box office gross revenue, are as follows:

Highest-grossing films of 2021
Rank	Title	Distributor	Domestic gross
1	Spider-Man: No Way Home	Sony	$804,617,772
2	Shang-Chi and the Legend of the Ten Rings	Disney	$224,886,280
3	Venom: Let There Be Carnage	Sony	$213,550,366
4	Black Widow	Disney	$183,651,655
5	F9	Universal	$173,005,945
6	Eternals	Disney	$164,870,234
7	Sing 2	Universal	$162,790,990
8	No Time to Die	MGM / Universal	$160,891,007
9	A Quiet Place Part II	Paramount	$160,072,261
10	Ghostbusters: Afterlife	Sony	$129,360,575

== January–March ==
Opening		Title	Company credits	Cast and crew	Ref.
J A N U A R Y	1	Shadow in the Cloud	Vertical Entertainment	Roseanne Liang (director/screenplay); Max Landis (screenplay); Chloë Grace Moretz, Taylor John Smith, Beulah Koale, Callan Mulvey, Nick Robinson	
J A N U A R Y	5	Hacksaw	Leone Films / Midnight Releasing	Anthony Leone (director/screenplay); Amy Cay, Brian Patrick Butler, Michael C. Burgess, Cortney Palm, George Jac, Sadie Katz, Jayce Venditti	
J A N U A R Y	12	Dr. Bird's Advice for Sad Poets	Relativity Media / Ketchup Entertainment	Yaniv Raz (director/screenplay); Lucas Jade Zumann, Taylor Russell, Chase Stokes, Lisa Edelstein, David Arquette, Jason Isaacs	
J A N U A R Y	13	The White Tiger	Netflix / ARRAY / Purple Pebble Pictures	Ramin Bahrani (director/screenplay); Adarsh Gourav, Rajkummar Rao, Priyanka Chopra Jonas	
J A N U A R Y	14	Locked Down	HBO Max / Warner Bros. Pictures	Doug Liman (director); Steven Knight (screenplay); Anne Hathaway, Chiwetel Ejiofor, Stephen Merchant, Mindy Kaling, Lucy Boynton, Dulé Hill, Jazmyn Simon, Mark Gatiss, Claes Bang, Ben Stiller, Ben Kingsley	
J A N U A R Y	15	The Dig	Netflix / Clerkenwell Films	Simon Stone (director); Moira Buffini (screenplay); Carey Mulligan, Ralph Fiennes, Lily James, Johnny Flynn, Ben Chaplin, Ken Stott, Archie Barnes, Monica Dolan	
J A N U A R Y	15	Outside the Wire	Netflix	Mikael Håfström (director); Rob Yescombe, Rowan Athale (screenplay); Anthony Mackie, Damson Idris, Emily Beecham, Michael Kelly, Pilou Asbæk	
J A N U A R Y	15	The Marksman	Open Road Films	Robert Lorenz (director/screenplay); Chris Charles, Danny Kravitz (screenplay); Liam Neeson, Katheryn Winnick, Juan Pablo Raba, Teresa Ruiz	
J A N U A R Y	15	The Ultimate Playlist of Noise	Hulu	Bennett Lasseter (director); Mitchell Winkie (screenplay); Keean Johnson, Madeline Brewer, Rya Kihlstedt, Ian Gomez, Bonnie Hunt	
J A N U A R Y	15	American Skin	Vertical Entertainment	Nate Parker (director/screenplay); Nate Parker, Omari Hardwick, Theo Rossi, Shane Paul McGhie, Milauna Jackson, Beau Knapp	
J A N U A R Y	15	Don't Tell a Soul	Lionsgate / Saban Films	Alex McAulay (director/screenplay); Jack Dylan Grazer, Fionn Whitehead, Rainn Wilson, Mena Suvari	
J A N U A R Y	22	Our Friend	Gravitas Ventures / Black Bear Pictures	Gabriela Cowperthwaite (director); Brad Ingelsby (screenplay); Jason Segel, Dakota Johnson, Casey Affleck, Gwendoline Christie, Cherry Jones	
J A N U A R Y	22	No Man's Land	IFC Films	Conor Allyn (director); Jake Allyn, David Barraza (screenplay); Jake Allyn, Frank Grillo, Jorge A. Jiménez, Andie MacDowell, George Lopez	
J A N U A R Y	22	Born a Champion	Lionsgate	Alex Ranarivelo (director/screenplay); Sean Patrick Flanery (screenplay); Sean Patrick Flanery, Dennis Quaid, Katrina Bowden	
J A N U A R Y	26	Wrong Turn	Saban Films / Constantin Film	Mike P. Nelson (director); Alan B. McElroy (screenplay); Charlotte Vega, Adain Bradley, Bill Sage, Emma Dumont, Dylan McTee, Daisy Head, Matthew Modine	
J A N U A R Y	27	Penguin Bloom	Netflix / Roadshow Films	Glenda Ivin (director); Shaun Grant, Harry Cripps (screenplay); Naomi Watts, Andrew Lincoln, Jacki Weaver, Rachel House	
J A N U A R Y	29	The Little Things	Warner Bros. Pictures / Gran Via Productions / HBO Max	John Lee Hancock (director/screenplay); Denzel Washington, Rami Malek, Jared Leto, Chris Bauer, Michael Hyatt, Terry Kinney, Natalie Morales	
J A N U A R Y	29	Finding ʻOhana	Netflix	Jude Weng (director); Christina Strain (screenplay); Kea Peahu, Alex Aiono, Lindsay Watson, Owen Vaccaro, Kelly Hu, Branscombe Richmond, Chris Parnell, Marc Evan Jackson	
J A N U A R Y	29	Nomadland	Searchlight Pictures / Hulu	Chloé Zhao (director/screenplay); Frances McDormand, David Strathairn, Linda May, Charlene Swankie, Bob Wells	
J A N U A R Y	29	Malcolm & Marie	Netflix	Sam Levinson (director/screenplay); Zendaya, John David Washington	
J A N U A R Y	29	Palmer	Apple TV+	Fisher Stevens (director) Cheryl Guerriero (screenplay); Justin Timberlake, Juno Temple, Alisha Wainwright, June Squibb, Ryder Allen	
F E B R U A R Y	5	Falling	Quiver Distribution	Viggo Mortensen (director/screenplay); Viggo Mortensen, Lance Henriksen, Terry Chen, Sverrir Gudnason, Hannah Gross, Laura Linney	
F E B R U A R Y	5	Bliss	Amazon Studios	Mike Cahill (director/screenplay); Owen Wilson, Salma Hayek	
F E B R U A R Y	5	Little Fish	IFC Films / Black Bear Pictures	Chad Hartigan (director); Mattson Tomlin (screenplay); Olivia Cooke, Jack O'Connell, Raúl Castillo, Soko	
F E B R U A R Y	5	Son of the South	Vertical Entertainment	Barry Alexander Brown (director/screenplay); Lucas Till, Lucy Hale, Cedric the Entertainer, Brian Dennehy	
F E B R U A R Y	5	PVT Chat	Dark Star Pictures	Ben Hozie (director/screenplay); Julia Fox, Nikki Belfiglio, Austin Brown, Peter Vack	
F E B R U A R Y	9	Music	Vertical Entertainment	Sia (director/screenplay); Dallas Clayton (screenplay); Kate Hudson, Leslie Odom Jr., Maddie Ziegler	
F E B R U A R Y	12	Judas and the Black Messiah	Warner Bros. Pictures / Participant / Bron Creative / HBO Max	Shaka King (director/screenplay); Will Berson (screenplay); Daniel Kaluuya, Lakeith Stanfield, Jesse Plemons, Dominique Fishback, Ashton Sanders, Darrell Britt-Gibson, Lil Rel Howery, Algee Smith, Dominique Thorne, Martin Sheen	
F E B R U A R Y	12	The Mauritanian	STXfilms / Topic Studios / BBC Film	Kevin Macdonald (director); M.B. Traven, Rory Haines, Sohrab Noshirvani (screenplay); Jodie Foster, Tahar Rahim, Shailene Woodley, Zachary Levi, Benedict Cumberbatch	
F E B R U A R Y	12	Breaking News in Yuba County	American International Pictures / AGC Studios / Nine Stories Productions	Tate Taylor (director); Amanda Idoko (screenplay); Allison Janney, Mila Kunis, Awkwafina, Regina Hall, Wanda Sykes, Juliette Lewis, Samira Wiley, Matthew Modine, Ellen Barkin	
F E B R U A R Y	12	Barb and Star Go to Vista Del Mar	Lionsgate / Gloria Sanchez Productions	Josh Greenbaum (director); Annie Mumolo, Kristen Wiig (screenplay); Kristen Wiig, Annie Mumolo, Jamie Dornan, Damon Wayans Jr.	
F E B R U A R Y	12	Minari	A24 / Plan B Entertainment	Lee Isaac Chung (director/screenplay); Steven Yeun, Han Ye-ri, Alan Kim, Noel Kate Cho, Scott Haze, Youn Yuh-jung, Will Patton	
F E B R U A R Y	12	To All the Boys: Always and Forever	Netflix	Michael Fimognari (director); Katie Lovejoy (screenplay); Lana Condor, Noah Centineo, Jordan Fisher, Holland Taylor, Sarayu Blue, John Corbett	
F E B R U A R Y	12	The World to Come	Bleecker Street / Ingenious Media	Mona Fastvold (director); Ron Hansen, Jim Shepard (screenplay); Katherine Waterston, Vanessa Kirby, Christopher Abbott, Casey Affleck	
F E B R U A R Y	12	French Exit	Sony Pictures Classics	Azazel Jacobs (director); Patrick deWitt (screenplay); Michelle Pfeiffer, Lucas Hedges, Tracy Letts, Danielle Macdonald, Imogen Poots	
F E B R U A R Y	12	Land	Focus Features / Big Beach	Robin Wright (director); Jesse Chatham, Erin Dignam (screenplay); Robin Wright, Demián Bichir, Kim Dickens	
F E B R U A R Y	12	Willy's Wonderland	Screen Media Films	Kevin Lewis (director); G.O. Parsons (screenplay); Nicolas Cage, Emily Tosta, Ric Reitz, Beth Grant	
F E B R U A R Y	12	The Map of Tiny Perfect Things	Amazon Studios	Ian Samuels (director); Lev Grossman (screenplay); Kathryn Newton, Kyle Allen, Al Madrigal	
F E B R U A R Y	12	Fear of Rain	Lionsgate	Castille Landon (director/screenplay); Katherine Heigl, Madison Iseman, Israel Broussard, Harry Connick Jr.	
F E B R U A R Y	19	I Care a Lot	Netflix / Amazon Studios / STXfilms / Black Bear Pictures	J Blakeson (director/screenplay); Rosamund Pike, Peter Dinklage, Eiza González, Chris Messina, Dianne Wiest, Isiah Whitlock Jr.	
F E B R U A R Y	19	Flora & Ulysses	Disney+ / Walt Disney Pictures	Lena Khan (director); Brad Copeland (screenplay); Matilda Lawler, Alyson Hannigan, Ben Schwartz, Anna Deavere Smith, Danny Pudi, Benjamin Evan Ainsworth, Janeane Garofalo, Kate Micucci	
F E B R U A R Y	19	Silk Road	Lionsgate	Tiller Russell (director/screenplay); Jason Clarke, Nick Robinson, Katie Aselton, Jimmi Simpson, Daniel David Stewart, Darrell Britt-Gibson, Lexi Rabe, Will Ropp, Paul Walter Hauser, Alexandra Shipp	
F E B R U A R Y	26	Tom & Jerry	Warner Bros. Pictures / Warner Animation Group / HBO Max	Tim Story (director); Kevin Costello (screenplay); Chloë Grace Moretz, Michael Peña, Colin Jost, Rob Delaney, Pallavi Sharda, Jordan Bolger, Patsy Ferran, Nicky Jam, Bobby Cannavale, Lil Rel Howery, Ken Jeong	
F E B R U A R Y	26	The United States vs. Billie Holiday	Hulu / Roth/Kirschenbaum Films	Lee Daniels (director); Suzan-Lori Parks (screenplay); Andra Day, Trevante Rhodes, Garrett Hedlund, Leslie Jordan, Miss Lawrence, Adriane Lenox, Natasha Lyonne, Rob Morgan, Da'Vine Joy Randolph, Evan Ross, Tyler James Williams, Tone Bell, Blake DeLong, Randy Davison, Dana Gourrier, Melvin Gregg, Erik LaRay Harvey, Ray Shell	
F E B R U A R Y	26	Cherry	Apple TV+ / AGBO	Anthony and Joe Russo (directors); Angela Russo-Otstot, Jessica Goldberg (screenplay); Tom Holland, Ciara Bravo, Jack Reynor, Michael Rispoli, Jeff Wahlberg	
F E B R U A R Y	26	Crisis	Quiver Distribution	Nicholas Jarecki (director/screenplay); Gary Oldman, Armie Hammer, Evangeline Lilly, Greg Kinnear, Michelle Rodriguez, Luke Evans, Lily-Rose Depp, Scott Mescudi, Martin Donovan	
F E B R U A R Y	26	Billie Eilish: The World's a Little Blurry	Neon / Apple TV+	R. J. Cutler (director/screenplay); Billie Eilish, Finneas O'Connell, Maggie Baird, Patrick O'Connell	
F E B R U A R Y	26	The Vigil	IFC Midnight / Blumhouse Productions	Keith Thomas (director/screenplay); Dave Davis, Menashe Lustig, Malky Goldman, Fred Melamed, Lynn Cohen	
M A R C H	3	Moxie	Netflix	Amy Poehler (director); Tamara Chestna, Dylan Meyer (screenplay); Hadley Robinson, Lauren Tsai, Patrick Schwarzenegger, Hico Hiraga, Sydney Park, Josephine Langford, Clark Gregg, Ike Barinholtz, Amy Poehler, Marcia Gay Harden	
M A R C H	4	Coming 2 America	Amazon Studios / Paramount Pictures	Craig Brewer (director); Kenya Barris, Barry W. Blaustein, David Sheffield (screenplay); Eddie Murphy, Arsenio Hall, Jermaine Fowler, Leslie Jones, Tracy Morgan, KiKi Layne, Shari Headley, Teyana Taylor, Wesley Snipes, James Earl Jones	
M A R C H	4	The SpongeBob Movie: Sponge on the Run	Paramount+ / Paramount Animation / Nickelodeon Movies / MRC	Tim Hill (director/screenplay); Tom Kenny, Awkwafina, Matt Berry, Snoop Dogg, Bill Fagerbakke, Clancy Brown, Tiffany Haddish, Carolyn Lawrence, Mr. Lawrence, Keanu Reeves, Danny Trejo, Reggie Watts	
M A R C H	5	Raya and the Last Dragon	Walt Disney Pictures / Walt Disney Animation Studios / Disney+	Don Hall, Carlos López Estrada (directors); Qui Nguyen, Adele Lim (screenplay); Kelly Marie Tran, Awkwafina, Izaac Wang, Gemma Chan, Daniel Dae Kim, Benedict Wong, Sandra Oh, Thalia Tran, Lucille Soong, Alan Tudyk	
M A R C H	5	Chaos Walking	Lionsgate / Bron Creative / 3 Arts Entertainment	Doug Liman (director); Patrick Ness, Christopher Ford (screenplay); Daisy Ridley, Tom Holland, Mads Mikkelsen, Demián Bichir, Cynthia Erivo, Nick Jonas, Ray McKinnon, Kurt Sutter, David Oyelowo	
M A R C H	5	Boss Level	Hulu / Ingenious Media	Joe Carnahan (director/screenplay); Chris Borey, Eddie Borey (screenplay); Frank Grillo, Mel Gibson, Naomi Watts, Annabelle Wallis, Ken Jeong, Will Sasso, Selina Lo, Meadow Williams, Michelle Yeoh	
M A R C H	5	Boogie	Focus Features	Eddie Huang (director/screenplay); Taylor Takahashi, Taylour Paige, Jorge Lendeborg Jr., Bashar "Pop Smoke" Jackson	
M A R C H	12	Yes Day	Netflix	Miguel Arteta (director); Justin Malen (screenplay); Jennifer Garner, Édgar Ramírez, Jenna Ortega	
M A R C H	12	Long Weekend	Stage 6 Films	Steve Basilone (director/screenplay); Finn Wittrock, Zoë Chao, Casey Wilson, Jim Rash, Damon Wayans Jr.	
M A R C H	12	Cosmic Sin	Saban Films	Edward Drake (director/screenplay); Corey Large (screenplay); Bruce Willis, Frank Grillo, Brandon Thomas Lee, C.J. Perry	
M A R C H	12	Trust	Vertical Entertainment	Brian DeCubellis (director/screenplay); Kristen Lazarian, K.S. Bruce (screenplay); Victoria Justice, Matthew Daddario, Katherine McNamara, Lucien Laviscount, Ronny Chieng, Lindsey Broad	
M A R C H	18	Zack Snyder's Justice League	HBO Max / Warner Bros. Pictures / DC Films / Atlas Entertainment / The Stone Quarry	Zack Snyder (director); Chris Terrio (screenplay); Ben Affleck, Henry Cavill, Amy Adams, Gal Gadot, Ray Fisher, Jason Momoa, Ezra Miller, Willem Dafoe, Jesse Eisenberg, Jeremy Irons, Diane Lane, Connie Nielsen, J. K. Simmons, Ciarán Hinds	
M A R C H	19	The Courier	Lionsgate / Roadside Attractions / FilmNation Entertainment	Dominic Cooke (director); Tom O'Connor (screenplay); Benedict Cumberbatch, Merab Ninidze, Rachel Brosnahan, Jessie Buckley, Angus Wright	
M A R C H	19	City of Lies	Saban Films / Miramax	Brad Furman (director); Christian Contreras (screenplay); Johnny Depp, Forest Whitaker	
M A R C H	19	Happily	Saban Films	BenDavid Grabinski (director/screenplay); Joel McHale, Kerry Bishé, Stephen Root	
M A R C H	26	Nobody	Universal Pictures / Perfect World Pictures / 87North Productions	Ilya Naishuller (director); Derek Kolstad (screenplay); Bob Odenkirk, Connie Nielsen, Aleksei Serebryakov, RZA, Michael Ironside, Colin Salmon, Christopher Lloyd	
M A R C H	26	Bad Trip	Netflix / Orion Pictures	Kitao Sakurai (director/screenplay); Dan Curry, Eric André (screenplay); Eric André, Lil Rel Howery, Tiffany Haddish	
M A R C H	26	The Seventh Day	Vertical Entertainment / Voltage Pictures	Justin P. Lange (director/screenplay); Guy Pearce, Vadhir Derbez, Stephen Lang, Keith David, Robin Bartlett	
M A R C H	26	Senior Moment	Screen Media Films	Giorgio Serafini (director); Kurt Brungardt, Christopher Momenee (screenplay); William Shatner, Jean Smart, Christopher Lloyd	
M A R C H	26	North Hollywood	Illegal Civilization	Mikey Alfred (director); Rusty Johnson (screenplay); Ryder McLaughlin, Vince Vaughn, Miranda Cosgrove	
M A R C H	26	Shoplifters of the World	Piccadilly Pictures / Sun Capital / 3:59 / Untitled Entertainment / Oscura Film	Stephen Kijak (director/screenplay); Helena Howard, Ellar Coltrane, Elena Kampouris, Nick Krause, James Bloor, Thomas Lennon, Joe Manganiello	
M A R C H	31	Godzilla vs. Kong	Warner Bros. Pictures / Legendary Entertainment / HBO Max	Adam Wingard (director); Eric Pearson, Max Borenstein (screenplay); Alexander Skarsgård, Millie Bobby Brown, Rebecca Hall, Brian Tyree Henry, Shun Oguri, Eiza González, Julian Dennison, Lance Reddick, Kyle Chandler, Demián Bichir	

== April–June ==
Opening		Title	Company credits	Cast and crew	Ref.
A P R I L	2	Concrete Cowboy	Netflix	Ricky Staub (director/screenplay); Dan Walser (screenplay); Idris Elba, Caleb McLaughlin, Jharrel Jerome, Byron Bowers, Lorraine Toussaint, Clifford "Method Man" Smith	
A P R I L	2	The Unholy	Screen Gems / Ghost House Pictures	Evan Spiliotopoulos (director/screenplay); Jeffrey Dean Morgan, Katie Aselton, William Sadler, Cricket Brown, Diogo Morgado, Cary Elwes	
A P R I L	2	Every Breath You Take	Vertical Entertainment	Vaughn Stein (director); David Murray (screenplay); Casey Affleck, Sam Claflin, Veronica Ferres, India Eisley, Michelle Monaghan	
A P R I L	2	Shiva Baby	Utopia	Emma Seligman (director/screenplay); Rachel Sennott, Molly Gordon, Polly Draper, Danny Deferrari, Fred Melamed, Dianna Agron	
A P R I L	2	The Girl Who Believes in Miracles	Atlas Distribution Company	Richard Correll (director/screenplay); G.M. Mercier (screenplay); Mira Sorvino, Austyn Johnson, Kevin Sorbo, Peter Coyote	
A P R I L	2	The Believer	Freestyle Releasing	Shan Serafin (director/screenplay); Aidan Bristow, Sophie Kargman, Susan Wilder, Lindsay Ginter, Robbie Goldstein, Billy Zane	
A P R I L	4	Dawn of the Beast	Uncork'd Entertainment	Bruce Wemple (director); Anna Shields (screenplay); Francesca Anderson, Adrián Burke, Chris Cimperman, Ariella Mastroianni, Roger Mayer	
A P R I L	9	Voyagers	Lionsgate / AGC Studios / Thunder Road Films / Ingenious Media	Neil Burger (director/screenplay); Tye Sheridan, Lily-Rose Depp, Fionn Whitehead, Colin Farrell, Chanté Adams, Isaac Hempstead Wright, Viveik Kalra, Archie Madekwe, Quintessa Swindell	
A P R I L	9	Thunder Force	Netflix	Ben Falcone (director/screenplay); Melissa McCarthy, Octavia Spencer, Bobby Cannavale, Pom Klementieff, Taylor Mosby, Melissa Leo, Jason Bateman	
A P R I L	16	Arlo the Alligator Boy	Netflix / Netflix Animation / Titmouse, Inc.	Ryan Crego (director/screenplay); Clay Senechal (screenplay); Michael J. Woodard, Mary Lambert, Haley Tju, Jonathan Van Ness, Brett Gelman, Tony Hale, Annie Potts, Flea, Jennifer Coolidge, Vincent Rodriguez III	
A P R I L	16	Monday	IFC Films	Argyris Papadimitropoulos (director/screenplay); Rob Hayes (screenplay); Sebastian Stan, Denise Gough, Yorgos Pirpassopoulos, Dominique Tipper	
A P R I L	16	In the Earth	Neon	Ben Wheatley (director/screenplay); Joel Fry, Reece Shearsmith, Hayley Squires, Ellora Torchia, John Hollingworth, Mark Monero	
A P R I L	22	Stowaway	Netflix / XYZ Films	Joe Penna (director/screenplay); Ryan Morrison (screenplay); Anna Kendrick, Daniel Dae Kim, Shamier Anderson, Toni Collette	
A P R I L	23	Mortal Kombat	Warner Bros. Pictures / New Line Cinema / Atomic Monster / HBO Max	Simon McQuoid (director); Greg Russo, David Callaham (screenplay); Lewis Tan, Jessica McNamee, Josh Lawson, Tadanobu Asano, Mehcad Brooks, Ludi Lin, Chin Han, Joe Taslim, Hiroyuki Sanada	
A P R I L	23	Vanquish	Lionsgate	George Gallo (director); Samuel Bartlett (screenplay); Ruby Rose, Morgan Freeman	
A P R I L	23	Together Together	Bleecker Street	Nikole Beckwith (director/screenplay); Ed Helms, Patti Harrison, Tig Notaro	
A P R I L	23	We Broke Up	Vertical Entertainment	Jeff Rosenberg (director/screenplay); Laura Jacqmin (screenplay); William Jackson Harper, Aya Cash	
A P R I L	23	The Deep Ones	123 Go Films	Chad Ferrin (director/screenplay); Gina La Piana, Robert Miano, Johann Urb, Silvia Spross, Jackie Debatin, Nicolas Coster	
A P R I L	28	Things Heard & Seen	Netflix / Likely Story	Shari Springer Berman and Robert Pulcini (director/screenplay); Amanda Seyfried, James Norton, Natalia Dyer, F. Murray Abraham	
A P R I L	30	The Mitchells vs. the Machines	Netflix / Columbia Pictures / Sony Pictures Animation	Mike Rianda (director/screenplay); Jeff Rowe (co-director/screenplay); Abbi Jacobson, Danny McBride, Maya Rudolph, Mike Rianda, Olivia Colman, Eric Andre, Fred Armisen, Beck Bennett, John Legend, Chrissy Teigen, Blake Griffin, Conan O'Brien	
A P R I L	30	Without Remorse	Amazon Studios / Paramount Pictures / Skydance Media	Stefano Sollima (director); Taylor Sheridan, Will Staples (screenplay); Michael B. Jordan, Jamie Bell, Jodie Turner-Smith, Lauren London, Brett Gelman, Jacob Scipio, Jack Kesy, Colman Domingo, Guy Pearce	
A P R I L	30	The Virtuoso	Lionsgate	Nick Stagliano (director/screenplay); James C. Wolf (screenplay); Anson Mount, Abbie Cornish, Eddie Marsan, David Morse, Anthony Hopkins	
A P R I L	30	Four Good Days	Vertical Entertainment	Rodrigo García (director/screenplay); Eli Saslow (screenplay); Glenn Close, Mila Kunis, Stephen Root	
A P R I L	30	Separation	Open Road Films / Briarcliff Entertainment	William Brent Bell (director); Nick Amadeus, Josh Braun (screenplay); Rupert Friend, Mamie Gummer, Violet McGraw, Brian Cox	
A P R I L	30	The Resort	Vertical Entertainment	Taylor Chien (director/screenplay); Brock O'Hurn, Avery Pascual, Michael Vlamis, Michelle Randolph, Bianca Haase	
M A Y	7	Wrath of Man	Metro-Goldwyn-Mayer / Miramax	Guy Ritchie (director/screenplay); Ivan Atkinson, Marn Davies (screenplay); Jason Statham, Holt McCallany, Jeffrey Donovan, Josh Hartnett, Laz Alonso, Raúl Castillo, DeObia Oparei, Eddie Marsan, Scott Eastwood, Andy García	
M A Y	7	Monster	Netflix / Bron Creative	Anthony Mandler (director); Radha Blank, Cole Wiley, Janece Shaffer (screenplay); Kelvin Harrison Jr., Jennifer Ehle, Tim Blake Nelson, Nasir "Nas" Jones, Rakim "A$AP Rocky" Mayers, Paul Ben-Victor, John David Washington, Jennifer Hudson, Jeffrey Wright	
M A Y	7	The Paper Tigers	Well Go USA Entertainment	Tran Quoc Bao (director/screenplay); Alain Uy, Ron Yuan, Mykel Shannon Jenkins	
M A Y	7	Mainstream	IFC Films / American Zoetrope	Gia Coppola (director/screenplay); Tom Stuart (screenplay); Andrew Garfield, Maya Hawke, Nat Wolff, Johnny Knoxville, Jason Schwartzman	
M A Y	7	The Water Man	RLJE Films	David Oyelowo (director); Emma Needell (screenplay); David Oyelowo, Rosario Dawson, Lonnie Chavis, Amiah Miller, Alfred Molina, Maria Bello	
M A Y	7	Here Today	Stage 6 Films	Billy Crystal (director/screenplay); Alan Zweibel (screenplay); Billy Crystal, Tiffany Haddish, Penn Badgley, Laura Benanti, Louisa Krause	
M A Y	7	Above Suspicion	Lionsgate	Phillip Noyce (director); Chris Gerolmo (screenplay); Jack Huston, Emilia Clarke, Thora Birch, Johnny Knoxville	
M A Y	7	Reboot Camp	Freestyle Releasing	Ivo Raza (director/screenplay); David Koechner, Ed Begley Jr., Chaz Bono, Ja Rule, Shar Jackson, Eric Roberts	
M A Y	7	Benny Loves You	Epic Pictures Group	Karl Holt (director/screenplay); Karl Holt, Claire Cartwright, David Wayman, George Collie, James Parsons, Lydia Hourihan	
M A Y	9	Oxygen	Netflix	Alexandre Aja (director); Christine LeBlanc (screenplay); Mélanie Laurent, Mathieu Amalric, Malik Zidi	
M A Y	14	Army of the Dead	Netflix / The Stone Quarry	Zack Snyder (director/screenplay); Shay Hatten, Joby Harold (screenplay); Dave Bautista, Ella Purnell, Omari Hardwick, Ana de la Reguera, Theo Rossi, Matthias Schweighöfer, Nora Arnezeder, Hiroyuki Sanada, Tig Notaro, Raúl Castillo, Huma Qureshi, Garret Dillahunt	
M A Y	14	Those Who Wish Me Dead	Warner Bros. Pictures / New Line Cinema / Bron Creative / HBO Max	Taylor Sheridan (director/screenplay); Michael Koryta, Charles Leavitt (screenplay); Angelina Jolie, Nicholas Hoult, Finn Little, Aidan Gillen, Jake Weber, Medina Senghore, Jon Bernthal	
M A Y	14	The Woman in the Window	Netflix / 20th Century Studios / Fox 2000 Pictures	Joe Wright (director); Tracy Letts (screenplay); Amy Adams, Gary Oldman, Anthony Mackie, Fred Hechinger, Wyatt Russell, Brian Tyree Henry, Jennifer Jason Leigh, Julianne Moore	
M A Y	14	Spiral	Lionsgate / Twisted Pictures	Darren Lynn Bousman (director); Josh Stolberg, Pete Goldfinger (screenplay); Chris Rock, Max Minghella, Marisol Nichols, Samuel L. Jackson	
M A Y	14	Georgetown	Vertical Entertainment	Christoph Waltz (director); David Auburn (screenplay); Christoph Waltz, Vanessa Redgrave, Annette Bening, Corey Hawkins	
M A Y	14	Finding You	Roadside Attractions	Brian Baugh (director/screenplay); Rose Reid, Jedidiah Goodacre, Katherine McNamara, Patrick Bergin, Saoirse-Monica Jackson, Judith Hoag, Tom Everett Scott, Vanessa Redgrave	
M A Y	14	The Killing of Two Lovers	Neon	Robert Machoian (director/screenplay); Clayne Crawford, Sepideh Moafi, Chris Coy, Avery Pizzuto, Arri Graham, Ezra Graham	
M A Y	18	616 Wilford Lane	Indican Pictures	Mark S. Allen, Dante Yore (director/screenplay); Howard Burd (screenplay); John Littlefield, Eric Roberts, Alyson Gorske, Stevonte Hart, Eliza Roberts	
M A Y	21	Dream Horse	Bleecker Street / Topic Studios / Film4 / Ingenious Media	Euros Lyn (director); Neil McKay (screenplay); Toni Collette, Damian Lewis, Owen Teale, Joanna Page, Karl Johnson, Steffan Rhodri, Anthony O'Donnell, Nicholas Farrell, Siân Phillips	
M A Y	21	Aquarium of the Dead	The Asylum	Glenn Miller (director); Marc Gottilieb (screenplay); Vivica A. Fox, Eva Ceja, D. C. Douglas, Madeleine Falk, Anthony Jensen, Erica Duke	
M A Y	21	Blast Beat	Stage 6 Films / Vertical Entertainment	Esteban Arango (director/screenplay); Erick Castrillon (screenplay); Moisés Arias, Mateo Arias, Daniel Dae Kim, Kali Uchis, Ashley Jackson, Diane Guerrero, Wilmer Valderrama	
M A Y	28	A Quiet Place Part II	Paramount Pictures / Platinum Dunes / Sunday Night Productions	John Krasinski (director/screenplay); Emily Blunt, Cillian Murphy, Millicent Simmonds, Noah Jupe, Djimon Hounsou, John Krasinski	
M A Y	28	Cruella	Walt Disney Pictures / Disney+	Craig Gillespie (director); Dana Fox, Tony McNamara (screenplay); Emma Stone, Emma Thompson, Joel Fry, Paul Walter Hauser, Emily Beecham, Kirby Howell-Baptiste, Mark Strong	
M A Y	28	Plan B	Hulu	Natalie Morales (director); Prathi Srinivasan, Joshua Levy (screenplay); Kuhoo Verma, Victoria Moroles	
J U N E	1	Changing the Game	Hulu	Michael Barnett (director/screenplay); Amanda C. Griffin, Michael Mahaffie (screenplay); Mack Beggs, Sarah Rose Huckman, Terry Miller, Ngozi Nnaji, Andraya Yearwood	
J U N E	4	Spirit Untamed	Universal Pictures / DreamWorks Animation	Elaine Bogan, Ennio Torresan (directors); Aury Wallington (screenplay); Isabela Merced, Marsai Martin, Mckenna Grace, Julianne Moore, Jake Gyllenhaal, Walton Goggins, Eiza González	
J U N E	4	The Conjuring: The Devil Made Me Do It	Warner Bros. Pictures / New Line Cinema / HBO Max	Michael Chaves (director); David Leslie Johnson-McGoldrick (screenplay); Patrick Wilson, Vera Farmiga, Ruairi O'Connor, Sarah Catherine Hook, Julian Hilliard	
J U N E	4	Gully	Vertical Entertainment	Nabil Elderkin (director); Marcus J. Guillory (screenplay); Jacob Latimore, Charlie Plummer, Jonathan Majors, Kelvin Harrison Jr., Amber Heard, Terrence Howard	
J U N E	4	Flashback	Lionsgate	Christopher MacBride (director/screenplay); Dylan O'Brien, Maika Monroe, Hannah Gross, Emory Cohen, Keir Gilchrist	
J U N E	4	Under the Stadium Lights	Film Bridge International / Saban Films	Todd Randall (director); John Collins, Hamid Torabpour (screenplay); Milo Gibson, Laurence Fishburne, Glenn Morshower, Noel Gugliemi	
J U N E	4	Grace and Grit	Quiver Distribution	Sebastian Siegel (director/screenplay); Mena Suvari, Stuart Townsend, Frances Fisher, Rebekah Graf, Mariel Hemingway, Nick Stahl	
J U N E	8	Awake	Netflix / Entertainment One	Mark Raso (director/screenplay); Joseph Raso (screenplay); Gina Rodriguez, Jennifer Jason Leigh, Barry Pepper, Finn Jones, Gil Bellows	
J U N E	9	Infinite	Paramount+ / Paramount Pictures	Antoine Fuqua (director); Ian Shorr (screenplay); Mark Wahlberg, Chiwetel Ejiofor, Sophie Cookson, Jason Mantzoukas, Rupert Friend, Toby Jones, Dylan O'Brien	
J U N E	11	Peter Rabbit 2: The Runaway	Columbia Pictures / MRC / Animal Logic	Will Gluck (director/screenplay); Patrick Burleigh (screenplay); James Corden, Rose Byrne, Domhnall Gleeson, Margot Robbie, Elizabeth Debicki, Lennie James, David Oyelowo	
J U N E	11	In the Heights	Warner Bros. Pictures / Likely Story / Endeavor Content / HBO Max	Jon M. Chu (director); Quiara Alegría Hudes (screenplay); Anthony Ramos, Corey Hawkins, Leslie Grace, Melissa Barrera, Olga Merediz, Daphne Rubin-Vega, Gregory Diaz IV, Stephanie Beatriz, Dascha Polanco, Jimmy Smits, Lin-Manuel Miranda	
J U N E	11	Wish Dragon	Netflix / Sony Pictures Animation / Tencent Pictures	Chris Appelhans (director/screenplay); Jimmy Wong, John Cho, Constance Wu, Natasha Liu Bordizzo, Jimmy O. Yang, Aaron Yoo, Will Yun Lee, Bobby Lee, Nico Santos, Ronny Chieng	
J U N E	11	The Misfits	The Avenue Entertainment	Renny Harlin (director); Robert Henny, Kurt Wimmer (screenplay); Pierce Brosnan, Rami Jaber, Hermione Corfield, Jamie Chung, Mike d Angelo, Tim Roth, Nick Cannon	
J U N E	11	12 Mighty Orphans	Sony Pictures Classics	Ty Roberts (director/screenplay); Lane Garrison, Kevin Meyer (screenplay); Luke Wilson, Vinessa Shaw, Wayne Knight, Jake Austin Walker, Jacob Lofland, Levi Dylan, Robert Duvall, Martin Sheen	
J U N E	11	The House Next Door: Meet the Blacks 2	Lionsgate	Deon Taylor (director/screenplay); Corey Harrell (screenplay); Mike Epps, Katt Williams, Bresha Webb, Lil Duval, Zulay Henao, Tyrin Turner, Michael Blackson, Andrew Bachelor, Gary Owen, Danny Trejo	
J U N E	11	Queen Bees	Gravitas Ventures	Michael Lembeck (director); Donald Martin (screenplay); Ellen Burstyn, James Caan, Ann-Margret, Jane Curtin, Christopher Lloyd, Loretta Devine	
J U N E	11	DOMINO: Battle of the Bones	Dow Jazz Films	Baron Davis, Carl Reid, Steven V. Vasquez Jr. (directors); Baron Davis, Carl Reid, Pamela Azmi-Andrew (screenplay); David Arquette, Snoop Dogg, Tom Lister Jr., Carlito Olivero	
J U N E	16	Hitman's Wife's Bodyguard	Lionsgate / Millennium Media	Patrick Hughes (director); Tom O'Connor, Brandon Murphy, Phillip Murphy (screenplay); Ryan Reynolds, Samuel L. Jackson, Salma Hayek, Frank Grillo, Richard E. Grant, Antonio Banderas, Morgan Freeman	
J U N E	18	Luca	Disney+ / Walt Disney Pictures / Pixar Animation Studios	Enrico Casarosa (director); Mike Jones, Jesse Andrews (screenplay); Jacob Tremblay, Jack Dylan Grazer, Emma Berman, Saverio Raimondo, Maya Rudolph, Marco Baricelli, Jim Gaffigan, Peter Sohn, Lorenzo Crisci, Marina Massironi, Sandy Martin	
J U N E	18	Fatherhood	Netflix / Columbia Pictures / Bron Creative	Paul Weitz (director/screenplay); Dana Stevens (screenplay); Kevin Hart, Alfre Woodard, Lil Rel Howery, DeWanda Wise, Anthony Carrigan, Melody Hurd, Paul Reiser	
J U N E	18	The Birthday Cake	Screen Media Films	Jimmy Giannopoulos (director/screenplay); Diomedes Raul Bermudez, Shiloh Fernandez (screenplay); Shiloh Fernandez, Val Kilmer, Ewan McGregor, Ashley Benson, Lorraine Bracco, David Mazouz	
J U N E	18	Rita Moreno: Just a Girl Who Decided to Go for It	Roadside Attractions	Mariem Pérez Riera (director/screenplay); Rita Moreno, Eva Longoria, George Chakiris, Gloria Estefan, Héctor Elizondo, Karen Olivo, Justina Machado, Lin-Manuel Miranda, Mitzi Gaynor, Morgan Freeman, Norman Lear, Terrence McNally, Whoopi Goldberg	
J U N E	18	The Sparks Brothers	Focus Features / MRC	Edgar Wright (director/screenplay); Ron Mael, Russell Mael	
J U N E	18	Truman & Tennessee: An Intimate Conversation	Fischio Films / Peaceable Assembly	Lisa Immordino Vreeland (director/screenplay); Jim Parsons, Zachary Quinto	
J U N E	18	Stalker	Vertical Entertainment	Tyler Savage (director/screenplay); Dash Hawkins (screenplay); Christine Ko, Vincent van Horn, Michael Joplin, Dusty Sorg, Carla Valentine, Scott Subiono	
J U N E	18	Love Spreads	Dignity Film Finance / Film Shed	Jamie Adams (director/screenplay); Alia Shawkat, Eiza González, Chanel Cresswell, Nick Helm, Dolly Wells, Tara Lee	
J U N E	18	A Crime on the Bayou	Shout! Studios	Nancy Buirski (director/screenplay); Gary Duncan, Richard Sobol	
J U N E	23	Good on Paper	Netflix / Universal Pictures	Kimmy Gatewood (director); Iliza Shlesinger (screenplay); Iliza Shlesinger, Ryan Hansen, Margaret Cho, Rebecca Rittenhouse	
J U N E	25	F9	Universal Pictures / Original Film / One Race Films / Roth/Kirschenbaum Films	Justin Lin (director/screenplay); Daniel Casey (screenplay); Vin Diesel, John Cena, Michelle Rodriguez, Tyrese Gibson, Chris "Ludacris" Bridges, Jordana Brewster, Nathalie Emmanuel, Sung Kang, Michael Rooker, Helen Mirren, Kurt Russell, Charlize Theron	
J U N E	25	The Ice Road	Netflix	Jonathan Hensleigh (director/screenplay); Liam Neeson, Benjamin Walker, Amber Midthunder, Marcus Thomas, Holt McCallany, Martin Sensmeier, Matt McCoy, Matt Salinger, Laurence Fishburne	
J U N E	25	Werewolves Within	IFC Films / Ubisoft Film & Television	Josh Ruben (director); Mishna Wolff (screenplay); Sam Richardson, Milana Vayntrub, George Basil, Sarah Burns, Michael Chernus, Catherine Curtin, Harvey Guillén, Cheyenne Jackson, Michaela Watkins, Glenn Fleshler	
J U N E	25	False Positive	A24 / Hulu	John Lee (director/screenplay); Ilana Glazer (screenplay); Ilana Glazer, Justin Theroux, Sophia Bush, Josh Hamilton, Pierce Brosnan	
J U N E	25	Lansky	Vertical Entertainment	Eytan Rockaway (director/screenplay); Harvey Keitel, Sam Worthington, AnnaSophia Robb, Minka Kelly, David James Elliott, John Magaro	
J U N E	25	I Carry You with Me	Sony Pictures Classics / Stage 6 Films	Heidi Ewing (director/screenplay); Alan Page Arriaga (screenplay); Armando Espitia, Christian Vázquez, Michelle Rodríguez, Ángeles Cruz, Arcelia Ramírez, Michelle González	
J U N E	25	Mary J. Blige's My Life	Amazon Studios	Vanessa Roth (director/screenplay); Mary J. Blige, Taraji P. Henson, Alicia Keys, Sean Combs	
J U N E	25	Fathom	Apple TV+	Drew Xanthopoulos (director/screenplay); Michelle Fournet, Ellen Garland	
J U N E	25	Rollers	Level 33 Entertainment	Isaiah Smallman (director); Johnny Ray Gill, Kate Cobb, Vicky Jeudy, Kevin Bigley	
J U N E	30	America: The Motion Picture	Netflix / Floyd County Productions	Matt Thompson (director); Dave Callaham (screenplay); Channing Tatum, Jason Mantzoukas, Olivia Munn, Bobby Moynihan, Judy Greer, Will Forte, Raoul Trujillo, Killer Mike, Simon Pegg, Andy Samberg	
J U N E	30	Zola	A24	Janicza Bravo (director/screenplay); Jeremy O. Harris (screenplay); Taylour Paige, Riley Keough, Nicholas Braun, Ari'el Stachel, Colman Domingo	

== July–September ==
Opening		Title	Company credits	Cast and crew	Ref.
J U L Y	1	No Sudden Move	HBO Max / Warner Bros. Pictures	Steven Soderbergh (director); Ed Solomon (screenplay); Don Cheadle, Benicio del Toro, David Harbour, Jon Hamm, Amy Seimetz, Brendan Fraser, Kieran Culkin, Noah Jupe, Craig Grant, Julia Fox, Frankie Shaw, Ray Liotta, Bill Duke	
J U L Y	2	The Tomorrow War	Amazon Studios / Paramount Pictures / Skydance Media	Chris McKay (director); Zach Dean (screenplay); Chris Pratt, Yvonne Strahovski, J. K. Simmons, Betty Gilpin, Sam Richardson, Edwin Hodge, Jasmine Mathews, Ryan Kiera Armstrong, Keith Powers	
J U L Y	2	The Boss Baby: Family Business	Universal Pictures / DreamWorks Animation / Peacock	Tom McGrath (director); Michael McCullers (screenplay); Alec Baldwin, James Marsden, Amy Sedaris, Ariana Greenblatt, Jeff Goldblum, Eva Longoria, Jimmy Kimmel, Lisa Kudrow	
J U L Y	2	The Forever Purge	Universal Pictures / Platinum Dunes / Blumhouse Productions	Everardo Gout (director); James DeMonaco (screenplay); Ana de la Reguera, Tenoch Huerta, Josh Lucas, Cassidy Freeman, Leven Rambin, Alejandro Edda, Will Patton	
J U L Y	2	Fear Street Part One: 1994	Netflix / Chernin Entertainment	Leigh Janiak (director/screenplay); Phil Graziadei (screenplay); Kiana Madeira, Olivia Scott Welch, Benjamin Flores Jr., Julia Rehwald, Fred Hechinger, Ashley Zukerman, Darrell Britt-Gibson, Maya Hawke, Jordana Spiro, Jordyn DiNatale	
J U L Y	2	Summer of Soul	Searchlight Pictures / Hulu	Questlove (director); Stevie Wonder, Nina Simone, Sly and the Family Stone, Gladys Knight & the Pips, Mahalia Jackson, B.B. King, The 5th Dimension	
J U L Y	2	Till Death	Screen Media Films / Millennium Films	S.K. Dale (director); Jason Carvey (screenplay); Megan Fox, Eoin Macken, Callan Mulvey, Jack Roth, Aml Ameen	
J U L Y	2	Let Us In	Samuel Goldwyn Films	Craig Moss (director/screenplay); Joe Callero (screenplay); Mackenzie Moss, Sadie Stanley, Mackenzie Ziegler, Siena Agudong, Tobin Bell	
J U L Y	9	Black Widow	Marvel Studios	Cate Shortland (director); Eric Pearson (screenplay); Scarlett Johansson, Florence Pugh, David Harbour, O-T Fagbenle, Olga Kurylenko, William Hurt, Ray Winstone, Rachel Weisz	
J U L Y	9	Fear Street Part Two: 1978	Netflix / Chernin Entertainment	Leigh Janiak (director/screenplay); Zak Olkewikz (screenplay); Sadie Sink, Emily Rudd, Ryan Simpkins, McCabe Slye, Ted Sutherland, Jordana Spiro, Gillian Jacobs, Kiana Madeira, Benjamin Flores Jr., Ashley Zukerman, Olivia Scott Welch, Jordyn DiNatale	
J U L Y	9	Summertime	Good Deed Entertainment / Los Angeles Media Fund	Carlos López Estrada (director); Dave Harris (screenplay); Tyris Winter, Marquesha Babers, Maia Mayor, Austin Antoine, Bryce Banks	
J U L Y	15	Gunpowder Milkshake	Netflix / StudioCanal / STXfilms / The Picture Company	Navot Papushado (director/screenplay); Ehud Lavski (screenplay); Karen Gillan, Lena Headey, Carla Gugino, Chloe Coleman, Michelle Yeoh, Angela Bassett, Paul Giamatti	
J U L Y	16	Space Jam: A New Legacy	Warner Bros. Pictures / Warner Animation Group / HBO Max	Malcolm D. Lee (director); Juel Taylor, Tony Rettenmaier, Keenan Coogler, Terence Nance, Jesse Gordon, Celeste Ballard (screenplay); LeBron James, Don Cheadle, Khris Davis, Sonequa Martin-Green, Cedric Joe, Jeff Bergman, Eric Bauza, Zendaya	
J U L Y	16	Escape Room: Tournament of Champions	Columbia Pictures / Original Film	Adam Robitel (director); Will Honley, Maria Melnik, Daniel Tuch, Oren Uziel (screenplay); Taylor Russell, Logan Miller, Indya Moore, Holland Roden, Thomas Cocquerel, Carlito Olivero, Isabelle Fuhrman	
J U L Y	16	Fear Street Part Three: 1666	Netflix / Chernin Entertainment	Leigh Janiak (director/screenplay); Phil Graziadei (screenplay); Kiana Madeira, Ashley Zukerman, Gillian Jacobs, Olivia Scott Welch, Benjamin Flores Jr., Darrell Britt-Gibson, Fred Hechinger, Julia Rehwald, Sadie Sink, Emily Rudd, McCabe Slye, Jordana Spiro, Jordyn DiNatale	
J U L Y	16	Die in a Gunfight	Lionsgate	Colin Schiffli (director); Andrew Barrer, Gabriel Ferrari (screenplay); Alexandra Daddario, Diego Boneta, Justin Chatwin, Wade Allain-Marcus, Billy Crudup, Emmanuelle Chriqui, Travis Fimmel	
J U L Y	16	Pig	Neon / Endeavour Content	Michael Sarnoski (director/screenplay); Nicolas Cage, Alex Wolff, Adam Arkin	
J U L Y	16	Out of Death	Vertical Entertainment	Mike Burns (director); Bill Lawrence (screenplay); Bruce Willis, Jaime King, Lala Kent	
J U L Y	16	Roadrunner: A Film About Anthony Bourdain	Focus Features	Morgan Neville (director/screenplay); Caitrin Rogers (screenplay); Anthony Bourdain	
J U L Y	20	How It Ends	American International Pictures	Daryl Wein, Zoe Lister-Jones (director/screenplay); Zoe Lister-Jones, Cailee Spaeny, Olivia Wilde, Fred Armisen, Helen Hunt, Lamorne Morris, Nick Kroll	
J U L Y	21	Trollhunters: Rise of the Titans	Netflix / DreamWorks Animation	Johane Matte, Andrew L. Schmidt, Francisco Ruiz Velasco (directors); Guillermo del Toro, Marc Guggenheim, The Hageman Brothers (screenplay); Emile Hirsch, Lexi Medrano, Charlie Saxton, Kelsey Grammer, Fred Tatasciore, Colin O'Donoghue, Diego Luna, Tatiana Maslany, Steven Yeun, Cole Sand, Alfred Molina, Nick Frost, Nick Offerman	
J U L Y	23	Snake Eyes: G.I. Joe Origins	Paramount Pictures / Metro-Goldwyn-Mayer / Skydance Media / Entertainment One	Robert Schwentke (director); Evan Spiliotopoulos, Joe Shrapnel, Anna Waterhouse (screenplay); Henry Golding, Andrew Koji, Úrsula Corberó, Samara Weaving, Iko Uwais, Haruka Abe, Takehiro Hira, Peter Mensah	
J U L Y	23	Old	Universal Pictures / Perfect World Pictures / Blinding Edge Pictures	M. Night Shyamalan (director/screenplay); Gael García Bernal, Vicky Krieps, Rufus Sewell, Alex Wolff, Thomasin McKenzie, Abbey Lee, Nikki Amuka-Bird, Ken Leung, Eliza Scanlen, Aaron Pierre, Embeth Davidtz, Emun Elliott	
J U L Y	23	Joe Bell	Roadside Attractions / Nine Stories Productions	Reinaldo Marcus Green (director); Diana Ossana, Larry McMurtry (screenplay); Mark Wahlberg, Reid Miller, Connie Britton, Gary Sinise	
J U L Y	23	Jolt	Amazon Studios / Millennium Media	Tanya Wexler (director); Scott Wascha (screenwriter); Kate Beckinsale, Bobby Cannavale, Laverne Cox, Stanley Tucci, Jai Courtney, Susan Sarandon	
J U L Y	23	Midnight in the Switchgrass	Lionsgate	Randall Emmett (director); Alan Horsnail (screenplay); Megan Fox, Bruce Willis, Emile Hirsch, Machine Gun Kelly, Lukas Haas	
J U L Y	23	Broken Diamonds	FilmRise / Black Label Media	Peter Sattler (director); Steve Waverly (screenplay); Ben Platt, Lola Kirke, Yvette Nicole Brown, Alphonso McAuley, Lynda Boyd	
J U L Y	23	Val	Amazon Studios / A24	Leo Scott, Ting Poo (directors); Val Kilmer	
J U L Y	23	Ailey	Neon	Jamila Wignot (director)	
J U L Y	30	Jungle Cruise	Walt Disney Pictures / Davis Entertainment / Seven Bucks Productions / Disney+	Jaume Collet-Serra (director); Michael Green, Glenn Ficarra, John Requa (screenplay); Dwayne Johnson, Emily Blunt, Édgar Ramírez, Jack Whitehall, Jesse Plemons, Paul Giamatti	
J U L Y	30	Stillwater	Focus Features / DreamWorks Pictures / Participant	Tom McCarthy (director/screenplay); Marcus Hinchey, Thomas Bidegain, Noé Debré (screenplay); Matt Damon, Camille Cottin, Abigail Breslin	
J U L Y	30	The Green Knight	A24 / Bron Creative	David Lowery (director/screenplay); Dev Patel, Alicia Vikander, Joel Edgerton, Sarita Choudhury, Sean Harris, Ralph Ineson, Barry Keoghan, Erin Kellyman, Kate Dickie	
J U L Y	30	Nine Days	Sony Pictures Classics	Edson Oda (director/screenplay); Winston Duke, Zazie Beetz, Benedict Wong, Tony Hale, Bill Skarsgård	
J U L Y	30	Ride the Eagle	Decal / JTJ Films	Trent O'Donnell (director/screenplay); Jake Johnson (screenplay); Jake Johnson, D'Arcy Carden, J.K. Simmons, Susan Sarandon	
J U L Y	30	The Evening Hour	Strand Releasing	Braden King (director); Elizabeth Palmore (screenplay); Philip Ettinger, Stacy Martin, Cosmo Jarvis, Michael Trotter, Kerry Bishé, Lili Taylor	
J U L Y	30	Lorelei	Vertical Entertainment	Sabrina Doyle (director/screenplay); Pablo Schreiber, Jena Malone	
J U L Y	30	Enemies of the State	IFC Films	Sonia Kennebeck (director)	
A U G U S T	6	The Suicide Squad	Warner Bros. Pictures / DC Films / Atlas Entertainment / HBO Max	James Gunn (director/screenplay); Idris Elba, Margot Robbie, John Cena, Joel Kinnaman, Sylvester Stallone, Viola Davis, David Dastmalchian, Daniela Melchior, Michael Rooker, Jai Courtney, Peter Capaldi, Alice Braga, Pete Davidson, Nathan Fillion, Sean Gunn, Flula Borg, Mayling Ng	
A U G U S T	6	Naked Singularity	Screen Media Films / Scott Free Productions	Chase Palmer (director/screenplay); David Matthews (screenplay); John Boyega, Olivia Cooke, Bill Skarsgård, Ed Skrein, Linda Lavin, Tim Blake Nelson	
A U G U S T	6	John and the Hole	IFC Films	Pascual Sisto (director); Nicolás Giacobone (screenplay); Charlie Shotwell, Michael C. Hall, Jennifer Ehle, Taissa Farmiga	
A U G U S T	6	Vivo	Netflix / Columbia Pictures / Sony Pictures Animation	Kirk DeMicco (director); Quiara Alegría Hudes (screenplay); Lin-Manuel Miranda, Ynairaly Simo, Zoe Saldaña, Juan de Marcos González, Michael Rooker, Brian Tyree Henry, Nicole Byer, Gloria Estefan	
A U G U S T	6	Playing God	Vertical Entertainment	Scott Brignac (director/screenplay); Hannah Kasulka, Luke Benward, Jude Demorest, Marc Menchaca, Alan Tudyk, Michael McKean	
A U G U S T	6	Swan Song	Magnolia Pictures	Todd Stephens (director/screenplay); Udo Kier, Jennifer Coolidge, Linda Evans, Michael Urie, Ira Hawkins, Stephanie McVay	
A U G U S T	6	She Ball	Redbox Entertainment	Nick Cannon (director/screenplay); Glenda L. Richardson (screenplay); Nick Cannon, Chris Brown, Jaliyuh Manuel, K.D. Aubert, Rebecca De Mornay, Tammy Brawner, Evan Ross	
A U G U S T	11	The Kissing Booth 3	Netflix	Vince Marcello (director/screenplay); Jay Arnold (screenplay); Joey King, Joel Courtney, Jacob Elordi, Taylor Zakhar Perez, Maisie Richardson-Sellers, Meganne Young, Molly Ringwald	
A U G U S T	12	Homeroom	Hulu	Peter Nicks (director)	
A U G U S T	13	Free Guy	20th Century Studios / 21 Laps Entertainment / Maximum Effort	Shawn Levy (director); Matt Lieberman, Zak Penn (screenplay); Ryan Reynolds, Jodie Comer, Lil Rel Howery, Utkarsh Ambudkar, Joe Keery, Taika Waititi	
A U G U S T	13	Respect	Metro-Goldwyn-Mayer / Bron Creative	Liesl Tommy (director); Tracey Scott Wilson (screenplay); Jennifer Hudson, Forest Whitaker, Marlon Wayans, Audra McDonald, Marc Maron, Tituss Burgess, Mary J. Blige	
A U G U S T	13	Beckett	Netflix / Rai Cinema	Ferdinando Cito Filomarino (director); Kevin A. Rice (screenplay); John David Washington, Boyd Holbrook, Vicky Krieps, Alicia Vikander	
A U G U S T	13	Don't Breathe 2	Screen Gems / Stage 6 Films / Ghost House Pictures	Rodo Sayagues (director/screenplay); Fede Álvarez (screenplay); Stephen Lang, Brendan Sexton III, Madelyn Grace	
A U G U S T	13	CODA	Apple TV+ / Pathé Films	Sian Heder (director/screenplay); Emilia Jones, Eugenio Derbez, Troy Kotsur, Ferdia Walsh-Peelo, Daniel Durant, Marlee Matlin	
A U G U S T	13	Not Going Quietly	Greenwich Entertainment	Nicholas Bruckman (director/screenplay); Amanda Roddy (screenplay)	
A U G U S T	13	Dramarama	Ambrosia Pictures	Jonathan Wysocki (director/screenplay); Nick Pugliese, Anna Grace Barlow, Megan Suri, Nico Greetham, Danielle Kay, Zak Henri	
A U G U S T	20	Reminiscence	Warner Bros. Pictures / FilmNation Entertainment / HBO Max	Lisa Joy (director/screenplay); Hugh Jackman, Rebecca Ferguson, Thandiwe Newton, Cliff Curtis, Marina de Tavira, Daniel Wu	
A U G U S T	20	The Protégé	Lionsgate / Millennium Media / Ingenious Media	Martin Campbell (director); Richard Wenk (screenplay); Michael Keaton, Maggie Q, Samuel L. Jackson, Robert Patrick	
A U G U S T	20	The Night House	Searchlight Pictures	David Bruckner (director); Ben Collins, Luke Piotrowski (screenplay); Rebecca Hall, Sarah Goldberg, Evan Jonigkeit, Stacy Martin, Vondie Curtis-Hall	
A U G U S T	20	The Loud House Movie	Netflix Animation / Nickelodeon Movies	Dave Needham (director); Asher Bishop, David Tennant, Michelle Gomez, Jill Talley, Brian Stepanek, Catherine Taber, Liliana Mumy, Nika Futterman, Cristina Pucelli, Jessica DiCicco, Grey Griffin, Lara Jill Miller, Katy Townsend, Andre Robinson	
A U G U S T	20	Sweet Girl	Netflix	Brian Andrew Mendoza (director); Philip Eisner, Gregg Hurwitz (screenplay); Jason Momoa, Isabela Merced, Manuel Garcia-Rulfo, Raza Jaffrey, Justin Bartha, Lex Scott Davis, Michael Raymond-James, Adria Arjona, Amy Brenneman	
A U G U S T	20	Flag Day	Metro-Goldwyn-Mayer	Sean Penn (director); Jez Butterworth, John-Henry Butterworth (screenplay); Dylan Penn, Sean Penn, Katheryn Winnick, Eddie Marsan, Josh Brolin, Regina King	
A U G U S T	20	Cryptozoo	Magnolia Pictures	Dash Shaw (director/screenplay); Lake Bell, Michael Cera, Angeliki Papoulia, Zoe Kazan, Peter Stormare, Grace Zabriskie, Louisa Krause, Thomas Jay Ryan, Alex Karpovsky	
A U G U S T	20	Habit	Lionsgate / Voltage Pictures	Janell Shirtcliff (director); Suki Kaiser (screenplay); Josie Ho, Bella Thorne, Gavin Rossdale, Hana Mae Lee, Paris Jackson	
A U G U S T	20	Demonic	IFC Midnight / AGC Studios	Neill Blomkamp (director/screenplay); Carly Pope, Chris William Martin, Michael Rogers, Nathalie Boltt, Terry Chen	
A U G U S T	20	Annette	Amazon Studios / Arte France Cinéma / UGC / RTBF (Télévision Belge) / Piano	Leos Carax (director/screenplay); Ron Mael, Russell Mael (screenplay); Adam Driver, Marion Cotillard, Simon Helberg, Devyn McDowell, Angèle	
A U G U S T	20	Risen	Vertical Entertainment	Eddie Arya (director/screenplay); Caroline McQuade, Kenneth Trujillo, Wassim Hawat, Buffy Anne Littaua, Nicole Sharrock, Melissa Brattoni, Anthony Moisset, Marcus Johnson	
A U G U S T	25	The Witcher: Nightmare of the Wolf	Netflix / Studio Mir	Kwang Il Han (director); Beau DeMayo (screenplay); Theo James, Lara Pulver, Graham McTavish, Mary McDonnell	
A U G U S T	26	Really Love	Netflix	Angel Kristi Williams (director/screenplay); Felicia Pride (screenplay); Kofi Siriboe, Yootha Wong-Loi-Sing, Blair Underwood, Uzo Aduba, Tristan Wilds	
A U G U S T	27	Candyman	Universal Pictures / Metro-Goldwyn-Mayer / Bron Creative / Monkeypaw Productions	Nia DaCosta (director/screenplay); Jordan Peele, Win Rosenfeld (screenplay); Yahya Abdul-Mateen II, Teyonah Parris, Nathan Stewart-Jarrett, Colman Domingo, Kyle Kaminsky, Vanessa Estelle Williams	
A U G U S T	27	Vacation Friends	Hulu / 20th Century Studios	Clay Tarver (director/screenplay); Tom Mullen, Tim Mullen, Jonathan Goldstein, John Francis Daley (screenplay); John Cena, Lil Rel Howery, Yvonne Orji, Meredith Hagner, Lynn Whitfield, Andrew Bachelor	
A U G U S T	27	He's All That	Netflix / Miramax	Mark Waters (director); R. Lee Fleming (screenplay); Addison Rae, Tanner Buchanan, Madison Pettis, Rachael Leigh Cook, Peyton Meyer, Matthew Lillard	
A U G U S T	27	No Man of God	RLJE Films	Amber Sealey (director); C. Robert Cargill (screenplay); Elijah Wood, Luke Kirby, Aleksa Palladino, Robert Patrick	
A U G U S T	27	Rushed	Vertical Entertainment	Vibeke Muasya (director); Siobhan Fallon Hogan (screenplay), Siobhan Fallon Hogan, Robert Patrick, Jake Weary, Peri Gilpin	
S E P T E M B E R	2	Afterlife of the Party	Netflix	Stephen Herek (director); Carrie Freedle (screenplay); Victoria Justice, Midori Francis, Timothy Renouf, Adam Garcia, Gloria Garcia, Spencer Sutherland	
S E P T E M B E R	3	Shang-Chi and the Legend of the Ten Rings	Marvel Studios	Destin Daniel Cretton (director/screenplay); David Callaham, Andrew Lanham (screenplay); Simu Liu, Awkwafina, Meng'er Zhang, Fala Chen, Florian Munteanu, Benedict Wong, Michelle Yeoh, Ben Kingsley, Tony Leung	
S E P T E M B E R	3	Cinderella	Amazon Studios / Sony Pictures / Fulwell 73	Kay Cannon (director/screenwriter); Camila Cabello, Idina Menzel, Nicholas Galitzine, Minnie Driver, Pierce Brosnan, Billy Porter	
S E P T E M B E R	3	Worth	Netflix	Sara Colangelo (director); Max Borenstein (screenplay); Michael Keaton, Stanley Tucci, Amy Ryan, Tate Donovan, Shunori Ramanathan, Laura Benanti, Marc Maron	
S E P T E M B E R	3	The Gateway	Lionsgate	Michele Civetta (director/screenplay); Alexander Felix Bendaña, Andrew Levitas (screenplay); Shea Whigham, Olivia Munn, Frank Grillo, Bruce Dern, Keith David	
S E P T E M B E R	3	Wild Indian	Vertical Entertainment	Lyle Mitchell Corbine Jr. (director/screenplay); Michael Greyeyes, Chaske Spencer, Jesse Eisenberg, Kate Bosworth	
S E P T E M B E R	3	We Need to Do Something	IFC Films	Sean King O'Grady (director); Max Booth III (screenplay); Sierra McCormick, Vinessa Shaw, Pat Healy, Ozzy Osbourne	
S E P T E M B E R	3	Tango Shalom	Vision Films	Gabriel Bologna (director); Joseph Bologna, Jos Laniado, Claudio Laniado (screenplay); Jos Laniado, Karina Smirnoff, Renée Taylor, Lainie Kazan, Judi Beecher, Claudio Laniado	
S E P T E M B E R	10	Kate	Netflix / 87North Productions	Cedric Nicolas-Troyan (director); Umair Aleem (screenplay); Mary Elizabeth Winstead, Miku Martineau, Woody Harrelson, Tadanobu Asano, Michiel Huisman, Miyavi, Jun Kunimura	
S E P T E M B E R	10	Everybody's Talking About Jamie	Amazon Studios / Regency Enterprises / Film4	Jonathan Butterell (director); Tom MacRae (screenplay); Max Harwood, Sarah Lancashire, Lauren Patel, Shobna Gulati, Ralph Ineson, Adeel Akhtar, Samuel Bottomley, Sharon Horgan, Richard E. Grant	
S E P T E M B E R	10	Malignant	Warner Bros. Pictures / New Line Cinema / HBO Max	James Wan (director); Akela Cooper (screenplay); Annabelle Wallis, Maddie Hasson, George Young, Michole Briana White, Jacqueline McKenzie	
S E P T E M B E R	10	Queenpins	STXfilms / AGC Studios	Aron Gaudet, Gita Pullapilly (directors/screenplay); Kristen Bell, Kirby Howell-Baptiste, Paul Walter Hauser, Bebe Rexha, Vince Vaughn	
S E P T E M B E R	10	The Card Counter	Focus Features	Paul Schrader (director/screenplay); Oscar Isaac, Tiffany Haddish, Tye Sheridan, Willem Dafoe	
S E P T E M B E R	10	Come from Away	Apple TV+ / Entertainment One	Christopher Ashley (director); Irene Sankoff, David Hein (screenplay); Petrina Bromley, Jenn Colella, De'Lon Grant, Joel Hatch, Tony LePage, Caesar Samayoa, Q. Smith, Astrid Van Wieren, Emily Walton, Jim Walton, Sharon Wheatley, Paul Whitty	
S E P T E M B E R	10	The Voyeurs	Amazon Studios	Michael Mohan (director/screenplay); Sydney Sweeney, Justice Smith, Ben Hardy, Natasha Liu Bordizzo	
S E P T E M B E R	10	Small Engine Repair	Vertical Entertainment	John Pollono (director/screenplay); Jon Bernthal, Shea Whigham, Jordana Spiro, John Pollono, Ciara Bravo, Spencer House	
S E P T E M B E R	10	Language Lessons	Shout! Studios	Natalie Morales (director/screenplay), Mark Duplass (screenplay), Natalie Morales, Mark Duplass, Desean Terry	
S E P T E M B E R	10	Show Me the Father	Affirm Films	Rick Altizer (director); Sherman Smith, Tony Evans, Steven Kendrick, Alex Kendrick, Deland McCullough, Jim Daly, Eddie George	
S E P T E M B E R	10	Catch the Bullet	Lionsgate	Michael Feifer (director); Jerry Robbins (screenplay); Jay Pickett, Peter Facinelli, Tom Skerritt	
S E P T E M B E R	10	Dating and New York	IFC Films	Jonah Feingold (director/screenplay); Francesca Reale, Jaboukie Young-White, Catherine Cohen, Brian Muller, Jerry Ferrara	
S E P T E M B E R	10	Bad Candy	Dread	Scott B. Hansen, Desiree Connell (director/screenplay); Zach Galligan, Derek Russo, Corey Taylor	
S E P T E M B E R	13	Generation Wrecks	Futuregraph Entertainment	Kevin T. Morales (director/screenplay); Victoria Leigh, Bridget McGarry (screenplay); Bridget McGarry, Victoria Leigh, Okieriete Onaodowan, Emily Bergl, Heather Matarazzo	
S E P T E M B E R	15	My Son	Peacock / STXfilms	Christian Carion (director/screenplay); Laurie Irrmann (screenplay); James McAvoy, Claire Foy, Gary Lewis, Tom Cullen	
S E P T E M B E R	15	Nightbooks	Netflix / Ghost House Pictures	David Yarovesky (director); Mikki Daughtry, Tobias Iaconis (screenplay); Winslow Fegley, Lidya Jewett, Krysten Ritter	
S E P T E M B E R	17	The Starling	Netflix / Entertainment One	Theodore Melfi (director); Matt Harris (screenplay); Melissa McCarthy, Chris O'Dowd, Timothy Olyphant, Daveed Diggs, Skyler Gisondo, Laura Harrier, Rosalind Chao, Loretta Devine, Kevin Kline	
S E P T E M B E R	17	The Eyes of Tammy Faye	Searchlight Pictures / Freckle Films / MWM Studios	Michael Showalter (director); Abe Sylvia (screenplay); Jessica Chastain, Andrew Garfield, Cherry Jones, Vincent D'Onofrio	
S E P T E M B E R	17	Cry Macho	Warner Bros. Pictures / Malpaso Productions / HBO Max	Clint Eastwood (director); Nick Schenk, N. Richard Nash (screenplay); Clint Eastwood, Dwight Yoakam, Eduardo Minett	
S E P T E M B E R	17	Copshop	Open Road Films	Joe Carnahan (director/screenplay); Kurt McLeod (screenplay); Gerard Butler, Frank Grillo, Alexis Louder, Toby Huss	
S E P T E M B E R	17	Blue Bayou	Focus Features / Entertainment One	Justin Chon (director/screenplay); Justin Chon, Alicia Vikander, Mark O'Brien, Linh Dan Pham, Sydney Kowalske, Vondie Curtis-Hall, Emory Cohen	
S E P T E M B E R	17	Prisoners of the Ghostland	RLJE Films	Sion Sono (director); Aaron Hendry, Reza Sixo Safai (screenplay); Nicolas Cage, Sofia Boutella, Bill Moseley, Nick Cassavetes, Tak Sakaguchi, Ed Skrein	
S E P T E M B E R	17	Best Sellers	Screen Media Films	Lina Roessler (director); Anthony Grieco (screenplay); Michael Caine, Aubrey Plaza, Scott Speedman, Ellen Wong, Veronica Ferres, Cary Elwes	
S E P T E M B E R	17	Lady of the Manor	Lionsgate	Justin Long, Christian Long (directors/screenplay); Melanie Lynskey, Judy Greer, Justin Long, Ryan Phillippe, Luis Guzmán	
S E P T E M B E R	17	The Nowhere Inn	IFC Films / Topic Studios	Bill Benz (director); Annie Clark, Carrie Brownstein (screenplay); Annie Clark, Carrie Brownstein, Dakota Johnson	
S E P T E M B E R	17	My Name is Pauli Murray	Amazon Studios / Participant	Betsy West, Julie Cohen (director); Talleah Bridges McMahon, Julie Cohen, Betsy West, Cinque Northern (screenplay)	
S E P T E M B E R	17	The Killing of Kenneth Chamberlain	Gravitas Ventures	David Midell (director/screenplay); Frankie Faison, Steve O'Connell, Enrico Natale, Ben Marten, LaRoyce Hawkins, Anika Noni Rose	
S E P T E M B E R	23	Intrusion	Netflix	Adam Salky (director); Chris Sparling (screenplay); Freida Pinto, Logan Marshall-Green, Robert John Burke	
S E P T E M B E R	24	My Little Pony: A New Generation	Netflix / Entertainment One / Boulder Media	Robert Cullen, Jose Ucha (directors); Gillian Berrow, Tim Sullivan (screenplay); Vanessa Hudgens, Kimiko Glenn, James Marsden, Sofia Carson, Liza Koshy, Ken Jeong, Elizabeth Perkins, Jane Krakowski, Michael McKean, Phil LaMarr	
S E P T E M B E R	24	Dear Evan Hansen	Universal Pictures / Perfect World Pictures	Stephen Chbosky (director); Steven Levenson (screenplay); Ben Platt, Kaitlyn Dever, Amandla Stenberg, Nik Dodani, Colton Ryan, Danny Pino, Julianne Moore, Amy Adams	
S E P T E M B E R	24	The Guilty	Netflix / Bold Films / Nine Stories Productions	Antoine Fuqua (director); Nic Pizzolatto (screenplay); Jake Gyllenhaal, Ethan Hawke, Riley Keough, Christina Vidal, Eli Goree, Da'Vine Joy Randolph, Paul Dano, Peter Sarsgaard	
S E P T E M B E R	24	Birds of Paradise	Amazon Studios	Sarah Adina Smith (director/screenplay); Kristine Froseth, Diana Silvers, Jacqueline Bisset, Stav Strashko	
S E P T E M B E R	30	After We Fell	Voltage Pictures	Castille Landon (director); Sharon Soboil (screenplay); Josephine Langford, Hero Fiennes Tiffin, Louise Lombard, Rob Estes, Arielle Kebbel, Chance Perdomo, Frances Turner, Kiana Madeira, Carter Jenkins, Stephen Moyer, Mira Sorvino	

== October–December ==
Opening		Title	Company credits	Cast and crew	Ref.
O C T O B E R	1	Venom: Let There Be Carnage	Columbia Pictures / Marvel Entertainment / Tencent Pictures	Andy Serkis (director), Kelly Marcel (screenplay); Tom Hardy, Michelle Williams, Naomie Harris, Reid Scott, Stephen Graham, Woody Harrelson	
O C T O B E R	1	The Many Saints of Newark	Warner Bros. Pictures / New Line Cinema / HBO Films / HBO Max	Alan Taylor (director); David Chase, Lawrence Konner (screenplay); Alessandro Nivola, Michael Gandolfini, Leslie Odom Jr., Jon Bernthal, Corey Stoll, Billy Magnussen, Michela De Rossi, John Magaro, Ray Liotta, Vera Farmiga	
O C T O B E R	1	The Addams Family 2	Metro-Goldwyn-Mayer / Bron Creative	Conrad Vernon, Greg Tiernan (directors); Dan Hernandez, Benji Samit, Ben Queen, Susanna Fogel (screenplay); Oscar Isaac, Charlize Theron, Chloë Grace Moretz, Nick Kroll, Javon Walton, Wallace Shawn, Snoop Dogg, Bette Midler, Bill Hader	
O C T O B E R	1	Bingo Hell	Amazon Studios / Blumhouse Television	Gigi Saul Guerrero (director/screenplay); Shane McKenzie, Perry Blackshear (screenplay); L. Scott Caldwell, Adriana Barraza, Joshua Caleb Johnson	
O C T O B E R	1	Black as Night	Amazon Studios / Blumhouse Television	Maritte Lee Go (director); Sherman Payne (screenplay); Ashja Cooper, Theodus Crane, Kenneisha Thompson, Al Mitchell	
O C T O B E R	1	Old Henry	Shout! Studios	Potsy Ponciroli (director/screenplay); Tim Blake Nelson, Scott Haze, Gavin Lewis, Trace Adkins, Stephen Dorff	
O C T O B E R	1	The Jesus Music	Lionsgate	Erwin brothers (director); Jon Erwin (screenplay); Amy Grant, Michael W. Smith, TobyMac, Kirk Franklin, Lauren Daigle	
O C T O B E R	1	Mayday	Magnolia Pictures	Karen Cinorre (director/screenplay); Grace Van Patten, Mia Goth, Havana Rose Liu, Soko, Juliette Lewis	
O C T O B E R	4	God's Not Dead: We the People	Pinnacle Peak Pictures	Vance Null (director); Tommy Blaze (screenplay); David A. R. White, Antonio Sabàto Jr., Francesca Battistelli, William Forsythe, Isaiah Washington, Jeanine Pirro	
O C T O B E R	6	There's Someone Inside Your House	Netflix / 21 Laps Entertainment	Patrick Brice (director); Henry Gayden (screenplay); Sydney Park, Theodore Pellerin, Asjha Cooper, Jesse LaTourette, Diego Josef	
O C T O B E R	8	No Time to Die	Metro-Goldwyn-Mayer / Eon Productions	Cary Joji Fukunaga (director/screenplay); Neal Purvis and Robert Wade, Phoebe Waller-Bridge (screenplay); Daniel Craig, Rami Malek, Léa Seydoux, Lashana Lynch, Ben Whishaw, Naomie Harris, Billy Magnussen, Ana de Armas, David Dencik, Jeffrey Wright, Christoph Waltz, Ralph Fiennes	
O C T O B E R	8	Mass	Bleecker Street	Fran Kranz (director/screenplay); Reed Birney, Ann Dowd, Jason Isaacs, Martha Plimpton	
O C T O B E R	8	South of Heaven	RLJE Films	Aharon Keshales (director/screenplay); Navot Papushado, Kai Mark (screenplay); Jason Sudeikis, Evangeline Lilly, Shea Whigham, Mike Colter	
O C T O B E R	8	The Manor	Amazon Studios / Blumhouse Television	Axelle Carolyn (director/screenwriter); Barbara Hershey, Bruce Davison, Stacey Travis, Ciera Payton, Jill Larson, Mark Steger	
O C T O B E R	8	Madres	Amazon Studios / Blumhouse Television	Ryan Zaragoza (director); Marcella Ochoa, Mario Miscione (screenplay); Elpidia Carrillo, Tenoch Huerta	
O C T O B E R	8	Justin Bieber: Our World	Amazon Studios	Michael D. Ratner (director); Justin Bieber, Hailey Bieber	
O C T O B E R	8	Survive the Game	Lionsgate	James Cullen Bressack (director); Ross Peacock (screenplay); Chad Michael Murray, Bruce Willis	
O C T O B E R	15	Halloween Kills	Universal Pictures / Miramax / Blumhouse Productions / Peacock	David Gordon Green (director/screenplay); Danny McBride, Scott Teems (screenplay); Jamie Lee Curtis, Judy Greer, Andi Matichak, Will Patton, Thomas Mann, Anthony Michael Hall	
O C T O B E R	15	The Last Duel	20th Century Studios / Scott Free Productions / Pearl Street Films	Ridley Scott (director); Nicole Holofcener, Ben Affleck, Matt Damon (screenplay); Matt Damon, Adam Driver, Jodie Comer, Ben Affleck	
O C T O B E R	15	Needle in a Timestack	Lionsgate / Bron Studios	John Ridley (director/screenplay); Leslie Odom Jr., Freida Pinto, Cynthia Erivo, Orlando Bloom	
O C T O B E R	15	Hard Luck Love Song	Roadside Attractions	Justin Corsbie (director/screenplay); Craig Ugoretz (screenplay); Michael Dorman, Sophia Bush, Dermot Mulroney, Eric Roberts, Brian Sacca, Melora Walters, RZA	
O C T O B E R	15	Introducing, Selma Blair	Discovery+ / LD Entertainment	Rachel Fleit (director); Selma Blair	
O C T O B E R	15	The Velvet Underground	Apple TV+ / PolyGram Entertainment	Todd Haynes (director); The Velvet Underground	
O C T O B E R	20	Night Teeth	Netflix	Adam Randall (director); Brent Dillon (screenplay); Jorge Lendeborg Jr., Debby Ryan, Lucy Fry, Alfie Allen, Raúl Castillo, Alexander Ludwig	
O C T O B E R	22	Dune	Warner Bros. Pictures / Legendary Entertainment / HBO Max	Denis Villeneuve (director/screenplay); Jon Spaihts, Eric Roth (screenplay); Timothee Chalamet, Rebecca Ferguson, Oscar Isaac, Josh Brolin, Stellan Skarsgård, Dave Bautista, Stephen McKinley Henderson, Zendaya, Chang Chen, Sharon Duncan-Brewster, Charlotte Rampling, Jason Momoa, Javier Bardem	
O C T O B E R	22	Ron's Gone Wrong	20th Century Studios / 20th Century Animation / Locksmith Animation	Sarah Smith and Jean-Philippe Vine (directors); Peter Baynham and Sarah Smith (screenplay); Zach Galifianakis, Jack Dylan Grazer, Ed Helms, Justice Smith, Rob Delaney, Kylie Cantrall, Ricardo Hurtado and Olivia Colman	
O C T O B E R	22	The French Dispatch	Searchlight Pictures / Indian Paintbrush	Wes Anderson (director/screenplay); Owen Wilson, Benicio del Toro, Tony Revolori, Adrien Brody, Tilda Swinton, Bob Balaban, Henry Winkler, Léa Seydoux, Frances McDormand, Timothée Chalamet, Lyna Khoudri, Christoph Waltz, Rupert Friend, Jeffrey Wright, Liev Schreiber, Mathieu Amalric, Steve Park, Willem Dafoe, Edward Norton, Saoirse Ronan, Bill Murray, Elisabeth Moss, Jason Schwartzman, Fisher Stevens, Anjelica Huston	
O C T O B E R	22	The Harder They Fall	Netflix	Jeymes Samuel (director/screenplay); Boaz Yakin (screenplay); Jonathan Majors, Idris Elba, Zazie Beetz, Regina King, Delroy Lindo, Lakeith Stanfield, RJ Cyler, Danielle Deadwyler, Edi Gathegi, Deon Cole	
O C T O B E R	22	The Electrical Life of Louis Wain	Amazon Studios / StudioCanal / Film4	Will Sharpe (director/screenplay); Simon Stephenson (screenplay); Benedict Cumberbatch, Claire Foy, Andrea Riseborough, Toby Jones, Olivia Colman	
O C T O B E R	22	Warning	Lionsgate	Agata Alexander (director/screenplay); Jason Kaye, Rob Michaelson (screenplay); Alex Pettyfer, Alice Eve, Annabelle Wallis, Benedict Samuel, Charlotte Le Bon, Thomas Jane	
O C T O B E R	27	Passing	Netflix / Film4 / Gamechanger Films / Endeavor Content	Rebecca Hall (director/screenplay); Tessa Thompson, Ruth Negga, André Holland, Bill Camp, Gbenga Akinnagbe, Antoinette Crowe-Legacy, Alexander Skarsgård	
O C T O B E R	27	Hypnotic	Netflix	Matt Angel, Suzanne Coote (director); Richard D'Ovidio (screenplay); Kate Siegel, Jason O'Mara, Dulé Hill	
O C T O B E R	29	Antlers	Searchlight Pictures	Scott Cooper (director/screenplay); Nick Antosca, C. Henry Chaisson (screenplay); Keri Russell, Jesse Plemons, Jeremy T. Thomas, Graham Greene, Scott Haze, Rory Cochrane, Amy Madigan	
O C T O B E R	29	Army of Thieves	Netflix / The Stone Quarry	Matthias Schweighöfer (director); Shay Hatten (screenplay); Matthias Schweighöfer, Nathalie Emmanuel, Ruby O. Fee, Stuart Martin, Guz Khan, Jonathan Cohen	
O C T O B E R	29	A Mouthful of Air	Stage 6 Films	Amy Koppelman (director/screenplay); Amanda Seyfried, Finn Wittrock, Jennifer Carpenter, Michael Gaston, Amy Irving, Paul Giamatti	
O C T O B E R	29	The Souvenir Part II	A24 / BBC Film	Joanna Hogg (director/screenplay); Honor Swinton Byrne, Jaygann Ayeh, Richard Ayoade, Ariane Labed, James Spencer Ashworth, Harris Dickinson, Charlie Heaton, Joe Alwyn, Tilda Swinton	
O C T O B E R	29	Paranormal Activity: Next of Kin	Paramount+ / Paramount Players / Blumhouse Productions	William Eubank (director); Christopher Landon (screenplay); Emily Bader, Roland Buck III, Dan Lippert, Henry Ayres-Brown	
O C T O B E R	29	The Spine of Night	RLJE Films / Shudder	Philip Gelatt, Morgan Galen King (director/screenplay); Richard E. Grant, Lucy Lawless, Patton Oswalt, Betty Gabriel, Joe Manganiello	
O C T O B E R	29	Violet	Relativity Media	Justine Bateman (director/screenplay); Olivia Munn, Luke Bracey, Justin Theroux	
O C T O B E R	29	Heart of Champions	Vertical Entertainment	Michael Mailer (director); Vojin Gjaja (screenplay); Michael Shannon, Alexander Ludwig, Charles Melton	
N O V E M B E R	5	Eternals	Marvel Studios	Chloé Zhao (director/screenplay); Patrick Burleigh (screenplay); Gemma Chan, Richard Madden, Kumail Nanjiani, Lia McHugh, Brian Tyree Henry, Lauren Ridloff, Barry Keoghan, Don Lee, Harish Patel, Bill Skarsgård, Kit Harington, Salma Hayek, Angelina Jolie	
N O V E M B E R	5	Red Notice	Netflix / Flynn Picture Company / Seven Bucks Productions	Rawson Marshall Thurber (director/screenplay); Dwayne Johnson, Ryan Reynolds, Gal Gadot, Chris Diamantopoulos, Ritu Arya	
N O V E M B E R	5	Finch	Apple TV+ / Amblin Entertainment / Walden Media / ImageMovers	Miguel Sapochnik (director); Craig Luck, Igor Powell (screenplay); Tom Hanks, Caleb Landry Jones	
N O V E M B E R	5	Spencer	Neon / Topic Studios / FilmNation Entertainment	Pablo Larraín (director); Steven Knight (screenplay); Kristen Stewart, Timothy Spall, Jack Farthing, Sean Harris, Sally Hawkins	
N O V E M B E R	5	Dangerous	Lionsgate	David Hackl (director); Chris Borrelli (screenplay); Mel Gibson, Scott Eastwood, Tyrese Gibson, Famke Janssen, Kevin Durand	
N O V E M B E R	5	Love Hard	Netflix	Hernán Jiménez (director); Danny Mackey, Rebecca Ewing (screenplay); Nina Dobrev, Jimmy O. Yang, Darren Barnet	
N O V E M B E R	5	The Beta Test	IFC Films	Jim Cummings, PJ McCabe (directors/screenplay); Jim Cummings, Virginia Newcomb, PJ McCabe, Jessie Barr	
N O V E M B E R	10	Clifford the Big Red Dog	Paramount Pictures / Entertainment One / Paramount+	Walt Becker (director); Jay Scherick, David Ronn, Blaise Hemingway (screenplay); Jack Whitehall, Darby Camp, Tony Hale, Sienna Guillory, David Alan Grier, Russell Wong, Kenan Thompson, John Cleese	
N O V E M B E R	12	Tick, Tick... Boom!	Netflix / Imagine Entertainment	Lin-Manuel Miranda (director); Steven Levenson (screenplay); Andrew Garfield, Alexandra Shipp, Robin de Jesús, Joshua Henry, Judith Light, Vanessa Hudgens, Bradley Whitford	
N O V E M B E R	12	Home Sweet Home Alone	Disney+ / 20th Century Studios	Dan Mazer (director); Mikey Day, Streeter Seidell (screenplay); Ellie Kemper, Rob Delaney, Archie Yates, Aisling Bea, Pete Holmes, Kenan Thompson, Ally Maki, Chris Parnell	
N O V E M B E R	12	Apex	RLJE Films	Edward John Drake (director/screenplay); Corey William Large (screenplay); Neal McDonough, Bruce Willis	
N O V E M B E R	16	The Power of the Dog	Netflix / BBC Film / See-Saw Films	Jane Campion (director/screenplay); Benedict Cumberbatch, Kirsten Dunst, Jesse Plemons, Kodi Smit-McPhee, Thomasin McKenzie, Genevieve Lemon, Keith Carradine, Frances Conroy	
N O V E M B E R	16	Bruised	Netflix / Thunder Road Films	Halle Berry (director); Michelle Rosenfarb (screenplay); Halle Berry, Shamier Anderson, Adan Canto, Sheila Atim, Valentina Shevchenko, Stephen McKinley Henderson	
N O V E M B E R	17	The Princess Switch 3: Romancing the Star	Netflix	Michael Rohl (director); Robin Bernheim (screenplay); Vanessa Hudgens, Sam Palladio, Nick Sagar	
N O V E M B E R	19	Ghostbusters: Afterlife	Columbia Pictures / Bron Creative / Ghost Corps	Jason Reitman (director/screenplay); Gil Kenan (screenplay); Carrie Coon, Finn Wolfhard, Mckenna Grace, Paul Rudd, Logan Kim, Celeste O'Connor, Bill Murray, Dan Aykroyd, Ernie Hudson, Sigourney Weaver, Annie Potts	
N O V E M B E R	19	King Richard	Warner Bros. Pictures / Westbrook Studios / HBO Max	Reinaldo Marcus Green (director); Zach Baylin (screenplay); Will Smith, Aunjanue Ellis, Saniyya Sidney, Demi Singleton, Tony Goldwyn, Jon Bernthal, Dylan McDermott	
N O V E M B E R	19	Extinct	Netflix / Tencent Pictures	David Silverman, Raymond S. Persi (directors); Joel H. Cohen, John Frink, Rob LaZebnik (screenplay); Adam DeVine, Rachel Bloom, Zazie Beetz, Ken Jeong, Jim Jefferies, Catherine O'Hara, Tom Hollander, Reggie Watts, Henry Winkler, Benedict Wong, Nick Frost, Alex Borstein	
N O V E M B E R	19	C'mon C'mon	A24	Mike Mills (director/screenplay); Joaquin Phoenix, Gaby Hoffmann, Woody Norman, Scoot McNairy, Molly Webster, Jaboukie Young-White	
N O V E M B E R	19	Black Friday	Screen Media Films	Casey Tebo (director); Andy Greskoviak (screenplay); Devon Sawa, Ivana Baquero, Ryan Lee, Michael Jai White, Bruce Campbell	
N O V E M B E R	19	Zeros and Ones	Lionsgate	Abel Ferrara (director/screenplay); Ethan Hawke, Valerio Mastandrea	
N O V E M B E R	22	Friend of the World	Charybdis Pictures	Brian Patrick Butler (director/screenplay); Nick Young, Alexandra Slade, Michael C. Burgess, Kathryn Schott, Kevin Smith, Luke Pensabene, Neil Raymond Ricco	
N O V E M B E R	24	Encanto	Walt Disney Pictures / Walt Disney Animation Studios	Byron Howard, Jared Bush, Chasire Castro Smith (directors); Chasire Castro Smith, Jared Bush (screenplay); Stephanie Beatriz, María Cecilia Botero, John Leguizamo, Mauro Castillo, Jessica Darrow, Angie Cepeda, Carolina Gaitán, Diane Guerrero, Wilmer Valderrama	
N O V E M B E R	24	House of Gucci	Metro-Goldwyn-Mayer / Bron Creative / Scott Free Productions	Ridley Scott (director); Becky Johnston, Roberto Bentivegna (screenplay); Lady Gaga, Adam Driver, Jared Leto, Jeremy Irons, Jack Huston, Salma Hayek, Al Pacino	
N O V E M B E R	24	The Unforgivable	Netflix / Fortis Films / GK Films	Nora Fingscheidt (director); Peter Craig, Hillary Seitz, Courtenay Miles (screenplay); Sandra Bullock, Vincent D'Onofrio, Jon Bernthal, Richard Thomas, Linda Emond, Aisling Franciosi, Rob Morgan, Viola Davis	
N O V E M B E R	24	Resident Evil: Welcome to Raccoon City	Screen Gems / Constantin Film / Davis Films	Johannes Roberts (director/screenplay); Kaya Scodelario, Hannah John-Kamen, Robbie Amell, Tom Hopper, Avan Jogia, Donal Logue, Neal McDonough	
N O V E M B E R	24	8-Bit Christmas	HBO Max / Warner Bros. Pictures / New Line Cinema	Michael Dowse (director); Kevin Jakubowski (screenplay); Neil Patrick Harris, Winslow Fegley, June Diane Raphael, David Cross, Steve Zahn	
N O V E M B E R	24	The Humans	A24 / Showtime / IAC Films	Stephen Karam (director/screenplay); Richard Jenkins, Jayne Houdyshell, Amy Schumer, Beanie Feldstein, Steven Yeun, June Squibb	
N O V E M B E R	25	South Park: Post Covid	Paramount+ / Comedy Central	Trey Parker (director/screenplay); Matt Stone, Mona Marshall, Kimberly Brooks, Adrien Beard, Delilah Kujala, Betty Boogie	
N O V E M B E R	26	Licorice Pizza	Metro-Goldwyn-Mayer / Focus Features / Bron Creative	Paul Thomas Anderson (director/screenplay); Alana Haim, Cooper Hoffman, Sean Penn, Tom Waits, Bradley Cooper, Benny Safdie	
D E C E M B E R	1	Single All the Way	Netflix / Muse Entertainment	Michael Mayer (director); Chad Hodge (screenplay); Michael Urie, Philemon Chambers, Luke Macfarlane, Barry Bostwick, Kathy Najimy, Jennifer Coolidge	
D E C E M B E R	3	Back to the Outback	Netflix / Netflix Animation / Reel FX Creative Studios	Clare Knight (director); Harry Cripps (director/screenplay); Isla Fisher, Tim Minchin, Eric Bana, Guy Pearce, Miranda Tapsell, Angus Imrie, Keith Urban, Jacki Weaver	
D E C E M B E R	3	Diary of a Wimpy Kid	Disney+ / Walt Disney Pictures / Bardel Entertainment	Swinton O. Scott III (director); Jeff Kinney (screenplay); Brady Noon, Ethan William Childress, Chris Diamantopoulos, Erica Cerra, Hunter Dillon	
D E C E M B E R	3	Encounter	Amazon Studios / Film4 / Raw	Michael Pierce (director/screenplay); Joe Barton (screenplay); Riz Ahmed, Octavia Spencer, Janina Gavankar, Rory Cochrane, Misha Collins, Lucian-River Chauhan, Aditya Geddada	
D E C E M B E R	3	Mixtape	Netflix	Valerie Weiss (director); Stacey Menear (screenplay); Gemma Brooke Allen, Jackson Rathbone, Nick Thune, Julie Bowen	
D E C E M B E R	3	Deadlock	Saban Films	Jared Cohn (director/screenplay); Cam Cannon (screenplay); Patrick Muldoon, Bruce Willis, Matthew Marsden	
D E C E M B E R	10	West Side Story	20th Century Studios / Amblin Entertainment	Steven Spielberg (director); Tony Kushner (screenplay); Ansel Elgort, Rachel Zegler, Ariana DeBose, David Alvarez, Mike Faist, Rita Moreno, Brian d'Arcy James, Corey Stoll	
D E C E M B E R	10	Don't Look Up	Netflix / Hyperobject Industries	Adam McKay (director/screenplay); Leonardo DiCaprio, Jennifer Lawrence, Rob Morgan, Jonah Hill, Mark Rylance, Tyler Perry, Ron Perlman, Timothée Chalamet, Ariana Grande, Scott Mescudi, Himesh Patel, Melanie Lynskey, Cate Blanchett, Meryl Streep	
D E C E M B E R	10	National Champions	STXfilms / Thunder Road Films	Ric Roman Waugh (director); Adam Mervis (screenplay); Stephan James, J. K. Simmons, Alexander Ludwig, Lil Rel Howery, Tim Blake Nelson, Andrew Bachelor, Jeffrey Donovan, David Koechner, Kristin Chenoweth, Timothy Olyphant, Uzo Aduba	
D E C E M B E R	10	Being the Ricardos	Amazon Studios / Escape Artists	Aaron Sorkin (director/screenplay); Nicole Kidman, Javier Bardem, J. K. Simmons, Nina Arianda, Tony Hale, Alia Shawkat, Jake Lacy, Clark Gregg	
D E C E M B E R	10	Red Rocket	A24 / FilmNation Entertainment	Sean Baker (director/screenplay); Chris Bergoch (screenplay); Simon Rex, Bree Elrod, Suzanna Son	
D E C E M B E R	10	The Hating Game	Vertical Entertainment	Peter Hutchings (director); Christina Mengert (screenplay); Lucy Hale, Austin Stowell, Damon Daunno, Sakina Jaffrey, Corbin Bernsen	
D E C E M B E R	14	Rumble	Paramount+ / Paramount Animation / WWE Studios / Walden Media / Reel FX Creative Studios	Hamish Grieve (director/screenplay); Matt Lieberman, Alexandra Bracken (screenplay); Will Arnett, Terry Crews, Geraldine Viswanathan, Fred Melamed, Becky Lynch, Roman Reigns, Ben Schwartz, Jimmy Tatro, Tony Danza	
D E C E M B E R	15	South Park: Post Covid: The Return of Covid	Paramount+ / Comedy Central	Trey Parker (director/screenplay); Matt Stone, Mona Marshall, Kimberly Brooks, Adrien Beard, Delilah Kujala, Betty Boogie	
D E C E M B E R	17	Spider-Man: No Way Home	Columbia Pictures / Marvel Studios	Jon Watts (director); Chris McKenna, Erik Sommers (screenplay); Tom Holland, Benedict Cumberbatch, Zendaya, Jacob Batalon, Jon Favreau, Jamie Foxx, Willem Dafoe, Alfred Molina, Benedict Wong, Tony Revolori, Marisa Tomei, Andrew Garfield, Tobey Maguire	
D E C E M B E R	17	Nightmare Alley	Searchlight Pictures	Guillermo del Toro (director/screenplay); Kim Morgan (screenplay); Bradley Cooper, Cate Blanchett, Toni Collette, Willem Dafoe, Richard Jenkins, Rooney Mara, Ron Perlman, Mary Steenburgen, David Strathairn	
D E C E M B E R	17	The Lost Daughter	Netflix / Endeavor Content	Maggie Gyllenhaal (director/screenplay); Olivia Colman, Dakota Johnson, Jessie Buckley, Paul Mescal, Dagmara Domińczyk, Jack Farthing, Oliver Jackson-Cohen, Peter Sarsgaard, Ed Harris	
D E C E M B E R	17	Swan Song	Apple TV+ / Apple Studios	Benjamin Cleary (director/screenplay); Mahershala Ali, Naomie Harris, Glenn Close, Awkwafina, Adam Beach	
D E C E M B E R	17	The Tender Bar	Amazon Studios	George Clooney (director); William Monahan (screenplay); Ben Affleck, Tye Sheridan, Lily Rabe, Christopher Lloyd, Daniel Ranieri	
D E C E M B E R	17	Mother/Android	Hulu / Miramax	Mattson Tomlin (director/screenplay); Chloë Grace Moretz, Algee Smith, Raúl Castillo	
D E C E M B E R	17	Fortress	Lionsgate	James Cullen Bressack (director); Alan Horsnail (screenplay); Jesse Metcalfe, Bruce Willis, Chad Michael Murray	
D E C E M B E R	22	Sing 2	Universal Pictures / Illumination	Garth Jennings (director/screenplay); Matthew McConaughey, Reese Witherspoon, Scarlett Johansson, Taron Egerton, Tori Kelly, Bobby Cannavale, Nick Kroll, Halsey, Pharrell Williams, Nick Offerman, Letitia Wright, Eric Andre, Chelsea Peretti, Bono	
D E C E M B E R	22	The Matrix Resurrections	Warner Bros. Pictures / Village Roadshow Pictures / HBO Max	Lana Wachowski (director/screenplay); David Mitchell, Aleksandar Hemon (screenplay); Keanu Reeves, Carrie-Anne Moss, Yahya Abdul-Mateen II, Jessica Henwick, Jonathan Groff, Neil Patrick Harris, Priyanka Chopra Jonas, Jada Pinkett-Smith	
D E C E M B E R	22	The King's Man	20th Century Studios / Marv Studios	Matthew Vaughn (director/screenplay); Karl Gajdusek (screenplay); Ralph Fiennes, Gemma Arterton, Rhys Ifans, Matthew Goode, Tom Hollander, Harris Dickinson, Daniel Brühl, Djimon Hounsou, Charles Dance	
D E C E M B E R	25	The Tragedy of Macbeth	Apple TV+ / A24 / IAC Films	Joel Coen (director/screenplay); Denzel Washington, Frances McDormand, Bertie Carvel, Alex Hassell, Corey Hawkins, Harry Melling, Kathryn Hunter, Brendan Gleeson	
D E C E M B E R	25	A Journal for Jordan	Columbia Pictures / Escape Artists / Bron Studios	Denzel Washington (director); Virgil Williams (screenplay); Michael B. Jordan, Chanté Adams, Jalon Christian, Robert Wisdom, Tamara Tunie	
D E C E M B E R	25	American Underdog	Lionsgate	Erwin brothers (directors); Jon Erwin, David Aaron Cohen, Jon Gunn (screenplay); Zachary Levi, Anna Paquin, Dennis Quaid	
D E C E M B E R	26	Memoria	Neon	Apichatpong Weerasethakul (director/acreenplay); Tilda Swinton, Elkin Díaz, Jeanne Balibar, Juan Pablo Urrego, Daniel Giménez Cacho	

== See also ==
- List of 2021 box office number-one films in the United States
- 2021 in the United States
