= Alex McAulay =

American writer

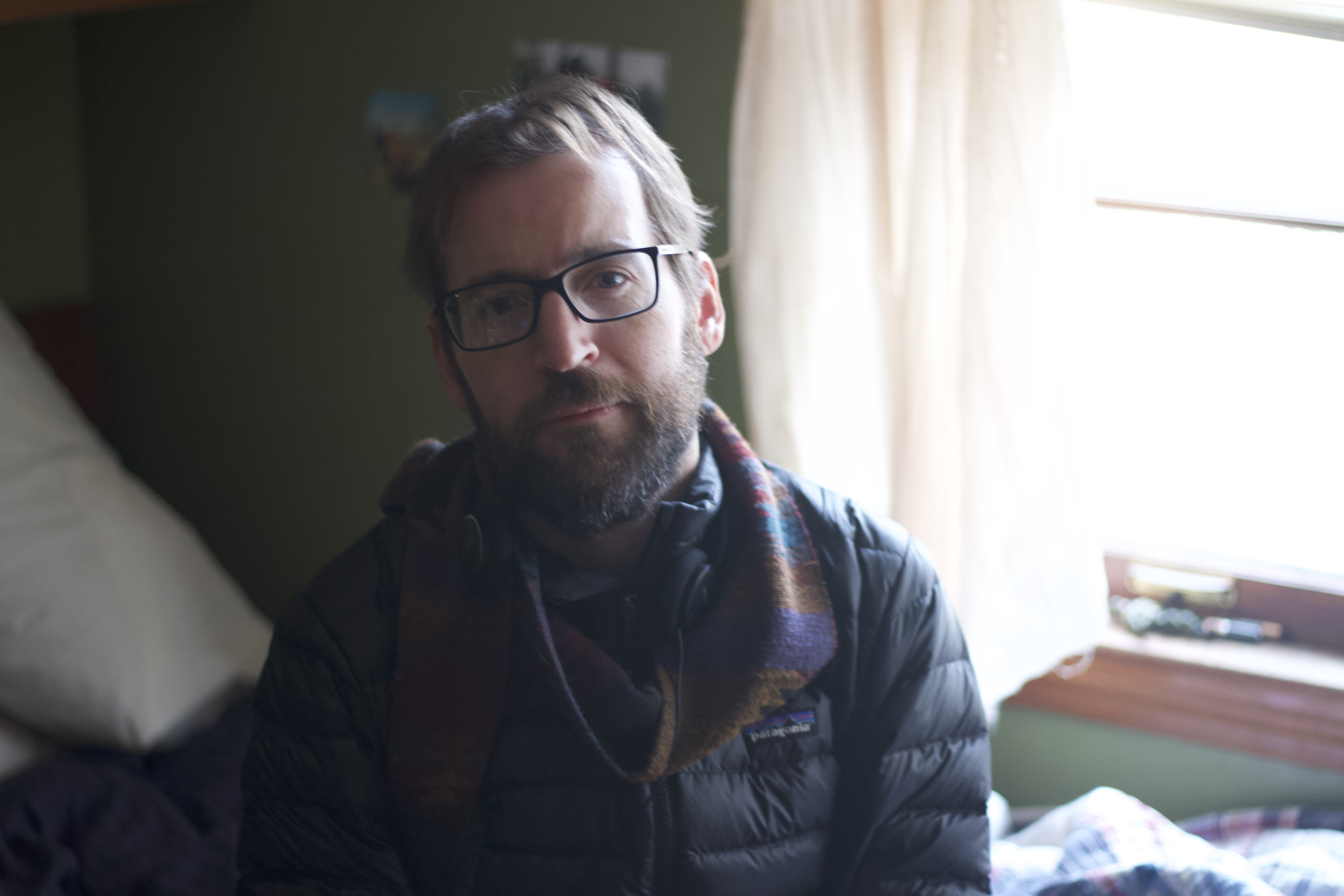
- Born: January 20, 1977 (age 49); Seattle, Washington, U.S.
- Occupations: Film director, screenwriter, film producer, author
- Known for: Don't Tell a Soul

Alex McAulay (born January 20, 1977) is an American film director and novelist. McAulay is best known for writing and directing the thriller films Don't Tell a Soul and A House on the Bayou.

== Career ==
McAulay directed, wrote and co-produced the thriller Don't Tell a Soul, starring Rainn Wilson, Jack Dylan Grazer, Fionn Whitehead and Mena Suvari which was a selection of the 2020 Tribeca Film Festival and premiered at the Deauville Film Festival in 2020. The movie was theatrically released by Saban Films and Lionsgate Films in January 2021.

McAulay also wrote, directed, and co-executive produced the Blumhouse horror film A House on the Bayou, starring Paul Schneider, Angela Sarafyan, Jacob Lofland and Lia McHugh, which was released on November 19, 2021, by Blumhouse Television, Epix/MGM+ and Paramount Home Entertainment.

In addition, he wrote and co-produced the film Flower starring Adam Scott and Zoey Deutch, which premiered at the Tribeca Film Festival in 2017. He has written four novels, published by Simon & Schuster.

== Filmography ==
=== Film ===
Year	Title	Director	Writer	Producer	Notes
2017	Flower	No	Yes	Yes	Co-producer
2020	Don't Tell a Soul	Yes	Yes	Yes	Directorial debut; co-producer
2021	A House on the Bayou	Yes	Yes	Yes	Co-executive producer

=== Acting roles ===
Year	Title	Roles	Notes
2012	D is for Dogfight	Young Hippie	Segment from The ABCs of Death
