= The Lodge (film) =

2019 film by Severin Fiala and Veronika Franz

- Theatrical release poster
- Directed by: Veronika Franz; Severin Fiala
- Written by: Sergio Casci; Veronika Franz; Severin Fiala
- Produced by: Simon Oakes; Aliza James; Aaron Ryder
- Starring: Riley Keough; Jaeden Martell; Lia McHugh; Alicia Silverstone; Richard Armitage
- Cinematography: Thimios Bakatakis
- Edited by: Michael Palm
- Music by: Danny Bensi; Saunder Jurriaans
- Production companies: FilmNation Entertainment; Hammer Film Productions
- Distributed by: Neon (United States); Sony Pictures Releasing International; Stage 6 Films (International)
- Release dates: January 25, 2019 (Sundance); February 7, 2020 (United States)
- Running time: 108 minutes
- Countries: United Kingdom; United States
- Language: English
- Box office: $3.2 million

The Lodge is a 2019 psychological horror film directed by Veronika Franz and Severin Fiala and written by Franz, Fiala, and Sergio Casci. The film stars Riley Keough, Jaeden Martell, Lia McHugh, Alicia Silverstone, and Richard Armitage. Its plot follows a soon-to-be stepmother who, alone with her fiancé's two children, becomes stranded at their rural lodge during Christmas. There, she and the children experience a number of unexplained events that seem to be connected to her past.

The project was announced in October 2017, with Riley Keough joining the cast of the film and Franz and Fiala directing from a screenplay they wrote alongside Sergio Casci. Much of the cast joined that February 2018 and principal photography began in March 2018 and wrapped that same month.

The Lodge had its world premiere at the Sundance Film Festival on January 25, 2019, and was initially scheduled to be released in the United States in November 2019 by Neon. However, Neon pushed its release back to the following year. It was given a limited theatrical release on February 7, 2020, which expanded on February 21, 2020. The film received generally positive reviews from critics, with many praising the performances, direction, and screenplay, as well as the horror elements.

== Plot ==
Laura Hall dies by suicide after her estranged husband Richard informs her he plans to marry Grace Marshall, a woman he met while researching a book about an extremist cult. Raised in the cult, Grace was the sole survivor of their mass suicide, led by her father. Laura's death devastates her and Richard's children, teenage Aiden and young Mia.

Six months later, Richard announces that they will spend Christmas with Grace at the family's remote Massachusetts lodge to get to know each other. Aiden and Mia uncover Grace's past, including video footage of the cult, showing the deceased followers draped in purple silk with duct tape across their mouths reading "sin." At the lodge, the children act hostile toward Grace and refuse efforts to bond with her, even after Richard departs back to the city for a work obligation. Grace's unease is compounded by the abundance of Catholic iconography (including a reproduction of the Virgin Annunciate by Antonello da Messina) in the cabin, which causes her to have nightmares about her father. After being rebuked for watching her shower, Aiden prepares Grace a cup of cocoa and the group watches a movie, during which the siblings decide to use a gas heater indoors and Grace wonders whether it is safe.

In the morning, Grace awakens to discover that her belongings – including her clothing, psychiatric medication, and pet dog – are missing, as well as all the food and Christmas decorations. The generator has gone out, leaving all of their cell phones dead. Grace suspects the children have pranked her but finds their belongings missing as well. She notices the clocks have advanced to January 9. Aiden tells Grace he dreamed the gas heater malfunctioned and they all suffocated and expresses fear that they may be in the afterlife.

Over the next several days, Grace succumbs to anxiety, medication withdrawal, hunger, and cold. She begins sleepwalking and is tormented by disturbing visions and dreams, including the recurrent voice of her father sermonizing. Grace attempts to walk to the nearest town, discovering a cross-shaped cabin where she sees her father beckoning to her. She eventually travels in a circle, taking her back to the lodge. Buried in the snow, Grace discovers a photo of Aiden and Mia in a memorial frame, and inside, finds the children praying over a newspaper article detailing the deaths of all three from carbon monoxide poisoning on December 22, 2019. Aiden insists they are in purgatory, and hangs himself in the attic as proof that they are dead, only to inexplicably survive.

Grace suffers a nervous breakdown, which intensifies when she finds her dog frozen to death outside. She enters a catatonic state on the porch. Worried she might die of exposure, the children finally admit that they have been gaslighting her the entire time, having drugged her, hidden their possessions in a crawlspace, faked the hanging, and played recordings of her father's sermons via a wireless speaker. With their own phones dead at last, the children unsuccessfully attempt to start the generator and bring Grace her medication, but find her convinced that they are in purgatory and must do penance to be accepted by God and ascend to heaven.

That night, the children witness Grace self-flagellating by burning herself on the hearth. They hide in the attic but Grace confronts them in the morning, insisting they must "sacrifice something for the Lord" and "free themselves from idols" before setting Mia's doll on fire. Richard returns to discover an inconsolable Grace holding his revolver. In an attempt to prove her belief that they are in purgatory, she first fires the gun at herself, however no bullet is fired. Convinced it is a sign of her incapacity of dying for being in the afterlife, she turns the gun and opens fire at Richard, shooting him in the head and killing him. Aiden and Mia attempt to flee in the car, but get stuck in the snow. Grace forces the children back into the lodge, where she seats them at the dinner table with their father's corpse and sings Nearer, My God, to Thee. Grace affixes duct tape reading "sin" over each of their mouths while a loaded gun rests on the table.

== Cast ==
- Riley Keough as Grace Marshall
  - Lola Reid as young Grace
- Jaeden Martell as Aiden Hall
- Lia McHugh as Mia Hall
- Richard Armitage as Richard Hall
- Alicia Silverstone as Laura Hall
- Danny Keough as Aaron Marshall

== Production ==
=== Development ===
The original screenplay for The Lodge was written by Scottish screenwriter Sergio Casci, which had been sold to Hammer Films. Hammer offered the screenplay to be directed by filmmaking duo Veronika Franz and Severin Fiala. The two agreed, though they rewrote a significant portion of the script, including the ending, which Franz felt "didn't work."

=== Casting ===
In October 2017, Riley Keough joined the cast of the film in the lead role of Grace. Prior to her being cast, Franz and Fiala were considering another unnamed actress for the part, but ultimately chose Keough. Franz stated: "The other actress had already started a journal about the character’s trauma. Then we met Riley, first on Skype and later personally. You know—it’s about meeting someone and connecting. That’s the first step: can you trust this person?"

In February 2018, Jaeden Martell, Richard Armitage and Lia McHugh joined the cast of the film, with production beginning that same day. To establish chemistry between Martell and McHugh, portraying siblings, directors Franz and Fiala took them on several excursions, including rock climbing and ice skating, to help establish a bond between the two before filming began. Keough was kept separated from the children pre-filming meetings to maintain a distance from them for their onscreen dynamic. Keough's father Danny plays Aaron Marshall, the cult leader and father of Keough's character, Grace.

=== Filming ===
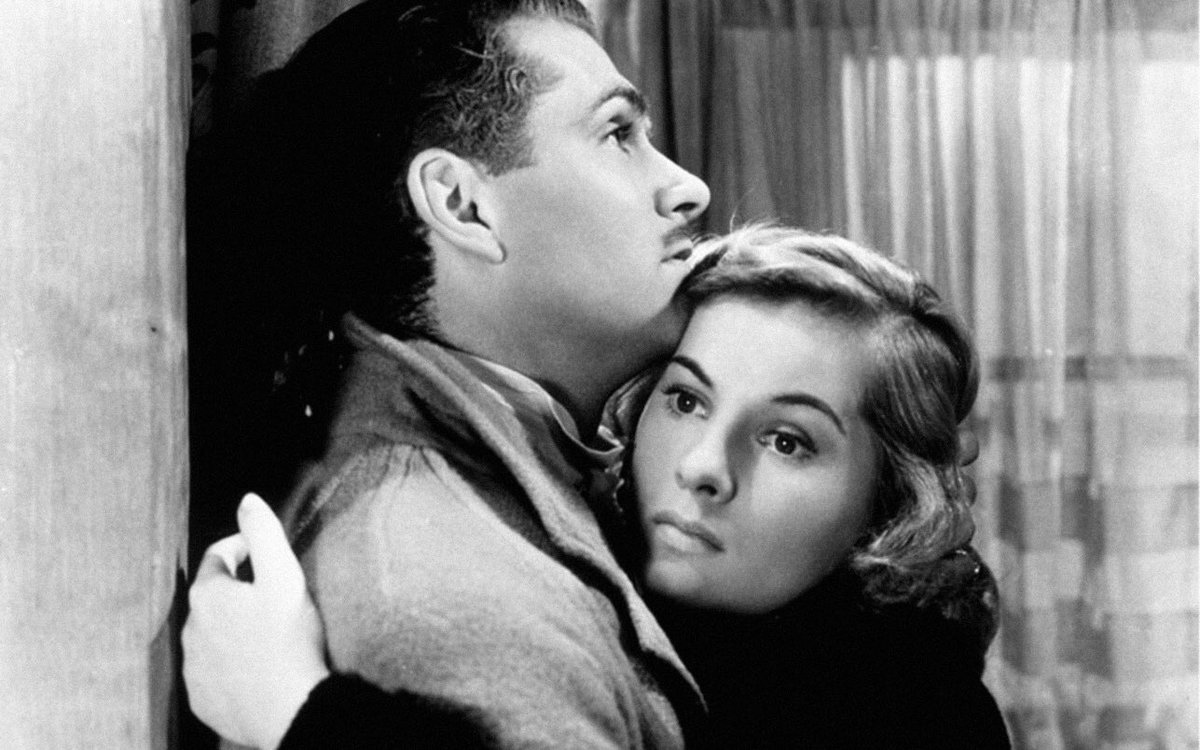
The film was thematically and visually influenced by Rebecca (1940), about a woman who suspects her home is haunted by her husband's deceased first wife

Filming of The Lodge took place outside of Montreal in the winter of 2018. The lodge featured in the film was located on a golf resort which was closed for the winter season. The film was shot in chronological order. Fiala elaborated on the decision to shoot chronologically: "[Riley] was worried that the journey her character takes was a very difficult one, because she has to hit every mark in a way that it still is plausible. And in order to help her walking down the path, we shot the whole film in sequence, not only to help her, but to help us, in order to really make this journey and watch every step we take. We felt it would help all the actors, actually, and could benefit their performances so much that we fought for that a lot."

The film was shot by cinematographer Thimios Bakatakis, a frequent collaborator of Yorgos Lanthimos. While shooting the interiors, Bakatakis, Franz, and Fiala deliberately chose to not frame shots at eye-level, instead opting for angles positioned from above or below the actors. Fiala commented that they intended to model the film after a haunted house movie, allowing the audience to initially suspect that the children's deceased mother, Laura, may be in fact haunting the home; in this regard, they were inspired specifically by Alfred Hitchcock's Rebecca (1940), in which a woman comes to believe her home is haunted by her husband's deceased first wife.

== Release ==
The film had its world premiere at the Sundance Film Festival on January 25, 2019. Shortly after, Neon acquired distribution rights to the film, and it made its east coast premiere in the After Hours section of the 28th Philadelphia Film Festival. The film was originally scheduled to be released in the United States on November 15, 2019, but it was delayed until February 7, 2020, when it was given a limited release in Los Angeles and New York City. The theatrical release expanded to 320 theaters in the United States on February 21, 2020.

=== Box office ===
During its opening week, The Lodge grossed $76,251 in six theaters in the United States. On February 14, the week following its initial release, the film expanded to 21 theaters, and had a weekend gross of $158,047. The film expanded to 322 theaters the following weekend. It concluded its U.S. theatrical run with a total gross of $1,666,564, and an international gross of $1,015,220, making for a worldwide gross of $2,681,784.

=== Critical response ===
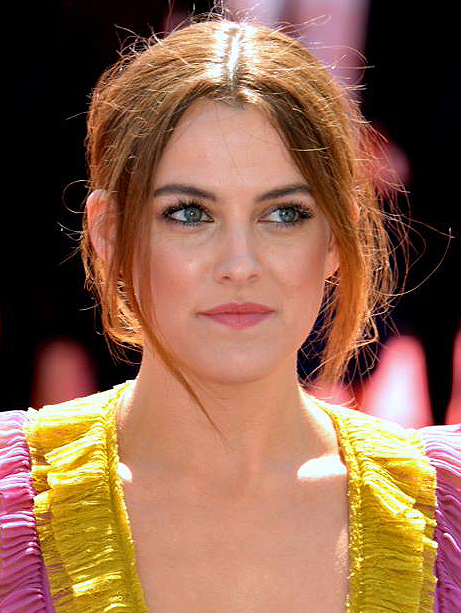
Keough's performance was highly praised by critics.

On review aggregator website Rotten Tomatoes, the film holds an approval rating of 75% based on 184 reviews, with an average of 7/10. The site's critics consensus reads: "Led by an impressive Riley Keough performance, The Lodge should prove a suitably unsettling destination for fans of darkly atmospheric horror." On Metacritic, the film has a weighted average score of 64 out of 100, based on 31 critics, indicating "generally favorable reviews".

Dennis Harvey of Variety wrote that "The Lodge may be best taken on the same terms as '60s/early '70s Italian giallos, with their somewhat random manipulations of plot and character logic in service of atmospheric shocks. Genre homage does not appear to be an intention here, but the film is certainly at its best in fostering a sense of stylish dread and orchestrating some harrowing individual sequences." Brian Tallerico of RogerEbert.com echoed a similar sentiment, deeming the film "a truly unsettling movie, the kind of horror film that rattles you on an almost subconscious level, making you more uncomfortable than going for cheap scares. Don't ask questions or dissect the believability of the plot. Just check in."

Jeannette Catsoulis of The New York Times noted the film's atmosphere as "so wintry in tone and setting that no movie-theater thermostat will banish its chill," but ultimately felt that "despite its visual flair and unrelentingly taut atmosphere, The Lodge is more successful in sustaining unease... than in building a convincing narrative." Benjamin Lee, writing for The Guardian, awarded the film four out of five stars, alternately praising it as "an accomplished beast: poking, prodding and teasing as it throws out potential twists before settling on the most devastating one of all. It's not an entirely unpredictable revelation but it's a smart, knowing and nasty way to go, taking the film to a place that's both staggeringly grim and hopelessly sad."

Several critics singled out Keough's lead performance with praise, including Michael Roffman of Consequence of Sound, who deemed it a "career-best... so much of Keough's performance contends with the bitter silence of reproach, isolation, and abandonment. Keough thrives in these moments, oozing with all kinds of anxious body language. It's in her glances. Those stares. The way she timidly saunters from room to room. She's a vessel of tragedy that's all the more tragic in her vicious attempts to keep on trying." The Los Angeles Times's Justin Chang felt the film paled in comparison to Franz and Fiala's previous film, Goodnight Mommy, but similarly praised Keough's performance as "the movie's strongest asset... [Keough] can seize and hold the screen with electrifying force... [and] is no less powerful in her quieter, more recessive moments."
