= A House on the Bayou =

2021 horror film

- Official release poster
- Directed by: Alex McAulay
- Written by: Alex McAulay
- Produced by: Paige Pemberton; Paul Uddo
- Starring: Paul Schneider; Angela Sarafyan; Jacob Lofland; Lia McHugh; Doug Van Liew
- Cinematography: Lyn Moncrief
- Edited by: Hunter M. Via
- Music by: Joseph Stephens
- Production companies: Blumhouse Television; Epix
- Distributed by: Paramount Home Entertainment
- Release date: November 19, 2021
- Running time: 88 minutes
- Country: United States
- Language: English

A House on the Bayou is a 2021 American horror film written and directed by Alex McAulay. It stars Paul Schneider, Angela Sarafyan, Jacob Lofland, Lia McHugh, Doug Van Liew, and Lauren Richards. Jason Blum serves as an executive producer through his Blumhouse Television banner.

The film was released on November 19, 2021, on digital by Paramount Home Entertainment and streaming on Epix.

== Plot ==
Jessica "Jess" Chambers confronts her husband John over an affair. John admits to seeing Vivienne Ballard, one of his students. John agrees to end the relationship with Vivienne, and to not tell anything about it to their daughter, Anna. He agrees to go on vacation with Jess and Anna to help mend their family.

The family travels to a house on the Louisiana bayou that Jessica manages through her job as a realtor. The family will vacation at the home while Jess prepares it for the market. Jessica and John argue over what to have for dinner, with Jess wanting veal. Jess then sends John and Anna to the grocery store. While there, Anna flirts with a boy named Isaac. The store owner writes a cryptic message on John's receipt that says: "The devil is watching you." John lies to Anna that the veal Jess wanted was not available, and they leave the store.

Isaac soon appears at the house and manipulates Jessica and John into inviting him and his Grandpappy, the store owner, in to cook a veal dinner, exposing John's lie. Over dinner, Isaac is hostile towards John and psychologically tortures the three family members with vague threats. Grandpappy explains that Isaac is a mysterious force, and he plays a record while Isaac is away. The disc plays a conversation that reveals John planned to abandon his family for Vivienne. John denies this and is goaded into going outside with Isaac, where it is revealed that John paid Isaac and Grandpappy to murder Jess. Isaac implies he is controlling things now, while inside, Grandpappy insists John is a pathetic husband and father.

Upon his return, Jess tells John she is divorcing him and that she sees through his gaslighting. Isaac tricks John into entering a room and locks him in. Vivienne shows up at the front door, lured there by Isaac using John's phone. Grandpappy forces Anna at gunpoint to burn Vivienne, who is locked in her car, for her transgressions; Jess burns her instead, then kills Grandpappy with a hammer after telling Anna to run. In the chaos, John is killed by a coyote inside the locked room. Isaac intimates the idea of taking Anna as his wife, claiming that he has been alive for centuries, has been to hell, and is unsure if he is an angel or a demon. When he reaches for Anna, Jess kills him.

Jessica and Anna go to Vierge County's Sheriff Torres to report events, but upon returning to the site, they find the house gone and the terrain vacant – except for Jess's discarded wedding ring on the (now) field of grass. On the ride back to the station, Torres pulls over to let the perfectly fine Isaac and Grandpappy drive by in their truck. Torres confirms that Isaac and Grandpappy are not human, they clean the town of evil-doers and sinners, and Jess should take her survival as a boon and never return to the town.

== Cast ==
- Angela Sarafyan as Jessica
- Paul Schneider as John
- Lia McHugh as Anna
- Jacob Lofland as Isaac
- Doug Van Liew as Grandpappy
- Lauren Richards as Vivienne
- Rhonda Johnson Dents as Sheriff Torres

== Production ==
In March 2021, it was announced that Alex McAulay would write and direct the television horror thriller film A House on the Bayou. The film was the first of eight films that Blumhouse Television would develop and produce exclusively for cable network Epix. That same month, it was announced that Lia McHugh had joined the cast of the film. Paul Schneider, Angela Sarafyan, Jacob Lofland, Doug Van Liew and Lauren Richards were cast in April.

Principal photography took place from March 22 to April 19, 2021, in New Orleans.

== Release ==
The film was released on November 19, 2021, on digital by Paramount Home Entertainment and on Epix.
