= Flower (film) =

2017 film by Max Winkler

- Theatrical release poster
- Directed by: Max Winkler
- Written by: Alex McAulay; Max Winkler; Matt Spicer
- Produced by: Brandon James; Eric B. Fleischman; Sean Tabibian; Matt Spicer
- Starring: Zoey Deutch; Kathryn Hahn; Tim Heidecker; Adam Scott; Joey Morgan; Dylan Gelula
- Cinematography: Carolina Costa
- Edited by: Jeff Seibenick; Sarah Beth Shapiro
- Music by: Joseph Stephens
- Production companies: Rough House Pictures; Diablo Entertainment
- Distributed by: The Orchard
- Release dates: April 20, 2017 (Tribeca); March 16, 2018 (United States)
- Running time: 93 minutes
- Country: United States
- Language: English
- Budget: $500,000
- Box office: $380,553

Flower is a 2017 American independent romantic comedy drama film directed by Max Winkler, from a screenplay by Winkler, Alex McAulay, and Matt Spicer. Starring Zoey Deutch, Kathryn Hahn, Tim Heidecker, Adam Scott, Joey Morgan, Dylan Gelula, Maya Eshet, and Eric Edelstein; the film follows Erica Vandross (Deutch), a sexually curious teenager who forms an unlikely bond with her mentally unstable stepbrother Luke Sherman (Morgan).

Flower premiered at the Tribeca Film Festival on April 20, 2017, where it was nominated for Best U.S. Narrative Feature. The film was theatrically released in the United States on March 16, 2018, to mixed reviews from critics.

== Plot ==
17-year-old Erica Vandross gives a police officer oral sex in his patrol car, after which 2 of her friends sneak up and record them. They extort $400 from the cop as Erica is underage.

Erica and her friends are vigilantes who frequently entrap pedophiles. Erica is saving up to bail her father out of jail, where he is awaiting trial for trying to rob a casino.

Erica's mother Laurie is not bothered by Erica's promiscuity, but is disappointed Erica does not like her new boyfriend Bob. His son Luke, an emotionally disturbed 18-year-old, gets out of rehab and comes to live with them. Erica offers Luke oral sex, which he refuses, but they soon develop an unlikely friendship.

At a bowling alley, Luke has a panic attack when he sees his middle school teacher, Will Jordan, whom he accused of sexual assault. Will was never charged due to inconsistencies in Luke's story. Later that night, Erica interrupts Luke's suicide attempt.

Erica and her posse decide to make Will their next target, and Luke reluctantly agrees to participate. At a grocery store, Erica flirts with Will, and later she approaches him at the bowling alley. Although he is aware that Erica is underage, they make out in his car in the parking lot. Before things can go any further, she abruptly stops it. Her friends accuse her of sabotaging the plan because she likes Will.

The gang forms a new plan. Erica gives a drug dealer oral sex in exchange for roofies, so they can lace a beer with it. Erica visits Will's house with a 6pack, apologises for the previous night, and they go inside his house to hang out. She asks about a model of the Eiffel Tower on his coffee table, and this prompts him to tell the story of being fired and divorced after he was falsely accused of molestation.

Erica slaps the beer out of his hand, but as he feels the strong effect of the roofies, he grabs her arm and she screams. Luke runs in and knocks Will onto the glass coffee table, smashing it. The four of them pick Will up and prop him up on the couch while two of the girls strip down to their underwear and take pictures with him to use as blackmail.

Luke worries that Will's breathing is too slow, but they leave, shaken by the encounter. On the way out, Erica sees that the other girls have spray-painted the word "pedophile" on the garage door.

The next morning, police show up at the Vandross house and accuse Erica and Luke of vandalism. They mention that they have not been able to contact Will yet, so the two go back to Will's house to make sure he is okay. They find Will sitting on the couch exactly where they left him so try to shake him awake, but he is dead. He falls over, revealing blood and the Eiffel Tower model impaled in his back. Luke convinces Erica they have to run away to Mexico.

While on the run, Erica looks for reassurance from Luke that Will deserved what happened to him. He reveals that he was never molested by Will. Luke walked in on him molesting his classmate, but she was afraid to tell anyone. So, he lied to keep it from happening to anyone else.

Luke surprises Erica by driving her to her father's prison and giving her bail money. However, she is heartbroken to find out that he was bailed out a few days ago and did not contact her.

Erica decides she does not want to live as a fugitive; she wants them to go home and turn themselves in. Luke agrees, but on their way back, a police car tries to pull them over. Erica tells Luke that they cannot get caught before turning themselves in, so they try to lose the police on a dirt road.

During the chase, Luke confesses his love for Erica. They give up on the chase, stop the car, and have sex on the ground, where the police find them. One month later, Erica visits Luke in prison shortly before her house arrest begins. Despite their circumstances, they are happy and in love.

== Cast ==
- Zoey Deutch as Erica Vandross
- Kathryn Hahn as Laurie Vandross
- Adam Scott as Will Jordan
- Tim Heidecker as Bob Sherman
- Joey Morgan as Luke Sherman
- Dylan Gelula as Kala
- Maya Eshet as Claudine
- Eric Edelstein as Dale Dotter
- Romy Byrne as Alli Whitman
- Jake Johnson as Raymond Vandross

== Production ==
On June 23, 2016, it was reported that Zoey Deutch, Kathryn Hahn, Adam Scott, and Tim Heidecker would star in Flower, directed by Max Winkler from a script by Alex McAulay that was on the 2012 Black List of best unproduced screenplays. Filming was set to begin that summer.

== Filming ==
Filming was completed in 17 days in the San Fernando Valley.

== Release ==
Flower premiered at the 2017 Tribeca Film Festival on April 20, 2017. Shortly after, The Orchard acquired distribution rights to the film. The first trailer teaser was released on December 1, 2017. The film was released on March 16, 2018.

== Reception ==
The film holds an approval rating of 48% on review aggregator website Rotten Tomatoes, based on 73 reviews with an average rating of 5.8/10. The website's critics consensus states, "Flower proves Zoey Deutch can bring even the most preposterously written characters vividly to life—and that she isn't quite enough to carry a fundamentally flawed film." On Metacritic, the film has a weighted average score of 45 out of 100, based on 20 critics, indicating "mixed or average" reviews.
