= Don't Tell a Soul (film) =

2020 film by Alex McAulay

- Official release poster
- Directed by: Alex McAulay
- Written by: Alex McAulay
- Produced by: Chris Mangano; Merry-Kay Poe
- Starring: Jack Dylan Grazer; Fionn Whitehead; Mena Suvari; Rainn Wilson
- Cinematography: Guillermo Garza
- Edited by: Ben Baudhuin
- Music by: Joseph Stephens
- Production companies: Mangano Movies & Media; Unbridled Film
- Distributed by: Saban Films; Lionsgate Films
- Release dates: September 8, 2020 (Deauville); January 15, 2021 (United States)
- Running time: 83 minutes
- Country: United States
- Language: English

Don't Tell a Soul is a 2020 American thriller film written and directed by Alex McAulay, in his directorial debut. It stars Rainn Wilson as a security guard who gets trapped in a hole chasing two teens (Jack Dylan Grazer and Fionn Whitehead) who stole $12,000, and must barter for his life; Mena Suvari also stars.

The film had its world premiere at the Deauville Film Festival on September 8, 2020, and was released in the United States on January 15, 2021.

== Plot ==
To support their dying mother Carol, 17-year-old Matt forces his 14-year-old brother Joey to rob a remote home being fumigated. Security guard Dave Hamby chases the two boys through a forest, but falls into an abandoned well. Matt insists on leaving Hamby in the hole so he cannot turn the brothers in to the police. Feeling guilty about leaving the man trapped, Joey regularly visits Hamby to bring him water, food, a sleeping bag, and a walkie-talkie. When he discovers what his brother is doing, Matt urinates on Hamby's head to reassert authority. Incensed when Joey continues bonding with the man, Matt drops an open pesticide canister into the hole to kill Hamby. Joey confronts Matt when he learns his brother used the stolen money meant for their mother to host a motel party. Matt responds by telling partygoers that Joey steals from retired people. Joey retaliates by revealing that Matt killed a man. Matt threatens and beats Joey.

Joey runs back home where Carol's TV news program reveals the man in the well is actually Randy Michael Sadler, a fugitive wanted for murdering his wife and children. Joey returns to the hole and discovers Randy survived the pesticide by wearing the gas mask Joey dropped during the chase. Randy admits he stole a security guard's uniform and was trying to retrieve the stolen money for himself. Joey bargains to rescue Randy from the well in exchange for help punishing Matt. Joey brings Randy home after using a rope to get him out of the hole. Carol recognizes Randy from the news bulletin. Carol is shocked to discover Joey is helping Randy go on the run.

At the same time, Matt reports Joey as the thief to police officers Smith and Crane, who are investigating the initial vandalism; Matt inadvertently implicates himself in the robbery (and knowing Randy was imprisoned in a hole but failed to notify police). Matt accompanies the two officers back to the house where a standoff ensues with Randy. Randy shoots both officers, but Joey stops him from killing them. Randy and Joey then take Matt to the hole in the forest. After forcing Matt into the well, Randy compels Joey to shout angry invectives at his brother. Randy then pushes Joey into the hole. Matt beats Joey unconscious. Randy starts limping away when Carol confronts him at gunpoint. Carol reveals she killed her abusive husband. Following a conversation about her troubled family, Carol shoots Randy dead. Fearing he killed his brother, Matt finally manages to rouse Joey and tearfully apologizes for all he has done. Matt and Joey embrace as Carol comes to their rescue.

== Cast ==
- Jack Dylan Grazer as Joey
- Fionn Whitehead as Matt
- Rainn Wilson as Dave Hamby / Randy Michael Sadler
- Mena Suvari as Carol

== Production ==
In January 2019, it was announced that Jack Dylan Grazer, Fionn Whitehead, Rainn Wilson and Mena Suvari had joined the cast of the film, with Alex McAulay directing from a screenplay he wrote in his directorial debut.

== Reception ==
On review aggregator website Rotten Tomatoes, the film holds an approval rating of 73% based on 15 reviews, with an average rating of 6.1/10. On Metacritic, the film has a weighted average score of 45 out of 100, based on four critics, indicating "mixed or average" reviews.

Richard Whittaker of The Austin Chronicle wrote, "As for Wilson, he fits effortlessly into this equation as the proxy father upon whom Matt can inflict his one sense of revenge against his late dad, and in whom Joey finds something like parental approval."

== Release ==
The film had its world premiere at the Deauville Film Festival on September 8, 2020. It was previously scheduled to premiere at the Tribeca Film Festival on April 23, 2020. However, the festival was cancelled due to the COVID-19 pandemic. Shortly after, Saban Capital Group acquired North American distribution rights to the film for releasing through its dedicated division, Saban Films. Universal Pictures distributed it internationally. The film was released in North America on January 15, 2021, in limited release in 115 theaters and on VOD by Saban; by the end of its third weekend in release, it had grossed $167,000 theatrically. It was released on DVD and Blu-ray by Lionsgate Films on March 16, 2021.
