= Lia McHugh =

American actress (born 2005)

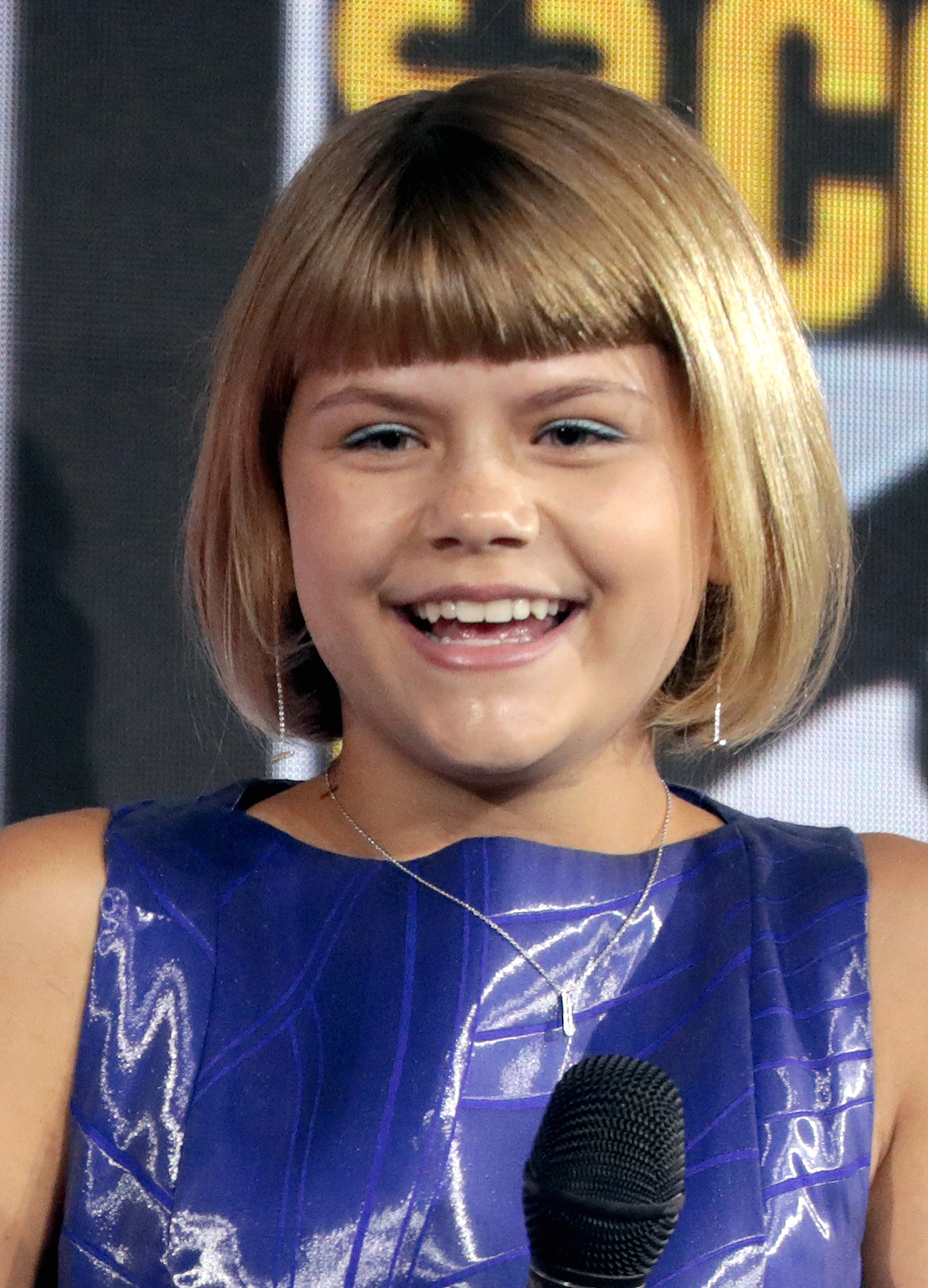
- McHugh at the 2019 San Diego Comic-Con
- Born: Lia Ryan McHugh; November 18, 2005 (age 20); Pittsburgh, Pennsylvania, U.S.
- Occupation: Actress
- Years active: 2016–present

Lia Ryan McHugh (born November 18, 2005) is an American actress. She has roles in Totem (2017), The Lodge (2019), and Into the Dark (2019). She portrayed Sprite in the Marvel Cinematic Universe (MCU) film Eternals (2021).

== Early life ==
McHugh was born to Michael McHugh and Lisa McHugh in November 2005 In Pittsburgh, Pennsylvania, into an acting family. She has three older siblings—Flynn, Logan and Shea—and a younger sibling, Gavin, who has cerebral palsy. Gavin is also an actor and plays Christopher Diaz in the drama series 9-1-1.

== Career ==
McHugh has spent the majority of her career appearing in horror projects; A Haunting, Totem, Along Came the Devil, The Lodge, Into the Dark, and A House on the Bayou. She portrayed Sprite in the Marvel Cinematic Universe film Eternals, which was released in November 2021.

== Filmography ==
=== Film ===
Year	Title	Role	Notes
2017	Hot Summer Nights	Summer Bird Sister	
2017	Totem	Abby	
2018	Along Came the Devil	Young Ashley	
2019	The Lodge	Mia Hall	
2020	Songbird	Emma Griffins	
2021	Eternals	Sprite	
2021	A House on the Bayou	Anna	
2023	Baby Blue	Laura Mills	

=== Television ===
Year	Title	Role	Notes
2016	A Haunting	Jacey	Documentary series; episode: "Tunnel of Death"
2018	American Woman	Jessica Nolan	Main role; 11 episodes
2019	Into the Dark	Maggie Singer	Episode: "They Come Knocking"
