= Jack Dylan Grazer =

American actor (born 2003)

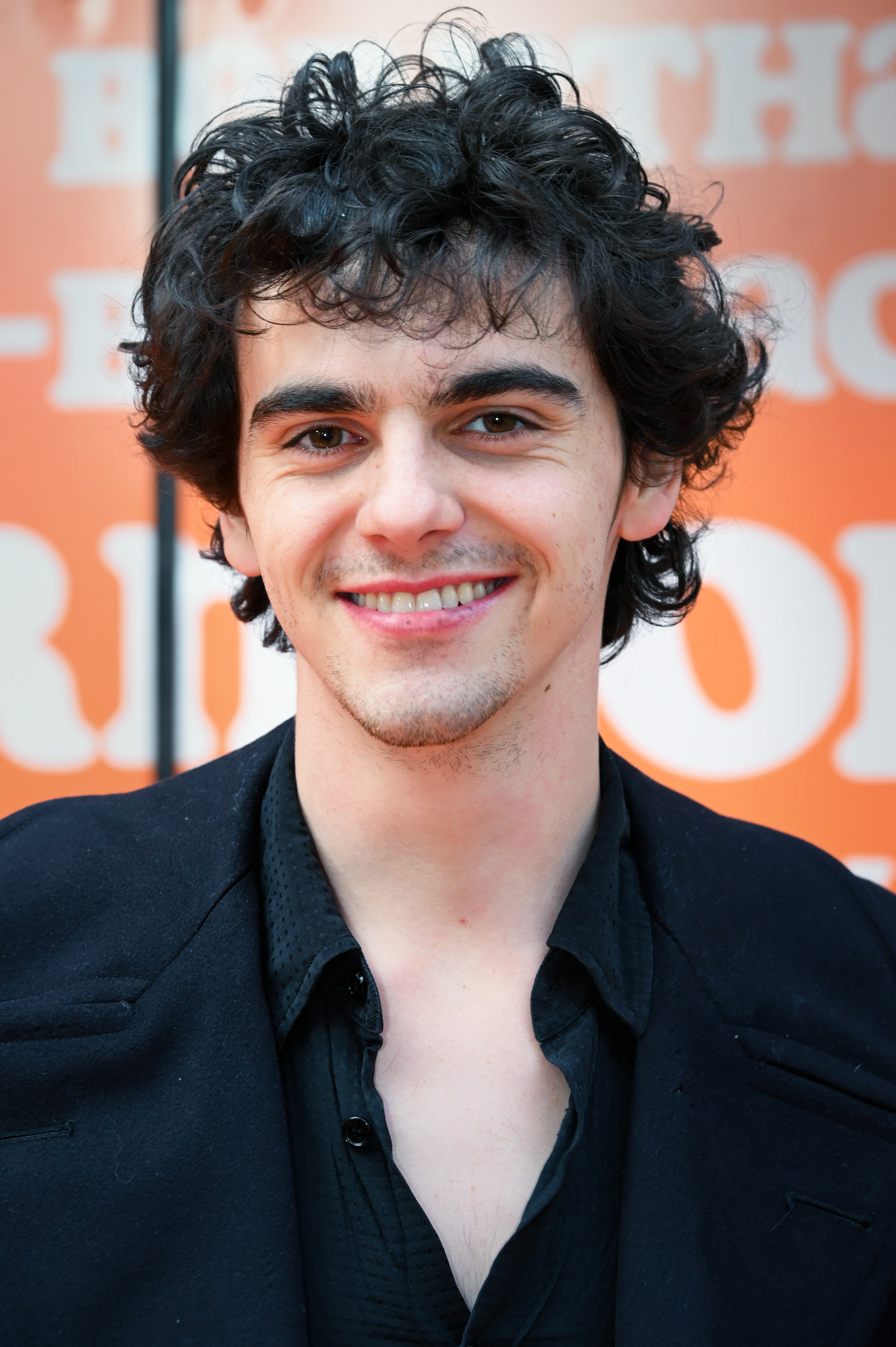
- Grazer in 2026
- Born: September 3, 2003 (age 23); Los Angeles, California, U.S.
- Occupation: Actor
- Years active: 2014–present
- Relatives: Brian Grazer (uncle)

Jack Dylan Grazer (born September 3, 2003) is an American actor. He (Note: Grazer uses he/they pronouns. This article uses masculine pronouns for consistency.) is known for his roles in the horror film It (2017) and its 2019 sequel, the DC Extended Universe superhero film Shazam! (2019) and its 2023 sequel, and for his voice role in the Pixar animated film Luca (2021).

== Life and career ==
Grazer was born in Los Angeles, California, the son of Angela Lafever and Gavin Grazer, an actor. His paternal uncle is producer Brian Grazer. Grazer sponsors a scholarship at the Adderley School for Performing Arts in Pacific Palisades, where he is an alumnus, for two students annually.

The Hollywood Reporter named him one of the top 30 stars under age 18 in 2018.

He began his acting career by playing guest roles in film and on television. Grazer had his breakthrough role in an adaptation of Stephen King's novel It, playing the role of Eddie Kaspbrak in the supernatural horror films It (2017) and It Chapter Two (2019). He also starred on the CBS series Me, Myself, & I. Grazer portrayed Freddy Freeman in the 2019 DC Extended Universe film Shazam! and later reprised his role in the 2023 sequel Shazam! Fury of the Gods. Grazer had lead roles in Luca Guadagnino's coming-of-age drama television series We Are Who We Are (2020) and in the thriller film Don't Tell a Soul (2020). He voiced Alberto Scorfano in the Pixar film Luca (2021), and voiced Barney in the animated film Ron's Gone Wrong (2021). He also appeared in the 2022 DC Comics animated film Batman and Superman: Battle of the Super Sons as the son of Superman, Jonathan Kent.

In July 2021, Grazer came out as bisexual during an Instagram livestream and declared "he/they" as his pronouns.

== Filmography ==
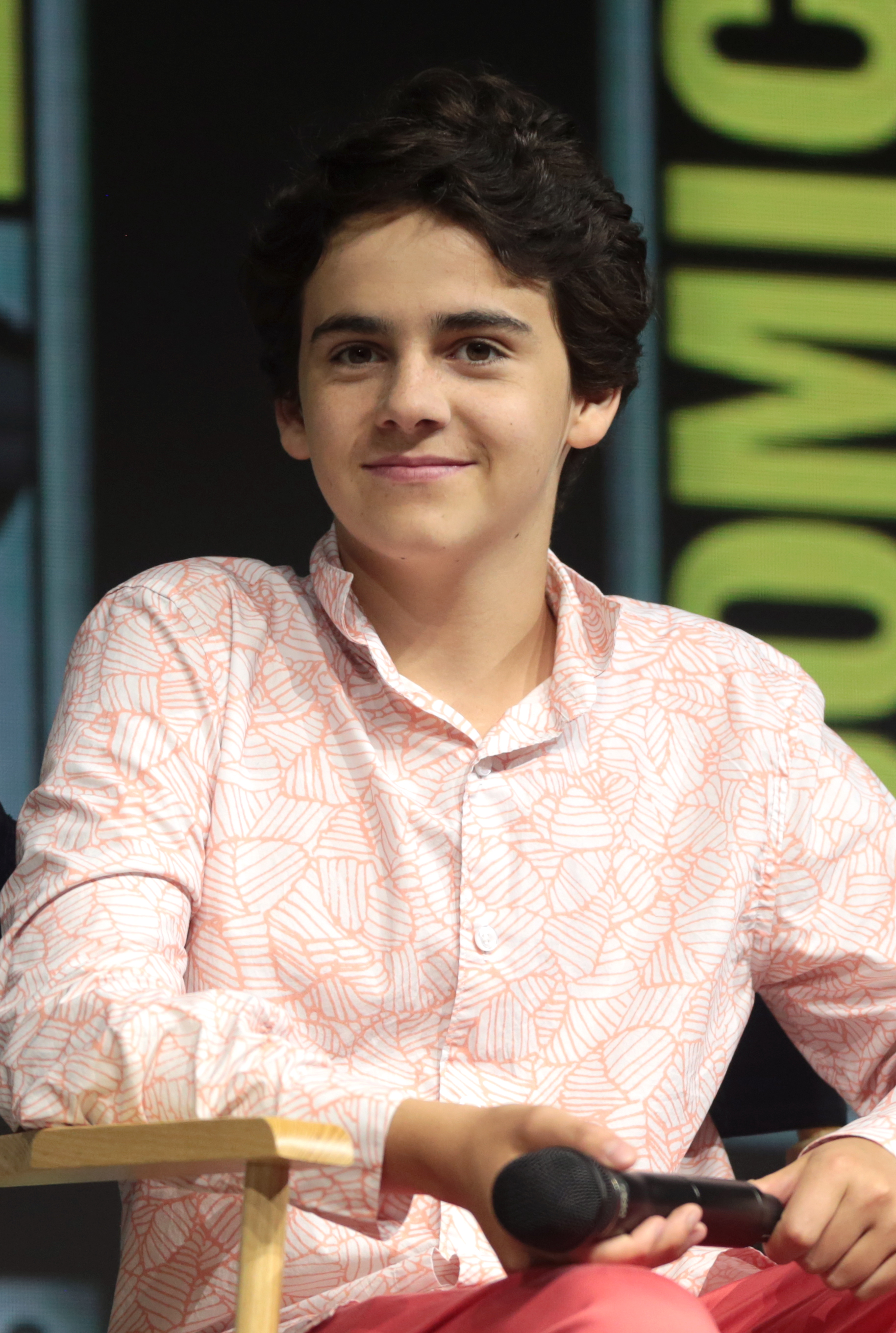
Grazer at the 2018 San Diego Comic-Con

=== Film ===
Key
| † | Denotes films that have not yet been released |

| Year | Title | Role | Notes | Ref. |
|---|---|---|---|---|
| 2015 | Tales of Halloween | Young Joey Stranger | Segment: The Weak and the Wicked; anthology film | |
| 2017 | It | Eddie Kaspbrak | | |
| 2017 | Scales: Mermaids Are Real | Adam Wilts | | |
| 2018 | Beautiful Boy | 12-year-old Nic Sheff | | |
| 2019 | It Chapter Two | Young Eddie Kaspbrak | | |
| 2019 | Shazam! | Freddy Freeman | | |
| 2020 | Don't Tell a Soul | Joey Chambliss | | |
| 2021 | Luca | Alberto Scorfano | Voice role | |
| 2021 | Ciao Alberto | Alberto Scorfano | Voice role; animated short film | |
| 2021 | Ron's Gone Wrong | Barney | Voice role | |
| 2022 | Batman and Superman: Battle of the Super Sons | Jonathan Kent / Superboy | Direct-to-video film; voice role | |
| 2022 | Dreamin' Wild | Young Joe Emerson | | |
| 2023 | Shazam! Fury of the Gods | Freddy Freeman | | |
| 2023 | Downtown Owl | Eli | | |
| 2024 | Friendship | Steven Waterman | | |
| 2026 | Ponderosa † | Zeke | Post-production | |
| 2027 | 4 Kids Walk Into a Bank † | Berger | Post-production | |

=== Television ===
| Year | Title | Role | Notes | Ref. |
|---|---|---|---|---|
| 2014 | The Greatest Event in Television History | Son | Episode: "Bosom Buddies" | |
| 2015 | Comedy Bang! Bang! | Kayden Aukerman | Episode: "Jesse Tyler Ferguson Wears a Brown Checked Shirt and Stripey Socks" | |
| 2017–2018 | Me, Myself & I | Young Alex Riley | Main role | |
| 2018 | Speechless | Rev | Episode: "E-I-- EIGHTEEN" | |
| 2019 | Robot Chicken | Freddy Freeman | Voice role; Shazam! promotion | |
| 2020 | We Are Who We Are | Fraser Wilson | Main role | |
| 2024 | The Spiderwick Chronicles | Thimbletack | Main role; voice | |
| 2026 | Dexter: Resurrection | John Thomas Jr. / JawSplitter | Episode: "Young Blood" | |

== Accolades ==
| Year | Association | Category | Nominated work | Result | Ref. |
|---|---|---|---|---|---|
| 2017 | Fright Meter Awards | Best Supporting Actor | It | Nominated | |
| 2018 | MTV Movie & TV Awards | Best On-Screen Team | It | Won | |
| 2019 | Hollywood Critics Association | Next Generation of Hollywood | – | Won | |
| 2022 | Annie Awards | Best Voice Acting – Feature | Luca | Nominated | |
