= Jérémie Fajner =

French producer

- Born: 11 December 1974 (age 51)
- Occupations: Film producer Media executive

Jérémie Fajner is a French producer and media executive best known as the co-founder and managing director of Superprod Group, a Paris-based animation, film, and television production company. He co-founded the company in 2010 alongside Clément Calvet.

Fajner has received several César Awards nominations, including for Dead Man Talking and Song of the Sea.

== Career ==
Fajner served as deputy managing director for production financing and business development at Alphanim.

After Alphanim was acquired by Gaumont in 2008 and renamed Gaumont Animation, Fajner left the company and founded Superprod alongside Clément Calvet in 2010. Fajner first met Clément Calvet at Alphanim in the late 1990s, where the two worked for more than a decade on approximately 20 animated productions, including XDucks, Mona the Vampire, and Franklin.

Fajner serves as producer and managing director of Superprod Group. Projects associated with the studio include Lassie, Netflix's Spirit Rangers, Batwheels, Geronimo Stilton, Heroic Football, Paddington, and Go! Go! Cory Carson. He also produced animated feature films including Song of the Sea, Cafard, and White Fang.

Under the leadership of Fajner and Clément Calvet, Superprod Group expanded internationally with operations in Paris, Angoulême, Milan, Los Angeles, and London, growing from two employees at its founding to approximately 400 employees by 2021. During this period, the company also expanded beyond animation into live-action film and television production, music rights management, and international distribution.

=== Production approach ===
Fajner has described animation as a collaborative art form that depends heavily on in-person interaction and studio culture. Following the COVID-19 pandemic, he supported bringing employees back into shared creative spaces while maintaining some workplace flexibility.

Regarding artificial intelligence in animation production, Fajner commented that AI tools could improve efficiency in repetitive production tasks, while stating that "nothing replaces a team of artists, a director and an actor."

Fajner has also emphasized the importance of maintaining in-house production pipelines and integrated studio workflows as part of Superprod's production structure.

== Filmography ==
=== Film ===
Year	Title	Role	Notes
2006	Franklin and the Turtle Lake Treasure	Producer	
2009	Eleanor's Secret	Producer	
2012	Dead Man Talking	Co-producer	
2014	Song of the Sea	Producer	
2015	Cafard	Co-producer	
2015	Jailbirds	Producer	
2018	White Fang	Producer	
2020	Les blagues de Toto	Executive producer	
2022	The Lulus	Producer	
2023	Mr. Blake at Your Service!	Producer	
2023	Les blagues de Toto 2 - Classe verte	Producer	

=== Television ===
Year(s)	Title	Role	Notes
2004	Ralf the Record Rat	Producer	
2005–2008	Robotboy	Co-executive producer	
2006–2011	Galactik Football	Associate producer	78 episodes
2007–2014	Kika & Bob	Executive producer	52 episodes
2008–2009	Matt's Monsters	Associate producer	52 episodes
2008–2012	Hairy Scary	Co-producer, producer	
2009–2011	Mouss & Boubidi	Associate producer	52 episodes
2009–2013	Gawayn	Associate producer	
2009–2017	Geronimo Stilton	Producer, executive producer	79 episodes
2010	The Green Squad	Associate producer	52 episodes
2010	The Mysteries of Alfred Hedgehog	Associate producer	52 episodes
2010	The Small Giant	Associate producer	
2010	Toto Trouble	Associate producer	
2014–2019	Lassie	Executive producer	52 episodes
2017	Helen's Little School	Executive producer	52 episodes
2017–2020	Pat the Dog	Executive producer	101 episodes
2020–2021	Go! Go! Cory Carson	Executive producer	16 episodes
2022	Anna & Friends	Producer	
2023	Home Sweet Rome	Executive producer	13 episodes
2023–2025	Panda	Producer	12 episodes
TBD	Vet Academy	Producer, Executive Producer	
TBD	Underdog	Producer	

== Awards and recognition ==
In 2014, Fajner received a César Awards nomination for Best Foreign Film as French co-producer of Dead Man Talking, directed by Patrick Ridremont.

In 2015, Fajner received a César Awards nomination for Best Animated Film as co-producer of Song of the Sea, alongside Tomm Moore and Clément Calvet.

In 2018, Fajner received a European Film Awards Nomination for White Fang.

In 2019, Fajner was invited to join the Academy of Motion Picture Arts and Sciences as a member of the Short Films and Feature Animation branch.

In 2024, Fajner received a Canadian Screen Awards nomination for Best Children's or Youth Fiction Program or Series for Home Sweet Rome, shared with Clément Calvet, Doug Schwalbe and more.
