= Fionn Whitehead =

English actor (born 1997)

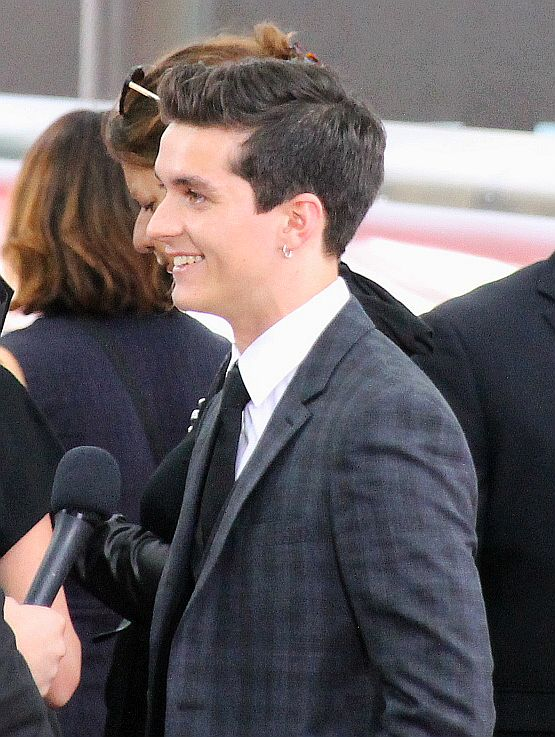
- Whitehead at the premiere of Dunkirk in 2017
- Born: 18 July 1997 (age 29); Richmond, London, England
- Occupation: Actor
- Years active: 2016–present
- Father: Tim Whitehead

Fionn Whitehead (/fɪn/ FINN; born 18 July 1997) is an English actor. He portrayed the lead role in the 2017 film Dunkirk and the 2018 film Black Mirror: Bandersnatch. His first acting credit was in the 2016 ITV miniseries Him.

== Early life and career ==
Whitehead was born on 18 July 1997 in the Richmond area of London to jazz musicians Tim and Linda Whitehead. He was named after Irish folk legend Fionn mac Cumhaill. Whitehead has two older sisters, Maisie, a performance artist and Hattie, a singer, and one older brother, Sonny. Whitehead was raised "in an artistic household". As a child, he aspired to become either a guitarist or a breakdancer.

He began acting at the Orange Tree Theatre aged thirteen. He went to Richmond College and entered the National Youth Theatre's summer course. By 2015, he was an aspiring actor working at a coffee shop in Waterloo, London.

== Career ==
In 2016, Whitehead starred in the British miniseries Him. In 2017 he acted in a stage performance of Glenn Waldron's Natives.

He was cast as the protagonist of Christopher Nolan's film Dunkirk, which was released in 2017. Nolan compared Whitehead to actor Tom Courtenay in his youth. Weeks after Whitehead finished with Dunkirk, he began work with Richard Eyre's film The Children Act, opposite Emma Thompson and Stanley Tucci; it premiered at the Toronto International Film Festival in September 2017. He also starred in one of eight monologues in the television series Queers that aired in 2017.

In 2018, Whitehead starred in the Black Mirror television series’ interactive stand-alone film Bandersnatch, as lead character Stefan Butler. In 2019, Whitehead appeared in Sebastian Schipper's drama Roads, and the Martin Scorsese produced Port Authority. He later appeared in The Duke and Don’t Tell a Soul (both 2020). He co-stars as Branwell Bronte in the Emily Bronte biopic Emily (2022), and in a television adaptation of Great Expectations (2023), playing the lead role of Pip.

In 2025, he starred in Alex Burunova's debut feature Satisfaction alongside Emma Laird and Zar Amir Ebrahimi, which premiered at the 2025 South by Southwest Film & TV Festival.

He played Jay Parini in the film Borges and Me (2026), based on Parini's memoir Borges and Me: An Encounter. The film also stars Freya Mavor and Alan Cumming

== Filmography ==
Movies & Television
Year	Title	Medium	Role	Notes
2016	Him	Miniseries	Him	
2017	Dunkirk	Film	Thomas "Tommy" Jensen	
2017	Queers	TV series	Andrew	"A Grand Day Out" monologue (one of eight monologues)
2017	The Children Act	Film	Adam Henry	
2018	Black Mirror: Bandersnatch	Film	Stefan Butler	Stand-alone interactive film of Black Mirror
2019	Roads	Film	Gyllen	
2019	Port Authority	Film	Paul	
2020	Inside No. 9	TV series	Gabriel	Episode: "Misdirection"
2020	The Duke	Film	Jackie Bunton	
2020	Don't Tell a Soul	Film	Matt	
2021	Voyagers	Film	Zachary "Zach"	
2022	Emily	Film	Branwell Brontë	
2023	Great Expectations	TV series	Pip	Main role
2025	Satisfaction	Film	Philip	Main role
2026	Borges and Me	Film	Jay Parini	Main role

== Accolades ==
Whitehead's accolades
Year	Film	Award	Ceremony	Result	Ref.
2017	Dunkirk	Empire Award for Best Male Newcomer	23rd Empire Awards	Nominated	
2017	Dunkirk	London Film Critics' Circle Award for Young British/Irish Performer of the Year	38th London Film Critics' Circle Awards	Nominated	
2017	The Children Act	London Film Critics' Circle Award for Young British/Irish Performer of the Year	39th London Film Critics' Circle Awards	Nominated	
2022	Emily	British Independent Film Awards' Award for Best Supporting Performance	25th British Independent Film Awards	Nominated	
2022	Emily	British Independent Film Awards' Award for Best Ensemble Performance	25th British Independent Film Awards	Nominated	
