= Gods Behaving Badly (film) =

2013 unreleased film directed by Marc Turtletaub

- Film poster
- Directed by: Marc Turtletaub
- Written by: Marie Phillips; Josh Goldfaden
- Based on: Gods Behaving Badly by Marie Phillips
- Produced by: Peter Saraf; Marc Turtletaub; Caroline Jaczbo
- Starring: Alicia Silverstone; Ebon Moss-Bachrach; Christopher Walken; Sharon Stone; John Turturro; Edie Falco; Oliver Platt; Rosie Perez
- Cinematography: Tak Fujimoto
- Edited by: Alan Heim; Joe Landauer
- Music by: Christopher Young
- Production company: Big Beach Films
- Release date: November 13, 2013 (Rome Film Festival)
- Country: United States
- Language: English

Gods Behaving Badly is a 2013 American comedy-drama film based on the 2007 satire novel of the same name by Marie Phillips. The film is the feature-length directorial debut of Marc Turtletaub, who is better known as a film producer.

== Plot ==
The film is about a young mortal couple (Alicia Silverstone and Ebon Moss-Bachrach) who encounter a group of Greek gods living in New York City.

== Cast ==
- Alicia Silverstone as Kate
- Ebon Moss-Bachrach as Neil
- Christopher Walken as Zeus
- Sharon Stone as Aphrodite
- John Turturro as Hades
- Edie Falco as Artemis
- Oliver Platt as Apollo
- Rosie Perez as Persephone
- Phylicia Rashad as Demeter
- Nelsan Ellis as Dionysus
- Gideon Glick as Eros
- Laryssa Lauret as Trudy
- Henry Zebrowski as Hermes
- Will Swenson as Ares
- Glenn Fleshler as Landauer
- Aasif Mandvi as Maxwell
- Kathleen Turner as Styx

== Production ==
The film was shot during mid-2011. The setting of the story was changed from contemporary London to modern day New York City.

== Release ==
The film was shot in 2011 and premiered at the 2013 Rome Film Festival, where it received negative reviews, and was never officially released.
