= Meristem (disambiguation) =

Meristem is a type of tissue found in plants.

Meristem may also refer to:

- Meristem (school), a California school for autistic young adults.
- Meristem Securities, a Nigerian Capital Market.
