= Croc-Blanc =

Croc-Blanc may refer to

- White Fang (1991 film) (French title)
- White Fang (2018 film) (French title)
