= Marc Turtletaub =

American film director (born 1946)

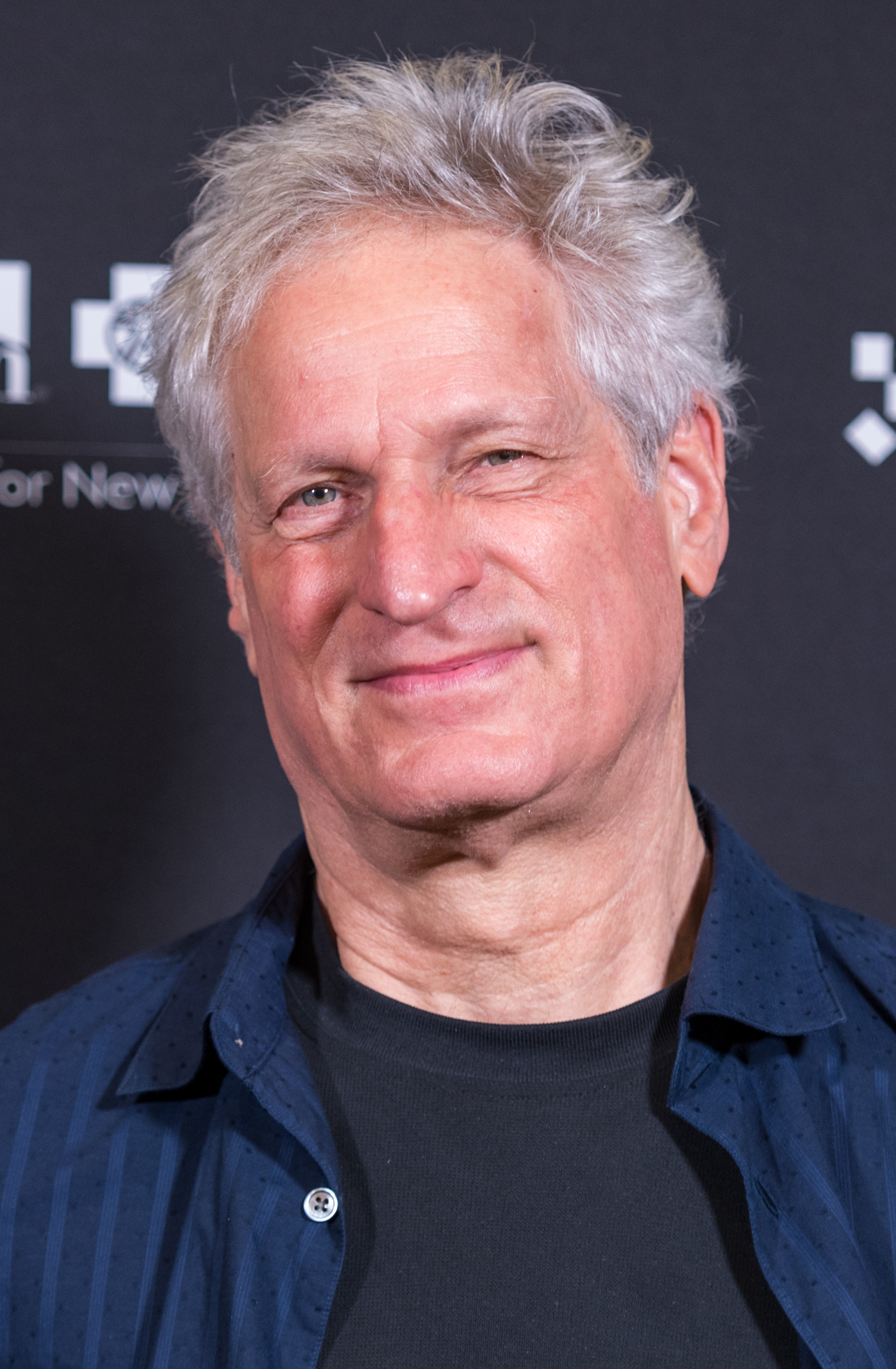
- Turtletaub in 2018
- Born: January 30, 1946 (age 80); Lakewood, New Jersey, U.S.
- Education: University of Pennsylvania (BA); New York University (JD)
- Occupations: Film producer and director
- Spouse: Maureen Curran-Turtletaub
- Relatives: Alan Turtletaub (father); Beatrice Ann Turtletaub (mother)

Marc Jay Turtletaub (born January 30, 1946) is an American film producer and former president and CEO of the Money Store.

== Early life and education ==
Born in Lakewood, New Jersey, Turtletaub grew up in Perth Amboy, New Jersey and the adjoining township of Woodbridge. He attended Rutgers Preparatory School, graduating in the class of 1963. The captain and center on the basketball team, he made All-State in his senior year and was inducted into the Rutgers Prep Athletic Hall of Fame in 1993. At the time of his induction, he was called a "class individual" by the former basketball coach.

Turtletaub was a political science major at the Wharton School of the University of Pennsylvania, graduating in 1967. He was a reporter and then managing editor of the campus newspaper, The Daily Pennsylvanian. He received a "Men's Senior Honor Award" for "outstanding service to the University community" and was selected to be a member of the prestigious Sphinx Senior Society.

In 1970, Turtletaub graduated from New York University School of Law. He was subsequently admitted to the California Bar, but becamen inactive in 2013. He was a journalist for six years after finishing school.

== The Money Store ==
The Money Store Logo

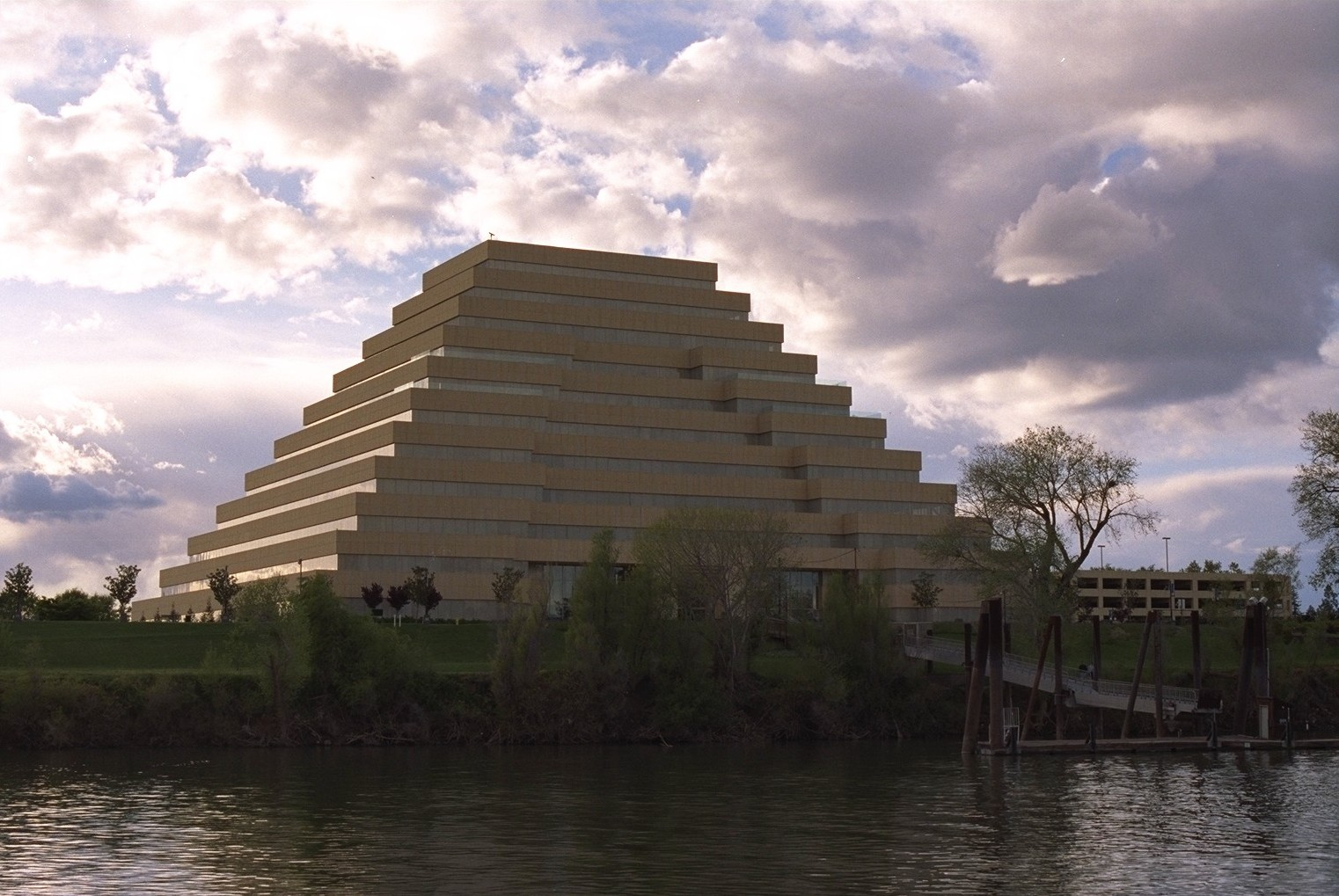
Ziggurat Building, West Sacramento, former home of The Money Store

Turtletaub spent 20 years working for The Money Store, a business that his father, Alan Turtletaub, founded in 1967. The Money Store was an early leader in the subprime lending industry, lending home equity-secured second mortgages and other loans to people with blemished credit. Turtletaub succeeded his father as CEO and president in 1989, and took the company public in 1991, and then sold it in June 1998 to First Union Bank for $2.1 billion.

During his tenure, the advertising-driven lending company saw a period of growth At the time of the sale, revenue was $831 million/year, loan originations were more than $1 billion a quarter, there were 172 branches and 5000 employees; it was the nation's 5th-largest subprime lender, and the leading home equity and Small Business Administration lender. Turtletaub built the 400,000-square-foot (37,000 m^{2}) Ziggurat shaped headquarter in West Sacramento. He subscribed to the ancient principles of feng shui, a Chinese geometric practice; with architect Ed Kado, he incorporated these features into the design of this "unique landmark." The need for a "deep pocket" led to the merger with First Union; bond rating agencies had downgraded The Money Store to junk bond status. Within a day of the merger it had a solid rating. "We will now benefit from the rating of the parent company. We are going to be in the driver's seat," Turtletaub said. First Union had trouble integrating acquisitions, and The Money Store did not prosper after the merger.

At the time of the severe liquidity crisis of August 1998, the subprime industry imploded. The main source of funds to replenish capital and to refinance new loans, securitization, dried up. Also, the parent company revamped many of the advertising programs that had made the company so previously successful; the Money Store was soon described as barely existing in the form that it was bought in. Turtletaub resigned as president and CEO in May, 1999. By October, 1999, the deal was called a "disaster" for First Union. First Union, preparing for a Wachovia merger, split The Money Store into four divisions, and transferred First Union's bad home equity loans into The Money Store's home equity division. The student loan division, Educaid, and the SBA loan division were retained by First Union.

Turtletaub was a "generous donator" to federally elected officials; a friend of President Bill Clinton (FOB), he was permitted to sleep in the Lincoln bedroom, and had a private "coffee visit" with President Clinton and Senator Chris Dodd, then chairman of the Senate Banking Committee.

The Money Store's use of political donations and lobbyists was described by the Small Business Administration as the "classic example of the interaction of money, politics and regulation." Competitors felt that The Money Store was treated more favorably because of its political clout, with accusations that federal rulings in its favor were "politically fixed."

The Money Store was closed in July, 2000, at a loss of $1.7 billion to First Union Bank Corp.

== Producer ==
=== Approach to filmmaking ===
Turtletaub used his $700 million profit from selling The Money Store to go into the film business. He describes himself as a child of the counter-culture and only wants to make films he is passionate about to better lives of those who view them. Therefore, he allegedly reviews screenplays that illuminate human condition and emotional connection.

Additionally, Turtletaub has preferred to work with first-time script writers and directors.

=== Deep River Productions ===
Before entering the film world, Turtletaub spent almost a year meeting people in the film industry. He commented that he used the instincts he developed as a reporter to ask questions and learn the craft of filmmaking. In 2000, he teamed with producer David Friendly, forming Deep River Productions. The original plan was to use Turtletaub's resources to buy material to develop, then taking the properties to the studios for production. By 2005, he had scaled back and moved away from this strategy after an initial spending spree. Several movies were produced by Deep River, most notably Little Miss Sunshine, a 2006 Academy Award nominee for best picture. Turtletaub originally bought Michael Arndt's repeatedly rejected script for $250,000, repurchased it two years later for $400,000 and then paid the $8 million costs of production. The film was a box-office success and critically acclaimed. Friendly and Turtletaub split after a six-year run.

=== Big Beach Films ===
In 2004, Turtletaub joined Peter Saraf to form Big Beach Films, with Turtletaub realizing the "need to specialize." Turtletaub has described himself and Saraf as creative producers, involved in every stage of the filmmaking, from the original idea through the editing process. They have produced over 20 movies, and, are best known for lower budget comedy-drama films, such as Little Miss Sunshine and Safety Not Guaranteed. Made in 2012 with a first-time director and writer and costing less than a million dollars, the film was picked up by Netflix.

Big Beach also produced the 2019 Sundance breakout The Farewell starring Awkwafina. The Farewell was critically and financially successful, The Farewell has been called a groundbreaking work for bringing a broad based Asian-American narrative to Hollywood, allowing members of the community "to see their own experiences and their own stories on the screen." Another 2019 release was Marielle Heller's biographical film A Beautiful Day in the Neighborhood, with Tom Hanks portraying Mr. Rogers. The scripted drama premiered at the 2019 Toronto International Film Festival; it had made the 2013 Black List of the best unproduced screenplays. The story about a man dedicated to radical kindness has been viewed as a politically trenchant movie of the Trump era. These two 2019 releases have been described as humanistic and life affirming. The Farewell won the 2019 Spirit Award for best independent feature; and, the two films were nominated for a total of three Golden Globe awards and one Academy Award. Turtletaub commented: "We have specific taste. People want to see stories that touch their heart. That's hard to define." Documentary productions include Seed: The Untold Story, earning him an Emmy nomination for Outstanding Nature Documentary; Sheila Nevins and Davy Rothbart's 17 Blocks, the winner of multiple film festival awards; and Becoming Led Zeppelin.

==== Big Beach TV and Beachside ====
In 2014 Turtletaub started a TV division, Big Beach TV, which works closely with his L.A. affiliate, Beachside, focusing on micro-budget features and digital content. Through Big Beach TV, Turtletaub produced the Starz drama Vida and Elizabeth Olsen's "engrossing" Sorry for Your Loss. Vida has been described as groundbreaking; it has the first all-Latinx writers room on TV, with several queer writers and all but one writer identifying as female. It has created "a safe space for stories regarding Latinx and freedom of sexual identity." A critical and ratings success, it has allowed the Mexican-American and queer "communities to feel recognized in a way that the vast majority of television does not." In 2021 Vida received an Imagen nomination for Best Primetime Program – Comedy. Turtletaub was executive producer of the filmed version of the Obie and New York Drama Critics' Circle award-winning Broadway play What the Constitution Means to Me, starring Heidi Schreck. It began streaming on Amazon Prime October 16, 2020. The production has been described as a "flashing catastrophe alert." In 2021 Turtletaub, along with Alex Turtletaub and Saraf, was an executive producer of the IDA Award nominee HBO documentary series Nuclear Family; Big Beach was one of the production companies.

In February, 2022, Big Beach moved its headquarters to Los Angeles and laid off an unknown number of staff. Saraf had "quietly" left in 2021. Big Beach announced in 2024 that they had fully relocated to Los Angeles, and that their films Out of My Mind (film) and Winner (2024 film) would premiere at the 2024 Sundance Film Festival.

=== Theatrical career ===
His theatrical producing debut was in 2009, the Off-Broadway Sleepwalk with Me. Broadway productions include the revivals of Of Mice and Men, Sylvia, Burn This (2019) and Les Liaisons Dangereuses.

== Director ==
In 2011 he directed Gods Behaving Badly, a film adaption of the 2007 satirical novel of the same name. The film was never released, and played only once, at the 2013 Rome Film Festival, where it received negative reviews.

He directed the 2018 film Puzzle, an English-language remake of the 2010 Argentinian film. Described as a lovely, gentle movie, it received generally excellent reviews with a Rotten Tomatoes rating of 83%. It has been credited as having "broken a glass ceiling" when it had an Asian Indian, Irfan Khan, as a romantic lead in an American film. Puzzle was chosen to open the 2018 Edinburgh Film Festival. This was Khan's last role in an American movie, as the acclaimed actor died shortly later. Turtletaub was motivated to direct Puzzle for a personal reason. Puzzle was dedicated to his mother, Beatrice Ann Turtletaub.

"It’s a story about a woman who’s a mother and a wife living in suburban Connecticut, doting on her husband and her sons. And I knew that woman – it was my mother. I grew up in suburban New Jersey, and she doted on my dad and me. When I read [the screenplay], I felt like it was a story I could tell."

He directed (and produced) Jules, a movie starring Ben Kingsley and Jane Curtin. Filming started September 10, 2021, in Boonton, New Jersey. It is about an unusual visitor to a small western Pennsylvania town. The film had its world premier at the 2023 Sonoma International Film Festival in March, 2023. It was the opening night film and won the Stolman Audience Award for Best Feature. At the 18th Rome Film Festival, the film was awarded the Ugo Tognazzi Prize for Best Comedy. Bleecker Street released the film in theaters August 11, 2023.

Turtletaub directed Borges and Me, an adaptation of Borges and Me: An Encounter, Jay Parini’s novelized memoir about his 1970 road trip through the Scottish Highlands with Jorge Luis Borges. Filming completed in the fall of 2024 and the film was first shown at the Edinburgh International Film Festival on 15th August, 2026.

Marie Phillips, the author of the novel Gods Behaving Badly, described Turtletaub on-set as genial, good-natured and friendly.

His style is radical and unique. He does no rehearsals, and, allows the "actors free to bring in what they can bring in" and surprise him. He only does a few takes, at most, which he feels allows "something fresh to come in," not necessarily his original vision.

== Personal life ==
Turtletaub has two sons and is married to Maureen Curran-Turtletaub, a movement educator for over 30 years and founder and director of Movement as a Path for Transformation. Described as "prominent Sacramento philanthropists," they established Meristem in 2014 on 13 "bucolic" acres near the American River. Inspired by and using John Ruskin's "craft and land" philosophy of education, Meristem educates young adults with ASD and other developmental differences, transitioning them so they will better succeed as adults in an evolving post-industrial society.

He has remained politically active since leaving The Money Store. He has supported Democratic candidates at many levels of office, from city to federal. In addition to Sacramento, since 2000 Turtletaub has had residences in Los Angeles, the West Village, Orcas Island, and Makena, Hawaii.

== Filmography ==
He was a producer in all films unless otherwise noted.

Year	Film	Credit
2004	Laws of Attraction	
2005	Duane Hopwood	
2005	The Honeymooners	
2005	Everything Is Illuminated	
2006	Little Miss Sunshine	
2006	Sherrybaby	
2007	Chop Shop	
2008	Sunshine Cleaning	
2008	Is Anybody There?	
2009	Away We Go	
2010	Jack Goes Boating	
2011	Our Idiot Brother	
2012	Safety Not Guaranteed	
2013	Gods Behaving Badly	Director
2015	Louder Than Bombs	
2015	Me Him Her	
2015	3 Generations	
2016	Loving	
2016	Seed: The Untold Story	Executive producer
2018	White Fang	
2018	Puzzle	
2019	The Farewell	
2019	A Beautiful Day in the Neighborhood	
2020	What the Constitution Means to Me	Executive producer
2021	Land	Executive producer

As director

Year	Film
2013	Gods Behaving Badly
2018	Puzzle
2023	Jules
2026	Borges and Me

As writer

Year	Film
2013	Gods Behaving Badly

As an actor

Year	Film	Role
2004	Laws of Attraction	Judge Withers
2006	Little Miss Sunshine	Doctor #1

Thanks

Year	Film	Role
2012	Sleepwalk with Me	The filmmakers wish to thank
2016	Morris from America	Special thanks
2018	Maine	Special thanks

=== Television ===
Year	Title	Credit	Notes
2018	Vida	Executive producer	
2018−19	Sorry for Your Loss	Executive producer	
2021	Nuclear Family	Executive producer	Documentary

== Awards ==
- Independent Spirit Award for Best Film, 2006, Little Miss Sunshine
- Producers Guild of America Award for Best Theatrical Motion Picture, 2006, Little Miss Sunshine
- Producers Guild of America Award, 2016 - The Stanley Kramer Award, Loving
- Independent Spirit Award for Best Film, 2019, The Farewell
- Peabody Award, 2024, Out of My Mind
