= Pat the Dog =

Kid's cartoon

- Genre: Comedy; Slapstick
- Created by: Patrick Ermosilla
- Based on: Space Dog by Sylvain Seynhaeve
- Directed by: Charles Vaucelle (season 1); Daniel Klein (season 2); Guillaume Rio (episodes 94, 104 and 112)
- Voices of: Kaycie Chase; Tiffany Hofstetter; Gaël Zaks
- Theme music composer: Kungs; Victor Soulisse; Harry Allouche (arranger, orchestrator, conductor and co-producer)
- Composer: Marc Tomasi
- Countries of origin: France; Italy; Belgium (season 1)
- Original languages: English; French; Italian
- No. of seasons: 2
- No. of episodes: 51 (145 segments)

Production
- Producers: Davide Tromba Valentina Canclini Clément Calvet Jérémie Fajner
- Editors: Cécile Rougnaux; Patrick Delcourt; Jean-Philippe Pelleti; Alice Boitard; Amélie Degouys; Violette Fond; Samuel Denou
- Running time: 7 minutes
- Production companies: Superprod Animation; Superprod Studio (season 2); Animoka Studios; Toon Factory (season 1); Grid Animation (season 1); Rai Fiction (season 1)

Original release
- Network: Télétoon+ and Canal+ Family (France); Rai Gulp (Italy); La Trois, OUFtivi and Ketnet (Belgium; season 1)
- Release: April 3, 2017 – November 27, 2022

Pat the Dog is an animated children's television series created by Patrick Ermosilla and produced by Superprod Animation alongside its Angoulême-based studio Superprod Studio (for season 2) and Animoka Studios, in co-production with Toon Factory (season 1), Grid Animation (season 1) and Rai Fiction (season 1), in partnership with the CNC and Pôle Image Magelis, with the participation of Télétoon+ (season 1), Canal+ Family (season 1), Rai Com, La Trois (season 1), OUFtivi (season 1), Ketnet (season 1), The Walt Disney Company France (season 2), France Télévisions (season 2) and Rai Ragazzi (season 2), and in association with Cofinova 12 (season 1) and SG Image 2018 (season 2). It is based on the mobile app game Space Dog by Sylvain Seynhaeve. The series is about Pat the dog's adventures as he tries to save his owner Lola from trouble. It debuted on La Trois in Belgium on April 3, 2017.

The series was very successful internationally and a second season was made in 2020, with 63 episodes of 7 minutes and 4 specials of 22 minutes produced, as well as derivative episodes on Hoodie.

== Plot ==
Pat the Dog is about the titular character who tries to save the day when his owner, Lola, is in trouble.

== Characters ==
=== Main ===
- Pat is the protagonist of the series. He is an intelligent, brave, kindhearted, mechanically inclined dog hero who will go to any lengths to protect the ones for whom he cares.
- Lola is a girl who is Pat and Hoodie's owner. She has a special bond with Pat, but is often oblivious to the crazy adventures he goes on (which are more often than not revolved around her).
- Victor is a troublemaking boy who is Lola's next-door neighbor. He is also sometimes an antagonist of the series, but sometimes he and Lola get along. He can also be considered Lola's rival. Unlike Lola, Victor's parents do not show their faces.

=== Recurring ===
- Hoodie is a cat who is also Lola's pet. He is very cute, fluffy and cheerful and wears a hood. He is also very harmless, because he never tries to hurt anyone. He can also get easily distracted by the birds who try to lure him into traps. He is also the one that Pat tries to save.
- Tank is Victor's pit bull. He is very loyal to his owner and can be considered to be Pat's rival.
- The Triplet Birds are antagonists of the series and three rivals of Pat. It is unknown why they have disagreements with and became enemies of Pat the Dog.
- Poulette is a featherless chicken who is always "bullied" by Pat, because she is always seen getting into accidents or hit by Pat.
- Lucy is a girl who is Lola's best friend.
- Hugo is a boy who is also friend of Lola and Lucy.
- Mum is Lola's mother.
- Dad is Lola's father.
- Honorine is an elderly woman who is Lola's babysitter. She has a hamster named Pompom.
- Marcel is a thief who always steals things.
- Squizel is Marcel's mouse.

== Production ==
Pat the Dog is co-produced by French companies Superprod Studio, Toon Factory (season 1), Télétoon+, and Canal+ Family, Italian companies Animoka Studios and Rai Fiction (season 1), and Belgian companies OUFtivi (season 1), Ketnet (season 1) and Grid Animation (season 1), in association with Cofinova 12 (season 1) and SG Image 2018 (season 2), and distributed by Superights Kids & Family Entertainment.

== Broadcast ==
Pat the Dog debuted on La Trois in Belgium on April 3, 2017, and November 3, 2019. The series aired on Disney Channel on the Get Animated! block in the United States and Boomerang in Australia on June 3, and Boomerang in the United Kingdom and Ireland on July 3 and February 3.

== Episodes ==
Seasons	Segments	Episodes	First released	Last released
1	78	26	April 3, 2017	December 2, 2018
2	63	21	March 5, 2020	May 5, 2021
Specials	–	4	December 25, 2020	November 27, 2022

=== Season 1 (2017–18) ===
No.	Title	Directed by	Written by	Storyboard by	Belgian air date	U.S. air date	U.S. viewers (millions)
1	"Cave-Pat"	Charles Vaucelle	Xavier Vairé	Matthieu Pitschon	April 3, 2017	June 4, 2017	1.09
2	"Yard Sale"	Charles Vaucelle	Julie Meliès	Yann Provost	April 4, 2017	June 10, 2017	0.89
3	"Caterpillar Catastrophe"	Charles Vaucelle	Xavier Vairé	Charles Vaucelle	April 5, 2017	June 3, 2017	0.92
4	"Strawberries and Screams"	Charles Vaucelle	Yves Coulon	Lionel Brousse	April 6, 2017	June 4, 2017	1.09
5	"Baboon Beasties vs. Bouncy Castles"	Charles Vaucelle	Anastasia Heinzl	Mickaël Mérigot	April 7, 2017	June 3, 2017	0.92
6	"Panic at the Vet"	Charles Vaucelle	Fred Monfort	Mickaël Mérigot	April 10, 2017	June 10, 2017	0.89
7	"Hoodies on the Loose"	Charles Vaucelle	Anastasia Heinzl	Matthieu Pitschon	April 11, 2017	June 4, 2017	1.09
8	"Strict Surveillance"	Charles Vaucelle	Fred Monfort	Marc-Antoine Buhagiar	April 12, 2017	June 3, 2017	0.92
9	"Pat on Guard Duty"	Charles Vaucelle	Anastasia Heinzl	Matthieu Pitschon	April 13, 2017	June 11, 2017	0.95
10	"Playing Sick"	Charles Vaucelle	Anastasia Heinzl	Mickaël Mérigot	April 14, 2017	June 10, 2017	0.89
11	"Anchors Away!"	Charles Vaucelle	Simon Lecocq	Lionel Brousse	April 6, 2017	June 11, 2017	0.95
12	"Jurassik Pat"	Charles Vaucelle	Benjamin Le Bars	Mickaël Mérigot	May 25, 2017	June 11, 2017	0.95
13	"Easter Eggs"	Charles Vaucelle	Mélodie Begassat-Piquet	Emmanuel Perez	April 17, 2017	August 5, 2017	N/A
14	"Invisible Enemy"	Charles Vaucelle	Yves Coulon	Yann Provost	July 11, 2017	June 17, 2017	0.91
15	"Pet Parlour Panic"	Charles Vaucelle	Christopher Panzner	Marc-Antoine Buhagiar	July 12, 2017	June 17, 2017	0.91
16	"Picnic Palaver"	Charles Vaucelle	Julie Meliès	Stéphane Annette	July 12, 2017	September 23, 2017	0.76
17	"Lola in Space"	Charles Vaucelle	Benjamin Le Bars	Yves Provost	July 13, 2017	July 23, 2017 (Note: This episode was released on the WATCH Disney Channel app on July 8, 2017 and February 8, 2020.) (Note: This episode aired on Boomerang in the United Kingdom and Ireland on July 7, 2017.)	0.85
18	"Over-Inflated"	Charles Vaucelle	Fred Monfort	Marc-Antoine Buhagiar	July 13, 2017	August 5, 2017 (Note: This episode aired on Boomerang in the United Kingdom and Ireland on July 7, 2017.)	0.86
19	"Frenemies"	Charles Vaucelle	Benjamin Le Bars	Lionel Brousse	July 14, 2017	June 24, 2017	1.05
20	"Camping Carnage"	Charles Vaucelle	Julie Meliès	Stéphane Annette	July 14, 2017	August 5, 2017	N/A
21	"Pat vs. Titan"	Charles Vaucelle	Yves Coulon	Jean-Louis Champault	July 17, 2017	June 24, 2017	1.05
22	"House of Spooks"	Charles Vaucelle	Fred Louf	Mickaël Mérigot	July 17, 2017	June 18, 2017	0.94
23	"3D Printer"	Charles Vaucelle	Julie Meliès	Jean-Louis Champault	July 18, 2017	June 17, 2017	0.91
24	"Mayhem at the Museum"	Charles Vaucelle	Christopher Panzner	Jun Violet	July 18, 2017	June 24, 2017	1.05
25	"Like a Ton of Bricks"	Charles Vaucelle	Olivier Vannelle	Mickaël Mérigot	July 19, 2017	June 18, 2017	0.94
26	"Trick or Treat Terror"	Charles Vaucelle	Benjamin Le Bars; Marine Lachenaud	Jun Violet	October 29, 2017	October 7, 2017	1.06
27	"The Real Pat"	Charles Vaucelle	Simon Lecocq	Mickaël Mérigot	July 19, 2017	July 29, 2017	0.90
28	"The Ransom"	Charles Vaucelle	Benjamin Le Bars; Marine Lachenaud	Thomas Allart	July 20, 2017	July 23, 2017	0.85
29	"Commander Sandy"	Charles Vaucelle	Olivier Vannelle	Mickaël Mérigot	July 20, 2017	June 18, 2017	0.94
30	"Rescue Tank"	Charles Vaucelle	Simon Lecocq	Emmanuel Perez	July 21, 2017	June 25, 2017	0.83
31	"Pat's Bird Cold-Case"	Charles Vaucelle	Vincent De Mul	Jean-Louis Champault	July 21, 2017	October 7, 2017	1.06
32	"Special Delivery"	Charles Vaucelle	Olivier Vannelle	Marc-Antoine Buhagiar	July 24, 2017	June 25, 2017	0.83
33	"Worst Day Ever"	Charles Vaucelle	Olivier Vannelle	Alexandre Hesse	July 24, 2017	June 25, 2017	0.83
34	"Monster Melon"	Charles Vaucelle	Eric Vérat	Gaston Jaunet	July 25, 2017	September 23, 2017	0.76
35	"Good Dog"	Charles Vaucelle	Jean-Marc Bouzigues	Richard Danto	July 25, 2017	September 23, 2017	0.76
36	"Pat's Big Heist"	Charles Vaucelle	Marine Lachenaud; Cédric Lachenaud	Yann Provost	July 26, 2017	July 23, 2017	0.85
37	"Hypno-Pat"	Charles Vaucelle	Simon Lecocq	Alexandre Hesse	July 26, 2017	July 29, 2017	0.90
38	"A Star Passes By"	Charles Vaucelle	Yves Coulon	Emmanuel Perez	July 27, 2017	July 29, 2017	0.90
39	"Bodyguard"	Charles Vaucelle	Jean-Marc Bouzigues	Lionel Brousse	July 27, 2017	October 7, 2017	1.06
40	"Fast and Clean"	Charles Vaucelle	Guillaume Mautalent; Sébastien Oursel	Charles Vaucelle	July 28, 2017	August 12, 2017	N/A
41	"The Guanos"	Charles Vaucelle	Olivier Vannelle	Marc-Antoine Buhagiar	July 28, 2017	August 12, 2017	N/A
42	"Maxi Golf"	Charles Vaucelle	Xavier Vairé	Lionel Brousse	July 31, 2017	August 12, 2017	N/A
43	"Marathon Pat"	Charles Vaucelle	Benjamin Le Bars	Emmanuel Perez	July 31, 2017	August 19, 2017	N/A
44	"A Day at the Museum"	Charles Vaucelle	Benjamin Le Bars	Lucile Vannier	August 1, 2017	August 19, 2017	N/A
45	"April Fool!"	Charles Vaucelle	Benjamin Le Bars	Alexander Petreski	August 1, 2017	August 26, 2017	N/A
46	"Disaster for Dinner"	Charles Vaucelle	Fred Monfort	Marc-Antoine Buhagiar	August 2, 2017	August 26, 2017	N/A
47	"Crunching Numbers"	Charles Vaucelle	Vincent De Mul	Alexander Petreski	August 2, 2017	August 19, 2017	N/A
48	"Geocaching"	Charles Vaucelle	Jean-Marc Bouzigues	Richard Danto	August 3, 2017	September 30, 2017	N/A
49	"Eyes Wide Open"	Charles Vaucelle	Olivier Vannelle	Lucile Vannier	August 3, 2017	August 26, 2017	N/A
50	"Tirouli"	Charles Vaucelle	Jean-Marc Bouzigues	Alexandre Hesse	August 4, 2017	September 30, 2017	N/A
51	"Bird-Brain Buffet"	Charles Vaucelle	Morgan Navarro	Gwénaëlle Sasaki	August 4, 2017	September 30, 2017	N/A
52	"Circus Chaos"	Charles Vaucelle	Benjamin Le Bars	Lucile Vannier	August 7, 2017	October 14, 2017	N/A
53	"Dances with Fleas"	Charles Vaucelle	Benjamin Le Bars; Marine Lachenaud	Marc-Antoine Buhagiar	December 14, 2017	October 14, 2017	N/A
54	"Dogfish"	Charles Vaucelle	Marine Lachenaud; Cédric Lachenaud	Marc-Antoine Buhagiar	December 14, 2017	TBA	N/A
55	"All Fired Up"	Charles Vaucelle	Yves Coulon	Marc-Antoine Buhagiar	December 15, 2017	October 14, 2017	N/A
56	"Face the Music"	Charles Vaucelle	Vincent De Mul	Emmanuel Perez	December 15, 2017	October 21, 2017	N/A
57	"Fundraising for Furballs"	Charles Vaucelle	Mélodie Begassat	Gaston Jaunet	December 15, 2017	TBA	N/A
58	"Shooting Stars"	Charles Vaucelle	Xavier Vairé	Emmanuel Perez	December 18, 2017	October 21, 2017	N/A
59	"No Rest for Pat"	Charles Vaucelle	Eric Vérat	Jean-Luc Abiven	December 18, 2017	October 21, 2017	N/A
60	"Robopat"	Charles Vaucelle	Simon Lecocq	Bernard Portier	December 18, 2017	TBA	N/A
61	"Pat Goes Green"	Charles Vaucelle	Mélodie Begassat	Emmanuel Perez	December 19, 2017	February 10, 2019	N/A
62	"The Bird Tree"	Charles Vaucelle	Vincent De Mul	Alexander Petreski	December 20, 2017	February 10, 2019	N/A
63	"Sir Pat the Knight"	Charles Vaucelle	Vincent De Mul	Gaston Jaunet	December 19, 2017	February 10, 2019	N/A
64	"Piñata Party"	Charles Vaucelle	Fred Louf	Olivier Thulliez	December 19, 2017	November 16, 2017	N/A
65	"Photo-Bomb"	Charles Vaucelle	Olivier Vannelle	Alexandre Hesse	December 21, 2017	November 16, 2017	N/A
66	"Player One"	Charles Vaucelle	Olivier Vannelle	Gwénaëlle Sasaki	December 21, 2017	November 16, 2017	N/A
67	"Punk Rock"	Charles Vaucelle	Olivier Vannelle	Marc-Antoine Buhagiar	December 20, 2017	November 23, 2017	N/A
68	"My Dog, the Hero"	Charles Vaucelle	Vincent De Mul	Bernard Portier	December 21, 2017	November 23, 2017	N/A
69	"Tricked Out"	Charles Vaucelle	Benjamin Le Bars	Alexander Petreski	December 20, 2017	November 23, 2017	N/A
70	"Inspector Pat"	Charles Vaucelle	Marine Lachenaud; Cédric Lachenaud	Lucile Vannier	December 22, 2017	November 30, 2017	N/A
71	"High Security Christmas"	Charles Vaucelle	Yves Coulon	Yann Provost	December 22, 2017	November 30, 2017	N/A
72	"Pat Academy"	Charles Vaucelle	Yves Coulon	Marc-Antoine Buhagiar	December 22, 2017	November 30, 2017	N/A
73	"The Gang Gangs Up"	Charles Vaucelle	Davide Tromba; Adriano Morosetti	Marc-Antoine Buhagiar	TBA	TBA	TBD
74	"The Interview"	Charles Vaucelle	Adriano Morosetti; Elisa Loche; Davide Tromba	Alberto Alvoni	TBA	TBA	TBD
75	"Phantom of the Park"	Charles Vaucelle	Adriano Morosetti; Elisa Loche; Davide Tromba	Alberto Alvoni	TBA	TBA	TBD
76	"Iron Pat"	Charles Vaucelle	Adriano Morosetti; Davide Tromba	Alberto Alvoni	TBA	TBA	TBD
77	"Piece of Cake"	Charles Vaucelle	Adriano Morosetti; Elisa Loche; Davide Tromba	Alberto Alvoni	TBA	TBA	TBD
78	"Smoothie Party"	Charles Vaucelle	Adriano Morosetti; Davide Tromba	Alberto Alvoni	TBA	TBA	TBD

=== Season 2 (2020–21) ===
No.	Title	Directed by	Written by	Storyboard by	Belgian air date	U.S. air date	U.S. viewers (millions)
1	"Collector"	Daniel Klein	Jérôme Erbin	Daniel Klein	TBA	TBA	TBD
2	"Superbowl"	Daniel Klein	Byron Kavanagh	Alexandre Hesse	TBA	TBA	TBD
3	"Blunder Bus"	Daniel Klein	Bob Mittenhal; Adam Cohen	Daniel Klein	TBA	TBA	TBD
4	"How Puzzling"	Daniel Klein	Byron Kavanagh	Alexandre Hesse	TBA	TBA	TBD
5	"Cake me Happy"	Daniel Klein	Jérôme Erbin	Patrick George	TBA	TBA	TBD
6	"The Sandwich"	Daniel Klein	Frank Ekinci	Patrick George	TBA	TBA	TBD
7	"Guanos and Juliet"	Daniel Klein	Christophe Courty	Thomas Fourniret	TBA	TBA	TBD
8	"Tank Gets the Blues"	Daniel Klein	Fiona Leibgorin	Sylvain Girault	TBA	TBA	TBD
9	"Day at the Museum"	Daniel Klein	Ségolène Basso Brussa	Thomas Fourniret	TBA	TBA	TBD
10	"3 Birds and a Basket"	Daniel Klein	Christophe Courty	Alexandre Hesse	TBA	TBA	TBD
11	"The Medal"	Daniel Klein	Adriano Morosetti; Davide Tromba; Elisa Loche	Mauro Gariglio; Gloria Clanci	TBA	TBA	TBD
12	"Inseparable"	Daniel Klein	Davide Tromba; Adriano Morosetti	Mauro Gariglio; Gloria Clanci	TBA	TBA	TBD
13	"Summersaults Under the Stars"	Daniel Klein	Sébastien Viaud; Suaëna Airault	Sylvain Girault	TBA	TBA	TBD
14	"Without a Sound"	Daniel Klein	Julien Leimdorfer; Gaël Leforestier	Sylvain Girault	TBA	TBA	TBD
15	"Voodoo"	Daniel Klein	Adriano Morosetti; Davide Tromba	Manuela Penna	TBA	TBA	TBD
16	"Sit, Stand, Heel"	Guillaume Rio	Christophe Courty	Serge Tanguy	TBA	TBA	TBD
17	"Kung-Fu Hamster"	Daniel Klein	Byron Kavanagh	Sylvain Girault	TBA	TBA	TBD
18	"The Flying Page"	Daniel Klein	Frank Ekinci	Patrick George	TBA	TBA	TBD
19	"Guanozilla"	Daniel Klein	Valérie Chapellet; Caroline Oustlant	Sylvain Girault	TBA	TBA	TBD
20	"The Ferret Sitter"	Daniel Klein	Sylvain Bousquet	Thomas Fourniret	TBA	TBA	TBD
21	"The Automated House"	Daniel Klein	Sylvain Bousquet	Patrick George	TBA	TBA	TBD
22	"The Mask"	Daniel Klein	Niccolo Dettore; Adriano Morosetti; Davide Tromba	Manuela Penna; Quentin Lebègue	TBA	TBA	TBD
23	"Special Delivery"	Daniel Klein	Adriano Morosetti; Davide Tromba; Domenico Busco	Marica Baglieri	TBA	TBA	TBD
24	"Tank Gets Amnesia"	Daniel Klein	Cédric Perrin; Pauline Rostain	Sylvain Girault	TBA	TBA	TBD
25	"Guano Scooter"	Daniel Klein	Benjamin Le Bars	Catherine Régnier	TBA	TBA	TBD
26	"Reducing your Pawprint"	Guillaume Rio	Sabine Dabadie; Anastasia Heinzl	Benjamin Culot	TBA	TBA	TBD
27	"Anything for Little George"	Daniel Klein	Julien Leimdorfer; Gaël Leforestier	Alexandre Hesse	TBA	TBA	TBD
28	"The Friendship Letter"	Daniel Klein	Julien Leimdorfer; Gaël Leforestier	Thomas Fourniret	TBA	TBA	TBD
29	"The Recruit"	Daniel Klein	Guillaume Cochard; Marie Manand	Patrick George	TBA	TBA	TBD
30	"Where is my Phone?"	Daniel Klein	Heinz Dabadie	Sylvain Girault	TBA	TBA	TBD
31	"The Wrong Bag"	Daniel Klein	Suaëna Airault; Sébastien Viaud	Sylvain Girault	TBA	TBA	TBD
32	"Fancy Fancy"	Daniel Klein	Byron Kavanagh	Lucile Vannier	TBA	TBA	TBD
33	"Tiki to the Limit"	Daniel Klein	Suaëna Airault; Sébastien Viaud	Sylvain Girault	TBA	TBA	TBD
34	"Relax Pat"	Guillaume Rio	Eddy Fluchon	Serge Tanguy	TBA	TBA	TBD
35	"Soap Box Derby"	Daniel Klein	Valérie Chapellet	Alexandre Hesse	TBA	TBA	TBD
36	"The Treasure Map"	Daniel Klein	Adriano Morosetti; Davide Tromba; Domenico Busco	Marica Baglieri; Gloria Clanci	TBA	TBA	TBD
37	"Mama Guano"	Daniel Klein	Niccolo Dettore; Adriano Morosetti; Davide Tromba	Francesca Chericoni; Quentin Lebègue	TBA	TBA	TBD
38	"The Lost Ring"	Daniel Klein	Sylvain Bousquet	Sylvain Girault	TBA	TBA	TBD
39	"Messy Bedroom"	Daniel Klein	Quentin Lebègue	Quentin Lebègue	TBA	TBA	TBD
40	"The Perfect Cabin"	Daniel Klein	Agnès Slimovici	Patrick George	TBA	TBA	TBD
41	"A Gift for Lola"	Daniel Klein	Valérie Chapellet	Ronan Lebrun	TBA	TBA	TBD
42	"Go Pat Go!"	Daniel Klein	Fred Monfort	Nicolas Livet	TBA	TBA	TBD
43	"Horsing Around"	Daniel Klein	Guillaume Lijour	Alexandre Hesse	TBA	TBA	TBD
44	"Favourite Toy"	Daniel Klein	Simon Lecocq	Lucile Vannier	TBA	TBA	TBD
45	"Imaginary Friend"	Daniel Klein	Marco Volpe; Adriano Morosetti; Davide Tromba	Marica Baglieri	TBA	TBA	TBD
46	"Fasting is Slow!"	Daniel Klein	Agnès Slimovici	Serge Tanguy	TBA	TBA	TBD
47	"Veggie Garden"	Daniel Klein	Sonia Gozlan; Cécile Nicouleaud	Patrick George	TBA	TBA	TBD
48	"Citizenship Day"	Daniel Klein	Valérie Chapellet	Patrick George	TBA	TBA	TBD
49	"Lucie's Doll"	Daniel Klein	Emille Gaudinot; Cédric Perrin	Sylvain Girault	TBA	TBA	TBD
50	"Birds and Castles"	Daniel Klein	Jean de Loriol	Ronan Lebrun	TBA	TBA	TBD
51	"Locked in the Museum!"	Daniel Klein	Sonia Gozlan; Cécile Nicouleaud	Sylvain Girault	TBA	TBA	TBD
52	"Scared of the Dark"	Daniel Klein	Elisa Loche; Adriano Morosetti; Davide Tromba	Marica Baglieri	TBA	TBA	TBD
53	"Diorama Drama"	Daniel Klein	Alex Donaro	Nicolas Livet	TBA	TBA	TBD
54	"Geometry Homework"	Daniel Klein	Matthieu Chevalier	Serge Tanguy	TBA	TBA	TBD
55	"Sewers Hideout"	Daniel Klein	Quentin Lebègue	Quentin Lebègue	TBA	TBA	TBD
56	"Pat Needs a Nap"	Daniel Klein	Olivier Jean-Marie; Frank Ekinci	Olivier Thulliez	TBA	TBA	TBD
57	"Spying Games"	Daniel Klein	Sylvain Bousquet; Lea Lespagnol	Sylvain Girault	TBA	TBA	TBD
58	"Last Minute"	Daniel Klein	Julien Leimdorfer; Gaël Leforestier	Lucile Vannier	TBA	TBA	TBD
59	"The Best Tomorrow of Our Lives"	Daniel Klein	Sylvain Bousquet	Nicolas Livet	TBA	TBA	TBD
60	"Hoodie Express"	Daniel Klein	Cédric Lachenaud	Olivier Thulliez	TBA	TBA	TBD
61	"Panic at the Bowling Alley"	Daniel Klein	Sylvain Bousquet	Sylvain Girault	TBA	TBA	TBD
62	"No Rest for Pat"	Daniel Klein	Valérie Chapellet	Alexandre Hesse	TBA	TBA	TBD
63	"Lost Dog"	Daniel Klein	Quentin Lebègue	Quentin Lebègue	TBA	TBA	TBD

=== Specials (2020–22) ===
No.	Title	Directed by	Written by	Storyboard by	Belgian air date	U.S. air date	U.S. viewers (millions)
1	"Santa Pat"	Daniel Klein	Marine Lachenaud	Nicolas Livet	TBA	December 25, 2020	TBD
2	"A Very Special Dog"	Daniel Klein	Jean-Luc Cano	Alexis Gachet	TBA	March 5, 2021	TBD
3	"Into the Wild"	Daniel Klein	Julien Leimdorfer; Gaël Leforestier	Olivier Thulliez; Dominique Monféry	TBA	August 5, 2022	TBD
4	"A Too Scary Story"	Daniel Klein	Byron Kavanagh	Patrick George	TBA	December 27, 2022	TBD
