= Satisfaction (2025 film) =

American action drama film

- Directed by: Alex Burunova
- Screenplay by: Alex Burunova
- Produced by: Alex Burunova; Kyle Stroud; Iryna Asonova; Rafael Thomaseto; Helena Sardinha
- Starring: Emma Laird; Fionn Whitehead; Zar Amir Ebrahimi
- Cinematography: Máté Herbai
- Music by: Midori Hirano
- Production companies: Perfect Circle Films; Driven Equation; Carte Blanche; Constant Production
- Release date: March 7, 2025 (SXSW)
- Running time: 96 minutes
- Countries: United States; Italy; Greece; Ukraine
- Language: English

Satisfaction is a 2025 psychological drama film written and directed by Alex Burunova, and starring Emma Laird, Fionn Whitehead and Zar Amir Ebrahimi.

== Cast ==
- Emma Laird as Lola
- Fionn Whitehead as Phillip
- Zar Amir Ebrahimi as Elena
- Adwoa Aboah as Angela
- Magaajyia Silberfeld as Ben
- Jacob Bruse as Man in the Shadows
- Nell Williams

== Production ==
The film is written and directed by Alex Burunova who said the writing of the script took over eight years. Burunova is also a producer for Perfect Circle Films, alongside Rafael Thomaseto and Helena Sardinha for Driven Equation, Kyle Stroud for Carte Blanche, and Iryna Asonova for Constant Production. Cinematography is from Máté Herbai with a score by Midori Hirano.

The cast is led by Emma Laird, with Fionn Whitehead, Zar Amir Ebrahimi and Adwoa Aboah.

== Release ==
The film had its world premiere at the SXSW Festival on 7 March 2025.
