= Borges and Me (film) =

2026 British film

- Directed by: Marc Turtletaub
- Screenplay by: Oren Moverman; Jay Parini; Ross Clarke
- Based on: Borges and Me: An Encounter by Jay Parini
- Produced by: Michael B. Clark; Tim Foley; Alex Polunin
- Starring: Peter Mullan; Alan Cumming; Freya Mavor; Luis Gnecco
- Cinematography: Christopher Norr
- Edited by: Joe Landauer
- Music by: Volker Bertelmann
- Production companies: A Private View; Big Beach; Lemming Film; Ossian Pictures
- Release dates: 15 August 2026 (Edinburgh); 15 August 2026 (UK)
- Running time: 109 minutes
- Country: United Kingdom
- Languages: English; Spanish

Borges and Me is a 2026 British biographical coming of age road drama film directed by Marc Turtletaub. The film chronicles the journey of a young American PhD student, Jay Parini, on a journey across the Highlands of Scotland with the Argentinian writer Jorge Luis Borges to meet the Orcadian poet, George Mackay Brown. The film is based on Parini's 2020 "embellished" or "novelised" memoir Borges and Me: An Encounter.

== Synopsis ==
In the early 1970s, a young American student, Jay Parini is studying for his PhD at St Andrews University, Fife, Scotland in a bid to escape the draft in the USA, where a number of his school friends have been called up. His tutor, the Scottish poet and translator Alastair Reid, asks him to take care of Jorge Luis Borges, the Argentinian poet, essayist and short-story writer, who is also partially blind.

The pair set off on a journey across the highlands in an erratic Morris Minor to meet George Mackay Brown in Orkney. Along the way they visit the birthplace of Alexander Selkirk, Lower Largo, the (world's first) Carnegie Library in Dunfermline, Loch Ness and the site of the Battle of Culloden.

== Cast ==
- Luis Gnecco as Jorge Luis Borges
- Fionn Whitehead as Jay Parini
- Peter Mullan as George Mackay Brown
- Alan Cumming as Alastair Reid
- Freya Mavor as Ailith
- Eilidh Loan as Bella Law
- Morven Christie as Miss Rose
- Dylan Blore as Father Burns
- Beth Marshall as Nurse Kelly
- Jennifer Winn as Peggy
- Gerry Lynch as Thomas
- Hanna Atwood as Jay's Wife
- Molly McGrath as Jane
- Jason Alan Staines as Ferry Passenger (uncredited)

== Production ==
The director Marc Turtletaub first came across Parini's memoir in a bookshop in Hawaii. After falling in love with the story, he took the journey covered in the book looking for possible shooting locations, even before he had acquired the rights. The film was a co-production between the Netherlands, Belgium, the UK, and the U.S. Luis Gnecco, the Chilean actor who plays Borges, read an enormous amount about Borges, watched interviews with Borges (and an obscure film that Borges had written), and interviewed someone who knew Borges. He even learned some Anglo-Saxon, which Borges recites in the film. The film was written by Oren Moverman, the second he had collaborated on with Turtletaub. The book's author, Jay Parini, was closely involved in the production and on set every day. It was filmed entirely in Scotland.

== Release ==
The film had its premiere at the Edinburgh International Film Festival in the Out of Competition strand on 15 August 2026.

== Critical response ==
Borges and Me received largely positive reviews from critics. Peter Bradshaw in The Guardian gave the film four out of five stars, calling it 'gently enchanting' with Gnecco's performance described as 'priestly, childlike, mischievous and sly'. The Variety review, by Guy Lodge, saw much to admire in the film: the Scottish locations shot by DP Christopher Norr, Gnecco's performance, and the emotional landscape that ranges from the humorous and fanciful to moments of poetry and poignancy. However, Lodge wondered whether the film might be a little lacking in depth.
