= Queers (TV series) =

- Created by: Mark Gatiss
- Country of origin: United Kingdom
- Original language: English
- No. of series: 1
- No. of episodes: 8

Production
- Producer: Mark Gatiss

Original release
- Network: BBC Four
- Release: 31 July – 3 August 2017

Queers is a 2017 eight-part drama directed and produced by Mark Gatiss. It was created as part of the BBC's cycle "Gay Britannia", to mark the 50th anniversary of the passing of the Sexual Offences Act 1967. The show features interviews with gay characters at the margins of the community. It was broadcast by BBC America in collaboration with AMC Networks.

== Episodes ==
The series has a total of 8 episodes, each consisting of one monologue. Every episode features a different speaker in a different year, spanning most of the 20th and the beginning of the 21st century.

No.	Title	Written by	Year	Character	Original release date
1	"The Man On The Platform"	Mark Gatiss	1917	Perce	July 31, 2017
2	"A Grand Day Out"	Michael Dennis	1994	Andrew	July 31, 2017
3	"More Anger"	Brian Fillis	1987	Phil	August 1, 2017
4	"Missing Alice"	Jon Bradfield	1957	Alice	August 1, 2017
5	"I Miss The War"	Matthew Baldwin	1967	Jackie	August 2, 2017
6	"Safest Spot In Town"	Keith Jarrett	1941	Fredrick	August 2, 2017
7	"The Perfect Gentleman"	Jackie Clune	1929	Bobby	August 3, 2017
8	"Something Borrowed"	Gareth McLean	2016	Steve	August 3, 2017

== Cast and characters ==
- Ben Whishaw as Perce, a soldier in World War I
- Fionn Whitehead as Andrew, a young man who took part in the protests after the defeat of a proposed amendment that would have equalized the age of consent of same-sex sexual activities to 16
- Russell Tovey as Phil, an actor
- Rebecca Front as Alice, the wife of a closeted gay man
- Ian Gelder as Jackie, a tailor recalling his experiences in World War II London
- Kadiff Kirwan as Fredrick, as an immigrant from the West Indies
- Gemma Whelan as Bobby, a woman posing as a gentleman
- Alan Cumming as Steve, a man preparing his wedding speech

== Reception ==
The Independent, discussing the visceral nature of the eight episodes, called them "dramatic gems". The Times said that the show was "funny, poignant and closely observed". In 2018, it was nominated for a GLAAD Media Award for Outstanding TV Movie or Limited Series.
