= Superprod Group =

French production company

- Industry: Media; Entertainment
- Founded: October 2010; 16 years ago
- Founders: Clément Calvet; Jérémie Fajner
- Headquarters: Paris, France
- Area served: Worldwide
- Key people: Clément Calvet (President & CEO); Jérémie Fajner (Managing Director)
- Divisions: Superprod Animation; Superprod Drama; Superprod Films
- Subsidiaries: 440HZ Music; Kids First Digital; Melusine Productions; Red Monk Studio; Superights Kids & Family; The Co-Production Company; Watch Next Media; Wheel in Motion
- Website: www.superprod.net/en

Superprod Group is a French independent audiovisual production company that was founded in October 2010 by former Gaumont Animation executives Clément Calvet and Jérémie Fajner that develops, produces, and distributes animated & live-action series and films under their division and subsidiaries. Their main animation production division that is part of the group was Superprod Animation who produce traditional, CGI and hybrid projects.

== History ==
Superprod Group was founded in October 2010 when it was originally established as an animation production studio after former Alphanim (now Gaumont Animation) CEOs and executives Clément Calvet and Jérémie Fajner had depatured Alphanim after it was acquired by film & television production and distribution company Gaumont two years before in 2008.

On May 7, 2013, Superprod Animation entered the distribution business by teaming up with investment firm Axone Invest to launch Superprod's own in-house international distribution division dedicated to distributing animation and live-action content named Superights Family Entertainment with Superprod's founders Clément Calvet and Jérémie Fajner managing Superprod's new distribution sales division alongside former M6 head of children's programming Morgann Favennec joining Superights as their head director of sales & acquisitions.

In September 2015, Superprod Animation expanded outside of their Paris-based animation studio by opening an animation production studio based in Angoulême to expand their animation production activities.

By July 2017, Superprod Group launched its digital arm named Superprod Digital and had appointed former Cyber Group Studios exec Carole Brin to head up Superprod's digital unit Superprod Digital as its chief digital officer of the newly created digital arm as Superprod Digital.

In February 2018, Superprod Group entered the American animation production market by establishing an US office based in Los Angeles to expand their international outfit with Superprod's former CFO Louise de Staël heading their new animation office

In June 2018, two years after Superprod Group acquired CGI animation production company Vanilla Seed, Superprod Group rebranded its Angoulême-based animation studio Vanilla Seed to Superprod Studio, reflecting their parent company's name for the rebranded Angoulême animation studio with the studio will handle all of Superprod's CGI productions. Three months later in September of that year, Superprod Group signed a three-year co-production partnership with recently-launch German animation studio Atmosphere Media to produce a state of six animated series and would be animated at Superprod's Angouleme-based Superprod Studio (renamed from Vanilla Seed three months prior) and at Atmosphere Media's Belgian studio Digital Graphics. Superprod and German animation studio Atmosphere Media would handle French and German-speaking rights with the former's distribution arm Superights handling international sales & distribution to them in other countries excluding Belgium. The two series were released part of Superprod's partnership with Atmosphere Media were That's Joey! (renamed from Joker Joe) and Anna & Friends (renamed from Anna & Frog).

In February 2021, Superprod Group announced that they've taken a majority stake in Milan-based Italian animation studio Red Monk Studio, marking Superprod's entry into the Italian animation production business with Red Monk Studio continued operating as a separate label from Superprod alongside its founders Lucia Geraldine Scott and Corrado Diodà which remained CEOs of the acquired company with former international sales manager of Superprod's division Superights Pedro Citaristi became managing director of Red Monk as part of the acquisition.

In late-September 2022, Superprod Group acquired New York-based American international production company The Co-Production Company to booster their American development and production activities with its founder Doug Schwalbe became president of Superprod's new American division Superprod US alongside former Cartoon Network executive Tatiana Krokar became the vice president of Superprod's American division.

In January 2023, Superprod Group announced that they've opened a new animation building in that same location as their expansion to its Angoulême-based production studio division Superprod Studio and their own Angoulême-based animation production studio along with the company developing their new pipeline deplay named 'Pipeline Flow' becoming the first European animation studio to use it & the first French animation studio to develop a fully integrated pipeline based on Pixar's USD technology.

In December 2023, Superprod Group launched the 360 degree CSR policy division named Superprod Impact with a focus that aims its commitment to eco-responsibility to the French animation ecosystem that is provided by the France 2030 investment.

In April 2024, Superprod Group acquired Luxembourgish animation production studios Melusine Productions and Studio 352 (who had previously produced Song of the Sea with Superprod) to strengthen their animation production activities and their ability to produce and finance their animated series & feature films, marking Superprod's expansion into the Luxembourg production activities with Melusine founder Stephan Roelants continuing to work with Melusine under Superprod.

Two months later in June of that same year following Superprod's acquisition of Luxembourg animation productions studios Melusine Productions and Studio 352, Superprod announced their entry into the British production activities by teaming up with former Netflix EMEA & Nickelodeon International executive Alexi Wheeler who was attending the French 2024 Annecy International Animated Film Festival at that time to launch a UK-based live-action & animation production subsidiary named Wheel In Motion, giving Superprod a British production subsidiary with the new subsidiary will focus on its live-action and animated projects.

In October 2024, Superprod Group acquired a majority stake in French animation company Watch Next Media. Watch Next Media remained under the leadership of its founder and CEO, Philippe Alessandri, while joining Superprod Group's portfolio of animation studios and production companies. Under the agreement, the company also gained access to Superprod's CGI animation expertise, financing capabilities, and production network.

In November 2024, Superprod Group had partnered with London-based British rights & international media company Coolabi to develop and produce a CGI animated series based on Adam Blade's successful fantasy book series entitled Beast Quest which were originally published by Orchard Books in the United Kingdom, Superprod Group will produced the upcoming CGI-animated series Beast Quest through its in-house Paris and Angoulême-based animation production studios under the Superprod Animation division in its country of France alongside Superprod's three production companies which were British company Wheel in Motion (marking its first production from Superprod's British arm Wheel in Motion), its American financial & production unit The Co-Production Company (which Superprod had brought in 2021) and its Rome-based Italian animation production unit Red Monk Studio while Coolabi's production arm Coolabi Productions will co-produce.

In February 2025 following Superprod Group's partnership with Watch Next Media back in October 2024 four months ago, Superprod Group under their distribution subsidiary Superights Kids & Family and Watch Next Media through its distribution arm Kids First Distribution announced a strategic merger of their own distribution catalogues and digital channels with Watch Next Media's production catalogue joining the catalogue of Superprod's own distribution subsidiary Superights became the biggest international distributor of children's programs as Watch Next's distribution subsidiary Kids First Distribution was renamed to Kids First Digital now focusing on their digital publishing activities with Superights will distribute Watch Next Media's future productions.

In June 2026 following the success of Superprod Group's partnership with StudioCanal for The Adventures of Paddington and Miffy & Friends, Superprod Group under its Superprod Animation division and French global film & television production/distribution company StudioCanal, via its television arm StudioCanal Television, announced they're adaptating the book series Toto The Ninja Cat created by former host of The X Factor, British personality and Irish broadcaster Dermot O'Leary into a animated 52-episode action-comedy TV series, Superprod Animation and StudioCanal via its television arm StudioCanal Television and StudioCanal's literary production arm StudioCanal Stories, one of the co-productions from the label, would co-produce while Superprod Animation would handle animation production services at its Paris and Angoulême-based animation production studios, Superprod's distribution unit Superights Kids & Family and StudioCanal would handle distribution to the new series whilst StudioCanal's kids & family unit, StudioCanal Kids & Family, would handle worldwide TV merchandising and licensing, emmy-winning head writers Nick Ostler and Mark Huckerby would serve as developers & would write episode for the series and O'Heary alongside his wife Dee Koppang would executive produce.

== Divisions & subsidiaries ==
=== Superprod Animation ===
==== Filmography ====
Title	Years	Network	Notes
Kila & Bob	2007–2015	Canal +	co-production with Submarine (Netherlands)
The New Adventures of Lassie	2014–2020	TF1; ZDF (Germany)	Also credited under the Superprod Studio name for season 2; Based on the character Lassie by Eric Knight; co-production with ZDF Enterprises, Classic Media and DQ Entertainment (season 1); Co-owned with ZDF Studios
Sophie la Girafe	2015		
Geronimo Stilton (season 3)	2016–2017	M6/France 5 Rai 2 & Rai Gulp (Italy)	inherited from MoonScoop co-production with Atlantyca Entertainment and Rai Fiction
Pat the Dog	2017–2021	Télétoon+ & Canal+ Family/France 4 & Disney Channel France; Rai Gulp (Italy)	Also credited under Superprod Studio for season 2; co-production with Animoka Studios, Grid Animation (season 1), Rai Com (season 1) and Rai Ragazzi (season 2)
Helen's Little School	2017	France 5; Knowledge Kids (Canada)	co-production with Muse Entertainment
The Adventures of Paddington	2019–2025	Gulli, M6 & Piwi+; Nick Jr. UK (United Kingdom); Nickelodeon (international)	under Superprod Studio; Based on Paddington Bear by Michael Bond; co-production with StudioCanal, Heyday Films and Blue Zoo Animation Studio; Right owned by StudioCanal
Go! Go! Cory Carson	2020–2021	Netflix	co-production with Kuku Studio and VTech
Anna & Friends	2022–23	France 5	Also credited under the Superprod Studio name; co-production with Atmosphere Media and Digital Graphics Animation
That's Joey	2022–2023	M6	under Superprod Studio; co-production with Atmosphere Media and Digital Graphics Animation
Batwheels	2022–present	HBO Max & Cartoon Network	Animation services only; Based on the DC Comics series Batman created by Bob Kane and Bill Finger; Produced by Warner Bros. Animation and DC Entertainment; Rights held by Warner Bros. Entertainment
Spirit Rangers	2022–2024	Netflix	under Superprod Studio; co-production with Netflix Animation Studios and Laughing Wild
Ghee Happy	2022–2023	Netflix	Animation services only; produced by Ghee Happy Studio
Lego Friends: The Next Chapter	2023–present	YouTube	Season 2 onwards; co-production with The Lego Group and Passion Pictures; Rights owned by The Lego Group
Supa Team 4	2023	Netflix	under Superprod Studio; co-production with Cake Entertainment and Triggerfish Animation Studios
The New Adventures of the Triplets	2024	France 5	co-production with Federation Kids & Family, Quad and Yann Zenou Entertainment
Harrison & Me	2025–present	France 3	co-production with Vivement Lundi
Underdog and the Canine Defenders	2025–present	Gulli & M6; Rai Gulp (Italy)	co-production with Red Monk Studio, Classic Media and DeAPlaneta Entertainment; A reboot of the 1960s series by W. Watts Biggers
Miffy & Friends	2025–present	Canal+ Kids; Sky Kids (United Kingdom)	Based on the characters by Dick Bruna; co-production with StudioCanal and Mercis BV
Frnck	TBA	France 3	Based on the hit comic series by Olivier Bocquet and Brice Cossu
Vet Academy	TBA	TF1	co-production with Red Monk Studio
Dinospital	TBA	TBA	
Heroic Football	TBA	TBA	
Asterix: the Kingdom of Nubia	TBA	M6 Studio; SND; Disney +; M6 Films	Sequel to Asterix: The Secret of the Magic Potion
Toto the Ninja Cat	TBA	TBA	co-production with StudioCanal Television and StudioCanal Stories; Based on the book series by Dermot O'Leary

=== Red Monk Studio ===
Red Monk Studio is a Milan-based animation production company founded in 2017 and became part of Superprod Group in 2020, specializing in 2D, 3D, and cut-out animation for children and adults as well as producing live-action programming for children and family entertainment

==== Productions ====
Title	Years	Network	Notes
Home Sweet Home	2023	Rai Gulp; Family Channel (Canada); ARD (Germany; CBBC (United Kingdom); HBO Max (United States)	co-production with First Generation Films
Lego Friends: The Next Chapter	2023–present	YouTube	Service work for Superprod Animation, The Lego Group and Passion pictures
New Adventures of the Triplets	2024	France 5	Service work for Superprod Animation
PiriPenguins	2025–present	Rai Yoyo; CBeebies (United Kingdom); PBS Kids (United States, upcoming)	co-production with Eaglet Films, Rai Kids, Banijay Kids & Family Distribution and PBS Distribution
Harrison and Me	2025–present	France 3	Service work for Superprod Animation
Underdog and the Canine Defenders	2025–present	Rai Gulp; Gulli & M6 (France)	co-production with Superprod Animation, and DeAPlaneta Entertainment; A reboot of the 1960s series by W. Watts Biggers
Vet Academy	TBA	Rai Gulp; TF1	co-production with Superprod Animation
Cyrano	TBA	Netflix; France Television	co-production with Melusine Productions and Nolita Cinema
Saddle Club	TBA	Rai Gulp; France 5 (France); ZDF (Germany)	co-production with ZDF Studios and Frog Box

=== Superprod Films ===
Title	Release date	Distributor	Notes
Dead Man Talking	October 3, 2012	Kanibal Films Distribution & Atypik Films uDream (Belgium)	co-production with Nexus Factory, Bidibul Productions and uFilm
Song of the Sea	December 10, 2014 (France/Belgium/Luxembourg); February 19, 2015 (Denmark); July 10, 2015 (Ireland)	Haut et Court; O'Brother Distribution (Belgium); StudioCanal (Ireland); Svensk Filmindustri (Scandinavia)	co-production with Melusine Productions, Cartoon Saloon, Big Farm and Noerlum Studios
Cafard	September 23, 2015 (Belgium); December 12, 2015 (France)	Eurozoom (France)	co-production with Tarantula Belgique, Tondo Films and Topkapi Films
Jailbirds	September 16, 2016	Rezo Films (France); France 2	under Superprod Films co-production with Orange Studio, Cine France, Rogue International, Nexus Factory, France 3 Cinema and Umedia
White Fang	July 6, 2018 (France)	Netflix	co-production with Bidibul Productions and Big Beach
Les Blaques de Toto	August 5, 2020 (France)	SND	co-production with SND and Bidibul Productions
The Lulus	January 18, 2023	Wild Bunch	co-production with Wild Bunch and Bidibul Productions
Les Blaques de Toto 2 - classe verte	August 2, 2023	SND	co-production with SND and Bidibul Productions
Mr. Blake at Your Service!	November 1, 2023 (France)	Universal Pictures International France	under Superprod Films co-production with Universal Pictures International and Bidibul Productions
Anatoile Latuile		Netflix; France 2 Cinema; UGC	Coproduction with Pyramide Productions
The Sunrise File		KMBO; Paramount Pictures International	Coproduction with Melusine Productions
The Kid	TBA	FilmNation Entertainment	co-production with Bidibul Productions and Big Beach

=== Watch Next Media ===
Watch Next Media
- Industry: Animation
- Founded: March 25, 2015; 11 years ago
- Founder: Philippe Alessandri
- Headquarters: Paris, France
- Parent: Superprod Group (2024–present)
- Subsidiaries: Kids First Digital; La Factorie Animation; Je Suis Bien Content
- Website: www.watchnextmedia.com

Watch Next Media is a French animation production studio part of Superprod Group that specialises in producing animated TV series. It was founded on March 25, 2015, by former Tele Images Productions CEO & president and former Marathon Images CEO & president Philippe Alessandri had stepped his role at both companies four months prior in November 2014.

==== History ====
Watch Next Media was established on March 25, 2015 when Philippe Alessandri had departed Zodiak-owned Tele Images Productions to launch a production company with offices based in Paris that will focus on high-profile animation and drama projects with Watch Next appointed former Tele Images development executive Sylvain Huchet to assist in development of its projects.

In November 2017, Watch Next Media partnered with French animation production company Monello Productions to launch a joint venture distribution subsidiary based in Boulogne named Kids First Distribution, giving Watch Next Media its own distribution subsidiary alongside Monello Productions reuniting Watch Next's founder and former Tele Images CEO & present Philippe Alessandri with former Tele Images producer & founder of Monello Giorgio Welter as Philippe leading the joint venture distribution subsidiary whilst Marie Lassal had been appointed to handle the joint venture distribution subsidiary as their head of sales; Watch Next would eventually take full control of the distribution subsidiary by acquiring the remaining 50% stake in Kids First Distribution from Monello Productions (which was acquired by Banijay from its previous parent Tetra Media Studio) four years later.

In December 2018, Watch Next Media acquired a minority stake in fellow animation production studio also based in Paris, Je Suis Bien Content, to booster Watch Next Media's European & international growth for the former and latter studios while Watch Next Media will collaborate with the newly-acquired studio Je Suis Bien Content to produce Best Bugs as Franck Ekinci and Marc Jousset would continue leading the acquired latter studio under Watch Next's minority ownership

In September 2020 following Watch Next's acquisition of a minority stake in Je Suis Bien Content back in 2018, Watch Next Media and its fellow production subsidiary Je Suis Bien Content had expanded the former's animation & post-production studio La Factorie into Lille by opening a new animation studio based in Lille that would bring all of Watch Next Media and Je Suis Bien Content's shows under the new Lille studio with Anaëlle Hersin will head La Factorie's new Lille-based studio as it would take over Watch Next's successful series Nate is Late for the second season.

Watch Next Media partnered with French animation production company Monello Productions in November 2017 to launch a joint venture distribution subsidiary based in Boulogne named Kids First Distribution, giving Watch Next Media their own in-house distribution subsidiary alongside Monello Productions reuniting Watch Next's founder and former Tele Images CEO & present Philippe Alessandri with former Tele Images producer & founder of Monello Giorgio Welter as Philippe leading the joint venture distribution subsidiary whilst Marie Lassal had been tapped to handle the joint venture distribution subsidiary as their head of sales; Watch Next would eventually take full control of the distribution subsidiary by acquiring the remaining 50% stake in Kids First Distribution from Monello Productions (which was acquired by Banijay from its previous parent Tetra Media Studio) four years later.

In February 2025, following Watch Next's partnership with Superprod Group back in October 2024 four months ago, Watch Next Media merged its distribution arm Kids First Distribution into Superprod's distribution subsidiary Superights Kids & Family with Watch Next Media's production catalogue joining Superights, gaining control of the Watch Next Media programming catalogue became the biggest international distributor of children's programs as Watch Next Media rebranded its distribution subsidiary Kids First Distribution to Kids First Digital now focusing on their digital publishing activities with Superights now distributing Watch Next Media's future productions.

==== Filmography ====
Title	Years	Network	Notes
Nate Is Late	2018–present	France 4 Super RTL (Germany)	co-production with La Factorie Animation and Nate Is Late Productions (season 1)
Boy Girl Dog Cat Mouse Cheese	2019–2024	Gulli, Canal J (seasons 1–2) & Gulli (season 3), Disney Channel France (season 3); CBBC (United Kingdom); RTÉ2 & RTÉjr (Ireland)	co-production with Cloudco Entertainment and Kavaleer Productions
Hello Kitty: Super Style!	2022–2024	Canal+ Kids; Rai Yoyo (Italy)	co-production with Monello Productions and Maga Animation Studio
Audrey's Shelter	2023–2024	France 4 TVOKids, TFO, Ici Radio-Canada Télé & Knowledge Network (Canada); Clan TVE (Spain); ZDF (Germany)	co-production with Image-in Atlantique and Peekaboo Animation
Vanishing Point	TBA	CBBC; France Televisions	co-production with BBC Studios Kids & Family and Kavaleer Productions
Donjons and Kittens	2025–Present	France Télévisions	Coproduction with Melusine Productions
Wild Katz	2025–Present	Gulli	

=== Wheel In Motion ===
Wheel in Motion
- Type: Production company
- Industry: Film and television
- Founded: 2024
- Founder: Alexi Wheeler
- Headquarters: London, England
- Parent: Superprod Group

Wheel in Motion (also known as WIM) is a British film and television production company based in London. Founded in 2024 by media executive Alexi Wheeler in partnership with Superprod Group, the company develops animated and live-action television series and films for children, family and young adult audiences.

==== History ====
Wheel in Motion was announced in June 2024 during the Annecy International Animation Film Festival. The company was founded by former Netflix and Nickelodeon executive Alexi Wheeler in partnership with Superprod Group, marking Superprod's first expansion into the United Kingdom.

Before founding the company, Wheeler spent five years at Netflix, serving as Director of Kids and Family Content before becoming Head of Animated Series for Europe, the Middle East and Africa (EMEA). Prior to joining Netflix, he served as Vice President of International Production and Development at Nickelodeon. According to its founders, Wheel in Motion was established to develop original animated and live-action television series and feature films targeting children, family and young adult audiences.

==== Productions ====
In October 2024, Wheel in Motion partnered with The Co-Production Company and August Media Group to co-develop Syrena's Mermaid Show, a preschool live-action/animated television series based on professional performer Syrena the Singapore Mermaid.

In May 2026, Wheel in Motion teamed up with Mind Candy and the two announced development of an animated television series based on the Moshi Monsters franchise as part of a broader relaunch of the brand.

In June 2026, Wheel in Motion partnered with Japanese publishing entertainment company Kadokawa Corporation and BBC Studios Kids & Family to produce live-action television adaptation of Kiki's Delivery Service, based on the novels by Eiko Kadono, the film was previously adapted by Studio Ghibli as an anime feature film directed by Mizaki Hayao, with the live-action version of the novels will start development.

==== Filmography ====
Title	Year	Format	Distributor/Network	Notes
Syrena's Mermaid Show	TBA	Television series		
Beast Quest	TBA	Television series		Coproduction with Superprod Animation and Coolabi
Moshi Monsters	TBD	Television series		With Mind Candy
Kiki's Delivery Service	TBD	Television series		Coproduction with BBC Studio Kids and Family
