= Manish Gandhi =

Indian theatre director and actor

- Born: Manish Gandhi; Chandigarh, Chandigarh, India
- Occupation: Stage director
- Years active: 2006–present

Manish Gandhi is an Indian theatre director and stage, film and TV actor. In 2006, he worked with the Government of Chandigarh to create a new theatre education programme for children in government schools. In 2009, he was awarded a scholarship from the Inlaks Shivdasani, Foundation after which he completed a stint at FTII, Pune.

== Theatre ==
In 2011, Gandhi directed (and acted in) Mike Bartlett's Cock for the youth theatre festival, Thespo, where it picked up two awards. The Mumbai Theatre Guide said the play raises "important questions but isn't as provocative as the title would suggest" but "Gandhi displays some acuity as the director." Noted critic Shanta Gokhale said the play "acquires a dimension that lies outside a mere love triangle."

In 2012, he directed Vikram Phukan's Limbo, which opened at Prithvi Theatre after a crowd-sourcing campaign. The play has strong movement elements and Mumbai Theatre Guide wrote, "it has the unbounded freewheeling feel of an exploration." The Times of India said, "what makes it unique is the dance and music routine, which has lots of interesting movements."

In 2013 he directed reality star Eijaz Khan in an adaptation of Anton Chekhov.

In 2017 he appeared in Natives at the Southwark Playhouse in London.

== Films ==
In 2010, Gandhi played the lead role in Rizwan, the film adaptation of a play of the same name. The FTII short-film directed by Deepti Khurana was screened at international film festivals, and won a special jury mention at the 5th ViBGYOR Film Festival of Kerala.

Gandhi has shot for the film Chai Shai Biscuits, a quirky comedy about arranged marriages.

In 2018, along with actress Sayani Gupta, Manish Gandhi was cast in a short film The Proposal.

In 2020, Angrezi Medium as Advait

=== Television ===
Year	Show	Role
2012	Crime Patrol	Aditya
2012	Haunted Nights	Anurag
2012	I Luv My India	Aeroplane
2012	Gumrah: End of Innocence	Harsh
2013	Na Bole Tum Na Maine Kuch Kaha 2	Addu (Fake)/Munna
