= Natives (play) =

Natives is a 2017 play by Glenn Waldron about digital natives, young people who grew up in the Information Age.

It premiered at the Southwark Playhouse in London in 2017, starring Ella Purnell, Fionn Whitehead and Manish Gandhi.

It was performed in Sydney in 2021 at the Kings Cross Theatre, directed by Charlie Vaux with the parts played by Fraser Crane, Sophie Strykowski and Ali Samaei.

== Publication ==
- "Natives". Nick Hern Books, 2017. ISBN 978-1848426399
