= A Damsel in Distress (musical) =

- Promotional poster
- Music: George Gershwin; Ira Gershwin
- Book: Jeremy Sams; Robert Hudson
- Basis: A Damsel in Distress by P. G. Wodehouse
- Premiere: 30 May 2015: Chichester Festival Theatre

A Damsel in Distress is 2015 musical written by Jeremy Sams and Robert Hudson, with music and lyrics primarily by George Gershwin and Ira Gershwin. A romantic comedy, the musical is based on the novel A Damsel in Distress by P. G. Wodehouse, the 1928 play adapted from the novel, and the 1937 musical comedy film A Damsel in Distress based on the novel and play. The musical ran from 30 May to 27 June 2015 at Chichester Festival Theatre.

== Main cast ==
- Richard Fleeshman as George
- Summer Strallen as Maud Marshmoreton
- Desmond Barrit as Keggs
- Isla Blair as Lady Caroline Byng
- Richard Dempsey as Reggie Byng
- Nicholas Farrell as Lord Marshmoreton
- Sally Ann Triplett as Billie Dore
- Melle Stewert as Alice
- Chloe Hart as Dorcas
- David Seadon Young as Pierre

== Production ==
The director and choreographer was Rob Ashford, the designer was Christopher Oram, and the musical supervisor was David Chase. The musical director was Alan Williams, the orchestrator was Bill Elliott, the lightning designer was Howard Harrison, and the sound designer was Paul Groothuis. Gabrielle Dawes and James Orange were the casting directors.

== Musical numbers ==
Act 1

- "Overture" – Orchestra
- "Things Are Looking Up" (from A Damsel in Distress) – Billie and Ensemble
- "Put Me To The Test" (from A Damsel in Distress) – George, Billie
- "Mine" (from Let 'Em Eat Cake) – Lord Marshmoreton
- "The Jolly Milkmaid And The Tar" (from A Damsel in Distress) – Keggs, Reggie, Alice
- "Nice Work If You Can Get It" (from A Damsel in Distress) – Maud, Alice
- "Feeling I’m Falling" (from Treasure Girl) – George
- "I’m A Poached Egg" (from Kiss Me, Stupid) – Reggie
- "You Are You" (from Song of the Flame) (Note: The music of "You Are You" is by George Gershwin and Herbert Stothart; the lyrics are by Otto Harbach and Oscar Hammerstein II. "You Are You". The Lester S. Levy Sheet Music Collection. Johns Hopkins University, Sheridan Libraries and University Museums.) – George, Alice, Reggie, Lord Marshmoreton, Lady Caroline
- "Stiff Upper Lip" (from A Damsel in Distress) – Billie, Pierre, Keggs, Dorcas and Ensemble
- "Evening Star" (unused song intended for Lady, Be Good!) – Maud
- "Feeling I’m Falling (Reprise)" – George

Act 2

- "Entr’acte" – Orchestra
- "I Can't Be Bothered Now" (from A Damsel in Distress) – Billie and Ensemble
- "Love Walked In" (from The Goldwyn Follies) – Lord Marshmoreton, Billie
- "French Pastry Walk" (from For Goodness Sake) (Note: For Goodness Sake is a 1922 musical with music primarily by William Daly Jr. and Paul Lannin (1894–1953), lyrics primarily by Arthur Jackson, and book by Fred Jackson. "The French Pastry Walk" has music by Daly and Lannin, with lyrics by Arthur Jackson and Ira Gershwin under his early pseudonym, "Arthur Francis." "French Pastry Walk". Library of Congress Catalog. Library of Congress.) – Dorcas, Pierre and Ensemble
- "Soon" (from Strike Up the Band) – Maud, George, Billie
- "Mine (Reprise)" – Lord Marshmoreton, Billie
- "Fidgety Feet" (from Oh, Kay!) – Reggie, George and Ensemble
- "Sing Of Spring" (from A Damsel in Distress) – Lady Caroline
- "I’m A Poached Egg (Reprise)" – Reggie, Alice
- "Mine (Reprise II)" – Lord Marshmoreton, Billie
- "A Foggy Day" (from A Damsel in Distress) – George
- "Finale" – Full Company

== Reception ==
Reviews were generally positive. BritishTheatre.com: "Sams and Hudson have done an excellent job of adapting this work for the stage, inventing and re-inventing parts of Wodehouse’s original wheel. The dialogue is snappy and effervescent, and the tone light and supple throughout. There might be a tad too much emphasis on George’s artistic angst than is strictly necessary or properly explained, but that does not really get in the way of the roller coaster of frivolity that the duo has here penned."

The Stage: "In an age of metamusicals from The Producers to the current Broadway hit Something Rotten, which offer their own ironic commentaries on the genre itself, A Damsel in Distress is both blissfully affectionate yet never affected as a young Broadway composer (Richard Fleeshman) and a British socialite (Summer Strallen) are set on an tangled but inevitable course towards each other in a dizzying, but always sincere, series of romantic collisions. Rob Ashford directs and choreographs an absolutely luxurious cast that includes hilarious turns from Richard Dempsey, Isla Blair and Desmond Barrit, and the brassily brilliant Sally Ann Triplett as the leading showgirl."

The Telegraph: "While complex characterization was perhaps not one of Wodehouse’s main preoccupations (there are several sour little quips around George’s desire to create serious, incomprehensible 'art', rather than mere shallow, enjoyable 'entertainment'), both Summer Strallen as Maud and Richard Fleeshman as George bring a sparky edge to their obstacle-filled romance, while the late-blooming love between Nicholas Farrell as Lord Marshmoreton, who always wanted to marry a showgirl, and Sally Ann Triplett as the girl of his dreams, equally at home on the stage or in the pigsty, is genuinely touching."
