= Robert Hudson (novelist) =

British novelist and comedy writer (born 1973)

Robert Hudson (born 1973) is a British novelist and comedy writer who has written journalism, particularly on sport and digital media, for many UK newspapers.

== Early life and education ==
Hudson was born in Zimbabwe, raised in Essex, and lives in Kilburn, London. He was educated at Jesus College, Cambridge, where he received a Ph.D. in intellectual history.

== Career ==
In 2007, the comedy musical Sherlock Holmes (the early years), for which he co-wrote the book, won the Theater for the American Musical award at the New York Musical Theatre Festival.

His novel The Kilburn Social Club, about a Premiership football club run on idealistic principles in an alternative version of modern London, was published by Vintage in 2009.

His second novel The Dazzle, about big game fishing in 1930s, was published by Vintage in 2013.

Since 2010, he has been curator and founder of the Kilburn-based comedy storytelling night Tall Tales, which has featured John Finnemore and Marie Phillips among others.

His comedy series Warhorses of Letters, co-written with Marie Phillips, was recorded for BBC Radio 4 starring Stephen Fry, Daniel Rigby, and Tamsin Greig and was first broadcast in October 2011. It ran for three series. The book of the series was crowd-funded through the Unbound platform.

His comedy series, Some Hay in a Manger, also co-written with Marie Phillips and starring Tamsin Greig, Joel Fry and Stephen Fry, was broadcast by Radio 4 over Christmas 2016.

He co-wrote a new version of the Gershwin/Wodehouse musical A Damsel in Distress with Jeremy Sams which was directed by Rob Ashford and first performed at Chichester Festival Theatre in June, 2015.

He wrote a new script for Frank Wildhorn and Jack Murphy's Wonderland, which was premiered in Edinburgh in 2017.

In 2020, BBC Radio 3 broadcast Magnitsky the Musical, which Hudson wrote with Johnny Flynn. The musical starred Flynn, Paul Chahidi, Fenella Woolgar and Ellie Kendrick, and was directed by Sasha Yevtushenko. It won Best Original Single Drama at the 2021 BBC Audio Drama Awards.

in 2022, BBC Radio 3 broadcast Hall of Mirrors, a musical about John Maynard Keynes and the Peace Treaties which ended the two World Wars which Hudson wrote with Susannah Pearse. The musical starred Jamie Parker and Patsy Ferran and was directed by Sasha Yevtushenko.

Also in 2022, BBC Radio 4 broadcast Rossum's Universal Robots, a new musical version of Karel Capek's R.U.R. which was again written with Pearse. The musical starred Paul Chahidi, Jasmine Hyde, Paul Hilton, Clare Foster, Annieka Rose and Matthew Durkan and was directed by Sasha Yevtushenko.

In 2023, BBC Radio 4 Broadcast Plane Speaking, a dramatisation of the systemic failings which led to the Boeing 737 Max crashes of 2018 and 2019. This starred Clare Foster and Fenella Woolgar and was directed by Sasha Yevtushenko.

== Books ==
- Hudson, R. (2009). The Kilburn Social Club. London, UK: Jonathan Cape. ISBN 9780224085847.
- Hudson, R. and Phillips, M. (2012) Warhorses of Letters. London, UK: Unbound.
- Hudson, R. (2013). The Dazzle. London, UK: Jonathan Cape.
