= A Damsel in Distress (novel) =

1919 novel by P. G. Wodehouse

- First edition (UK)
- Author: P. G. Wodehouse
- Language: English
- Genre: Comic novel
- Publisher: George H. Doran (US); Herbert Jenkins (UK)
- Publication date: 4 October 1919 (US); 15 October 1919 (UK)
- Media type: Print

A Damsel in Distress is a novel by P. G. Wodehouse, first published in the United States on 4 October 1919 by George H. Doran, New York, and in the United Kingdom by Herbert Jenkins, London, on 15 October 1919. It had previously been serialised in The Saturday Evening Post, between May and June of that year.

Its plot revolves around golf-loving American composer George Bevan who falls in love with a mysterious young lady who takes refuge in his taxicab one day. When he later tracks her down to a romantic rural manor, mistaken identity leads to all manner of brouhaha.

== Plot ==
Lady Maud Marsh, daughter of the widowed 7th Earl of Marshmoreton, is in love with Geoffrey Raymond, whom she met the previous summer in Wales. Maud has not revealed the man's name to her aristocratic family but has admitted that he is a penniless American. Her family, led by Lord Marshmoreton's haughty sister, Lady Caroline Byng, disapprove of the match and will not allow Maud to leave their home of Belpher Castle in Hampshire, in order to keep her from seeing the man. Lady Caroline wants her step-son, Reginald "Reggie" Byng, to marry Maud, though unbeknownst to her, Reggie is actually in love with Lord Marshmoreton's secretary, Alice Faraday. Lord Marshmoreton meekly listens to his sister, and to Alice, who is insistent that he write the history of his family, though he only wants to tend to his rose garden.

In London's Piccadilly, George Bevan, a bored and lonely American composer of successful musical comedies, sees a pretty girl in brown and laments that he has no justification to approach her, thinking that if only they were in the Middle Ages, he could approach her as a hero offering assistance to a damsel in distress. Depressed, George hails a taxicab, and is surprised when the girl in brown jumps into the cab and asks George to hide her. George wastes no time helping her hide from a stout, disagreeable, well-dressed young man. The man becomes angry and distracted when George knocks his silk hat off, allowing George and the girl to escape, but she soon disappears. George has fallen in love with her, though he does not know her name. Thanks to a newspaper report about the disagreeable young man (who spent the night in jail after punching a policeman), George discovers that the girl in brown was Lady Maud Marsh of Belpher Castle. He is not aware that she had sneaked off to London hoping to see Geoffrey.

The disagreeable man was Maud's brother Percy Marsh, Lord Belpher. At the castle, Percy mistakenly believes that George is the unsuitable man Maud is in love with, due to seeing her flee with him in a taxi, though Maud denies this. George, hoping to meet Maud again, rents a cottage near Belpher Castle. Meanwhile, George's friend and colleague Billie Dore, a chorus girl, visits the castle and bonds with Lord Marshmoreton over their shared love of roses.

George is able to see Maud again and offer further assistance to her, though Percy and Lady Caroline make it difficult for them to meet. Everyone at the castle comes to believe that George is the man Maud met in Wales, and George is delighted to hear from Reggie Byng and Lord Marshmoreton that Maud loves him. When George confesses his feelings to Maud, she explains that she loves a different man, Geoffrey Raymond. George is dejected, but remains a helpful friend to her. Reggie Byng elopes with Alice Faraday, and Lord Marshmoreton is relieved that Alice will no longer be his secretary. Billie tells the earl that George is rich due to his success as a composer and has good character.

Throughout these events, the servants of the castle are holding a sweepstake in which whoever drew the ticket with the name of the man Maud marries will win the money. At first, the cunning page-boy Albert is in a position to win if Maud marries "Mr. X" (an outsider, ostensibly the unknown American) and helps George, but after the butler Keggs (who drew Reggie Byng) blackmails Albert into trading tickets, Keggs becomes George's ally instead. Keggs convinces Lord Belpher to invite George to a dinner party at the castle, where George proves to be popular.

Lady Caroline and Percy continue to disapprove of George, but Lord Marshmoreton, who still believes George is the man Maud has wanted to marry all along, defies his sister and publicly announces that Maud and George are engaged. The earl also marries Billie. George suggests that Maud elope with Geoffrey to avoid awkward explanations. She meets with Geoffrey in London, only to discover that Geoffrey is nothing like she remembers. Though he has inherited a great deal of money, he is now overweight, talks only of food, and is being sued for breach of promise after a recent flirtation with another girl. Maud leaves Geoffrey and realizes she is in love with George. She tells George and they happily agree to get married.

== Publication history ==
The story was serialised between 10 May 1919 and 28 June 1919 in The Saturday Evening Post, with illustrations by Henry Raleigh.

The US edition of the novel has the dedication, "To Maud and Ivan Caryll". Ivan Caryll was a composer who had previously collaborated with Wodehouse on the 1918 Broadway musical The Girl Behind the Gun.

An excerpt from the novel was included in the 1939 omnibus Week-End Wodehouse (UK edition).

== Adaptations ==
The story was made into a silent film, also titled A Damsel in Distress, in 1919.

In 1928, Wodehouse collaborated with Ian Hay in adapting the book for the stage. Hay, Wodehouse, and A. A. Milne invested in the production, about which Wodehouse said "I don't think we shall lose our money, as Ian has done an awfully good job." The play, which opened at the New Theatre, London, on 13 August 1928, had a successful run of 234 performances. It was produced by Nicholas Hannen, and starred Basil Foster, Jane Baxter, and Reginald Gardiner.

Wodehouse was involved in adapting the novel as a musical in 1937. A Damsel in Distress is a 1937 English-themed Hollywood musical comedy film starring Fred Astaire, Joan Fontaine, George Burns, and Gracie Allen. With a screenplay by P. G. Wodehouse, loosely based on his novel of the same name, music and lyrics by George and Ira Gershwin, it was directed by George Stevens.

A Damsel in Distress was adapted into a stage musical of the same name, which ran from 30 May to 27 June 2015 at Chichester Festival Theatre.

The 2019 Indian Bollywood film Ek Ladki Ko Dekha Toh Aisa Laga was inspired by the book.
