= The Housekeeper =

Upcoming film by Richard Eyre

- Directed by: Richard Eyre
- Screenplay by: Rose Tremain
- Based on: The Housekeeper by Rose Tremain
- Produced by: Julia Taylor-Stanley; Kevin Loader; Herbert L. Kloiber
- Starring: Caitríona Balfe; Emma Laird; Anthony Hopkins; Helena Bonham Carter
- Cinematography: Andrew Dunn
- Production companies: Artemis Films; Embankment Films; Night Train Media
- Countries: United Kingdom; Germany
- Language: English

The Housekeeper is an upcoming romantic drama film directed by Richard Eyre, based on the novel of the same name by Rose Tremain. It stars Caitríona Balfe, Emma Laird, Anthony Hopkins, and Helena Bonham Carter.

== Cast ==
- Caitríona Balfe as Danni, a housekeeper
- Emma Laird as Daphne du Maurier
- Anthony Hopkins as Lord DeWithers
- Helena Bonham Carter as Adelaide

== Production ==
=== Development ===
The film was announced on 28 October 2024. It was presented at the American Film Market the following month.

=== Casting ===
Uma Thurman, Phoebe Dynevor, and Anthony Hopkins were announced as cast members on 28 October 2024. In January 2026, Thurman and Dynevor were replaced with Caitríona Balfe and Emma Laird, with Helena Bonham Carter also joining the cast.

=== Filming ===
Principal photography began on 10 February 2026, in Cornwall, with Andrew Dunn serving as cinematographer. Filming also took place at Knebworth House in Hertfordshire and Warner Bros. Studios Leavesden, and was completed by early May.

== Release ==
Embankment Films owns the global sales rights to the film.
