= Elden Ring (film) =

Upcoming dark fantasy action film

- Directed by: Alex Garland
- Written by: Alex Garland
- Based on: Elden Ring by FromSoftware
- Produced by: Andrew Macdonald; Allon Reich; Peter Rice; George R. R. Martin; Vince Gerardis
- Starring: Kit Connor; Cailee Spaeny; Ben Whishaw; Nick Offerman; Tom Burke; Havana Rose Liu; Sonoya Mizuno; Emma Laird; Peter Serafinowicz; Jonathan Pryce
- Cinematography: David J. Thompson
- Edited by: Barney Pilling
- Production companies: A24; DNA Films; Bandai Namco Entertainment
- Distributed by: A24 (United States)
- Release date: March 3, 2028
- Countries: United States; United Kingdom; Japan
- Language: English
- Budget: $200 million

Elden Ring is an upcoming epic dark fantasy action film written and directed by Alex Garland, and based on the 2022 video game Elden Ring developed by FromSoftware. It stars Kit Connor, Cailee Spaeny, Ben Whishaw, Nick Offerman, Tom Burke, Havana Rose Liu, Sonoya Mizuno, Emma Laird, Peter Serafinowicz, and Jonathan Pryce.

Elden Ring is scheduled to be released in the United States by A24 on March 3, 2028.

== Premise ==
In a place known as the Lands Between, the powerful Elden Ring has been shattered with its shards divided amongst corrupted demigods.

== Cast ==
- Kit Connor
- Cailee Spaeny
- Ben Whishaw
- Nick Offerman
- Tom Burke
- Havana Rose Liu
- Sonoya Mizuno
- Emma Laird
- Peter Serafinowicz
- Jonathan Pryce
- Ruby Cruz
- John Hodgkinson
- Jefferson Hall

== Production ==
In June 2024, Elden Ring (2022) director Hidetaka Miyazaki said he was open to a "very strong partner" adapting the game to other mediums. The game's worldbuilding writer George R. R. Martin teased a film or television adaptation a few days later, playfully denying knowledge. Shortly thereafter, director Alex Garland privately shared his experience playing Elden Ring with A24's head of film, Noah Sacco, impressing him to support pursuing an adaptation. After Garland wrote a 160-page spec script, accompanied by forty pages of imagery, Sacco flew him to Japan to sign a deal with FromSoftware, the developer of the game.

In May 2025, a live-action film adaptation was announced to be in development at A24, with Garland hired to write and direct the film. Additionally, Kit Connor joined the cast. In July, Cailee Spaeny and Ben Whishaw were reported to be in talks to star in the film. Connor, Spaeny and Whishaw would be officially confirmed to star in April 2026, with Nick Offerman, Sonoya Mizuno, Emma Laird and Jonathan Pryce among additional cast announced.

=== Filming ===
Principal photography began in April 2026 on location in the United Kingdom, including Scotland. Multiple locations around North Wales were used for filming in May, including Dinorwic quarry, Dolbadarn Castle, and Conwy Castle. Filming of scenes in Iceland took place in summer. According to The Wall Street Journal, the film's production budget is nearly $200 million. Filming wrapped on July 30, 2026. David J. Thompson served as the cinematographer.

=== Post-production ===
Post-production of Elden Ring has been overseen by Industrial Light & Magic. In October 2026, the film was revealed to be headed to the American Film Market the following month, reportedly as the largest production to be featured at the event to date. Ahead of the event, Amazon MGM Studios acquired pay-1 streaming rights to the film in a large number of international markets.

== Release ==
Elden Ring is scheduled to be released in the United States on March 3, 2028 in theatres and in IMAX.

== See also ==
- List of films based on video games
