= Big Beach (company) =

American independent film production company

Big Beach, LLC
- The current Big Beach logo from 2015 to present.
- Formerly: Big Beach Films
- Type: Private
- Industry: Motion picture
- Founded: 2004; 22 years ago
- Founder: Peter Saraf; Marc Turtletaub
- Headquarters: Los Angeles, United States
- Number of locations: 1
- Key people: Marc Turtletaub
- Services: Film production; Television production; Theatre
- Owner: Marc Turtletaub
- Divisions: Big Beach Television
- Subsidiaries: Beachside Films, Big Beach Reads
- Website: www.bigbeach.com

Big Beach, LLC is an American independent production company founded in 2004 by Marc Turtletaub and Peter Saraf, based in Los Angeles. It is best known for their independent comedy-drama films, including the Oscar-winning 2006 film Little Miss Sunshine.

== History ==
The company began when Turtletaub and Saraf co-produced the 2005 film Everything Is Illuminated. The new company then took over production duties on two films that had been developed by Turtletaub's previous production company, Deep River Studios: Duane Hopwood and Sherrybaby in 2005 and 2006. Turtletaub also had been developing Little Miss Sunshine with his former company, which he brought to Big Beach.

In 2014, Big Beach launched a television division of the company. The television division has produced Nuclear Family on HBO and the GLAAD-award-winning Vida, and were the studio for the series Sorry for Your Loss starring Elizabeth Olsen.

Big Beach's films include the Oscar-nominated A Beautiful Day in the Neighborhood starring Tom Hanks, The Farewell, which won the Independent Spirit Award for Best Film and the Audience Award at Sundance, and the 2006 Best Picture-nominee Little Miss Sunshine, which won the Academy Award for Best Original Screenplay, the SAG Award for Best Ensemble, and was considered a ground-breaking Independent film. The film's trajectory paved the way for increasing critical and commercial pathways of success for independent films.

In June 2022, Big Beach announced a number of new projects including the upcoming films Tropical Gothic and Out of My Mind. In February, 2022, Big Beach moved its headquarters to their Los Angeles-based offices. They announced that they had fully relocated to Los Angeles in January 2024, and that their upcoming movies Out of My Mind and Winner were set to premiere at the 2024 Sundance Film Festival.

In 2024 Big Beach announced an IP incubator and division focused on adaptations called Big Beach Reads. The Big Beach Reads division handled the company’s book club and held a series of initiatives focusing on film development. In 2026 it was announced that Big Beach Reads had become an independent company managed by former Big Beach executive and producer Halle Arbaugh. The move echoed the transition of Beachside films, which began as part of Big Beach Films and became independent.

== Filmography ==
=== Films ===
Big Beach has produced or co-produced the following films:

Year	Film	Co-producer	Distributor	Release date	Budget (USD)	Box office (USD)
2005	Everything Is Illuminated	None	Warner Independent Pictures	16 September 2005	$7 million	$3.6 million
2005	Duane Hopwood	None	IFC Films	11 November 2005	$1 million	—N/a
2006	Little Miss Sunshine	Bona Fide Productions; Deep River Productions; Third Gear Productions	Fox Searchlight Pictures	26 July 2006	$8 million	$100.5 million
2006	Sherrybaby	Elevation Filmworks; Red Envelope Entertainment	IFC Films	8 September 2006	$2 million	$600K
2007	Chop Shop	None	Entertainment One Films	27 February 2007	—N/a	$200K
2008	Is Anybody There?	Heyday Films; BBC Films	Optimum Releasing	7 September 2008	—N/a	$3.3 million
2008	Sunshine Cleaning	HanWay Films	Overture Films	13 March 2009	$5 million	$16.6 million
2009	Away We Go	Neal Street Productions	Focus Features	5 June 2009	$17 million	$14.9 million
2010	Lucky	None	N/A	24 January 2010	—N/a	—N/a
2010	Jack Goes Boating	None	Overture Films; Relativity Media	17 September 2010	—N/a	$620K
2011	Our Idiot Brother	Likely Story	The Weinstein Company; Miramax	26 August 2011	$5 million	$25.9 million
2012	Safety Not Guaranteed	Duplass Brothers Productions	FilmDistrict	8 June 2012	$750K	$4.4 million
2013	The Kings of Summer	Low Spark Films	CBS Films	31 May 2013	—N/a	$1.3 million
2015	3 Generations	InFilm Productions	The Weinstein Company	12 September 2015	$5 million	$680,351
2016	Me Him Her	None	Filmbuff	4 March 2016	—N/a	—N/a
2016	Loving	Random Films; Augusta Films; Tri-State Pictures	Focus Features	4 November 2016	$9 million	$12.9 million
2018	White Fang	Superprod Animation; Bidibul Productions	Netflix	6 July 2018	—N/a	$7.8 million
2018	Puzzle	Olive Productions	Sony Pictures Classics	27 July 2018	—N/a	—N/a
2019	The Farewell	Ray Productions; Depth of Field; Kindred Spirit	A24	12 July 2019	$3 million	$23.1 million
2019	A Beautiful Day in the Neighborhood	Tencent Pictures	TriStar Pictures	22 November 2019	$25 million	$68.4 million
2021	Land	Cinetic Media	Focus Features	12 February 2021	—N/a	—N/a
2022	Don't Make Me Go	De Line Pictures	Amazon Studios	15 July 2022	—N/a	—N/a
2023	Jules	None	Bleecker Street	11 August 2023	—N/a	—N/a
2024	Winner	ShivHans Pictures; 1Community	Vertical	13 September 2024	—N/a	—N/a
2024	Out of My Mind	Walt Disney Pictures; Participant Media; Reunion Pacific Entertainment; EveryWhere Studios	Disney+	22 November 2024	—N/a	—N/a
TBA	The Kid	Superprod Animation; Bidibul Productions	FilmNation Entertainment	TBA	—N/a	—N/a

=== Television ===
Year(s)	Title	Seasons	Creator(s)	Network
2015	New Timers	2 seasons, 9 episodes	Matt Porter; Charlie Hankin	Comedy Central
2018	Vida	3 seasons, 22 episodes	Tanya Saracho	Starz
2018	Sorry for Your Loss	2 seasons, 20 episodes	Kit Steinkellner	Facebook Watch
2021	Nuclear Family	1 season, 3 episodes	Ry Russo-Young	HBO

=== Theatre ===
Release year	Title	Director	Author	In-production
2005	Of Mice and Men	Anna D. Shapiro	John Steinbeck	No
2008	Sleepwalk with Me	Seth Barrish	Mike Birbiglia	No
2015	Sylvia	Daniel J. Sullivan	A. R. Gurney	No
