= Marie Phillips =

British writer (born 1976)

- Born: 22 April 1976 (age 50); London, England
- Education: BA (Hons), MA
- Alma mater: Robinson College, University of Cambridge
- Occupation: Novelist
- Writing career
- Genres: Humour, fantasy
- Notable works: Gods Behaving Badly, Warhorses of Letters, The Table of Less Valued Knights
- Website: www.mariephillips.co.uk

Marie Phillips (born 22 April 1976) is a British writer. She is best known for her debut novel, Gods Behaving Badly, a comic fantasy concerning ancient Greek gods living in modern-day Hampstead. It was first published in the United Kingdom in 2007, later becoming a bestseller in Canada. Her second novel, The Table of Less Valued Knights is a comic take on the world of King Arthur. It was published in the UK in 2014 and nominated for the 2015 Baileys Women's Prize for Fiction. Her third novel, a Shakespearean comedy entitled Oh, I Do Like To Be... was released in 2018.

She is the daughter of Nicholas Phillips, Baron Phillips of Worth Matravers.

== Life and career ==
Phillips was born in London and educated at Bryanston School and Robinson College, Cambridge, where she read social anthropology. After university, she worked as a researcher in television documentaries and current affairs, interrupting this career for a year to complete an MA in visual anthropology at the University of Manchester.

In 2003, she quit television completely to pursue a career as a writer. Phillips's first novel, The Talentless Miss Pigeon, was turned down by publishers. She worked in bookshops while writing her second novel, Gods Behaving Badly. On the advice of a representative from Random House, Phillips submitted the second work to Dan Franklin, the publishing director of Jonathan Cape, who purchased the UK and Commonwealth rights.

Phillips left bookselling in 2007 to concentrate on writing. She also has a regular personal blog on tumblr.com, which often includes reviews of literature, theatre, and film, as well as current television and radio. She was a writer-in-residence for the charity First Story at Harris Academy Bermondsey 2009-10, and at Acland Burghley School in London in 2011.

With Robert Hudson she wrote three series of Warhorses of Letters, a BBC Radio 4 comedy about the horses of Napoleon and Wellington starring Stephen Fry, Daniel Rigby and Tamsin Greig. The book of the first series was crowd-funded through the Unbound platform and released in 2012. In 2016 they collaborated on the Christmas series Some Hay In a Manger, also for BBC Radio 4.

Writing with various others under the pseudonym Vanessa Parody, she co-authored the 2013 erotic spoof Fifty Shelves of Grey.

== Gods Behaving Badly ==
Phillips conceived the idea for Gods Behaving Badly while listening to a philosophy teacher's comparison between the Christian God and those of the ancient world:

He was saying that the gods of the ancient world had flaws, they were more human, and I suddenly thought, what if they were right? There is something arbitrary about belief; if you are a Christian, then you have to believe that the Hindus are wrong, and the other way round. You can back your beliefs up with archaeology or sacred texts, but ultimately it comes down to siding with one team or another. And I thought – what about the Greeks? No one sides with that team any more, but what if they were the ones who got it right? So here's this group of gods, imagine if they were still around...

She drew further inspiration for the novel's plot from the legend of Orpheus and Eurydice.

Gods Behaving Badly is Phillips's first published novel. It was released in the UK to largely positive reviews, and has been sold to over 12 countries. including Canada, where it reached #1 in the top-selling fiction list. It was originally optioned for television by Ben Stiller's Red Hour Productions, and was made into a 2013 movie starring Sharon Stone, Alicia Silverstone and Christopher Walken by Big Beach Films.
