= Lassie (2014 TV series) =

- Also known as: The New Adventures of Lassie
- Genre: Comedy-drama; Adventure
- Created by: Eric Knight (character)
- Developed by: Jill Brett
- Directed by: Jean-Christophe Roger (season 1); Dominique Monféry (season 2)
- Voices of: Mirabelle Kirkland; Kaycie Chase; Maxime Jarquin; Matthew Géczy; Sharon Mann
- Composers: Guy Michelmore (season 1); Laurent Aknin (season 2)
- Countries of origin: France; Germany; India (S1)
- Original language: English
- No. of seasons: 2
- No. of episodes: 52

Production
- Executive producers: Clément Calvet (S1); Jérémie Fajner (S1); Eric Ellenbogen; Doug Schwalbe; Nicole Keeb (S2); Tapaas Chakravati (S1); Rouhini Jaswal (S1); Sumedha Saraogi (S1); Arne Lohmann (S2)
- Producers: Clément Calvet (S2); Jérémie Fajner (S2)
- Running time: 22–23 minutes
- Production companies: Superprod Animation; ZDF Enterprises; DQ Entertainment (season 1)

Original release
- Network: TF1/Télétoon+ (France); ZDF/KIKA (Germany)
- Release: 2014 – 2020

Lassie (also known as The New Adventures of Lassie) is an animated television series based on the classic character by Eric Knight. The series is produced by Superprod Animation in France and DQ Entertainment (S1) in India, in co-production with German broadcaster ZDF and their production/sales arm ZDF Enterprises, with the participation of Classic Media, TF1 and Télétoon+. Season 1 was produced with traditional 2D animation while Season 2 transitioned to Cel shading.

== Characters ==
Zoe and Lassie with their family and friends.

=== Main characters ===
- Lassie

The title character of the show, Lassie is a brown and white collie who lives in the Grand Mountain National Park with her owners, the Parker family. Fearless and brave, Lassie will never hesitate to put her life on the line for her family, friends and even random people she may or may not have met before.

For the majority of the episode durations, Lassie will only communicate through her body language and barks, which are only understood by those who know her well. However, she can "talk" to her animal friends from the Red Barn.

- Zoe Parker

Owner of Lassie and daughter of Sarah and Graham. Having inherited her parents' love of nature, Zoe cares a great deal about life in the park and goes out of her way to protect it, sometimes without thinking and ultimately putting her life at risk. Zoe often takes care of baby animals whenever they need her help. She is normally the one to call Lassie in the day old style, whether there is an emergency or not.

- Chief Ranger Graham Parker

Head of the Grand Mountain National park Ranger Department, Graham, like the rest of his family, is a nature lover committed to preserving the serenity of the park.

He once owned a dog that was similar in breed and personality to Lassie, named Shadow, when he was a boy. Sadly, when Graham was eight years old, Shadow was bitten by a snake as he tried to save Graham. Graham, who didn't fully understand at the time, thought he was responsible for the death of his dog and ultimately, even the death of his grandfather, who got sick and died a short while after Shadow, and thus distanced himself from the cabin owned by his grandfather. He later discovered, thanks to Lassie, Zoe and Harvey, that this was not the case and that his grandfather's sickness and death was purely down to something else, more than likely old age. Graham also revealed that, whilst he never actually visited the property since the Shadow incident up until the point that he returned to face his fears, he was still keeping up the mortgage on the property and surrounding land, meaning the Parker family still owned the property, which ultimately prevented Robert Humphrey from selling it to developers looking to build a leisure hotel.

- Dr. Sarah Parker

As the National Park's resident veterinarian, Sarah takes pride in her work, caring for any animal that may need her medical knowledge. Like her husband and daughter, Sarah is quick to express outrage whenever someone or something is threatening the tranquility of the park.

- Harvey Smith

Zoe's best friend. A skilled navigator, like his late father, Jason Smith, Harvey always has a route planned out. He will often follow Zoe and Lassie in their adventures, even if the situation may seem dangerous.

- Mrs. Beth Smith

Mother of Harvey Smith and supposedly a member of staff at the National Park's visitor center. As Harvey is all she has to remember her husband by, Beth is often concerned whenever Harvey could be in danger. Luckily, she knows that, wherever there's danger, Lassie won't be far.

- Samantha Humphrey

Zoe and Harvey's snooty rival and Robert Humphrey's niece with brown hair. She sometimes throws herself into dangerous situations without thinking anything through.

- Mr. Robert Humphrey

Owner and manager of the Valley Hotel. He is sometimes a minor antagonist, as some of his schemes to drum up tourists can often result in him doing some unscrupulous things, such as in one episode when he told the driver of an old steam locomotive, that was about to haul a trainload of tourists down an older line of track, that he had personally inspected every inch of the line himself to ensure that it was safe, when in fact, he had not.

- Mrs. Ida Lee

Proprietor of the National Park's general store, 'The Happy Camper', Mrs. Lee may look like any ordinary old lady, but she is far from it, as a couple of poachers learnt when she demonstrated her skills as a rodeo champion by hogtying them whilst they tried to capture a bear cub. She is the owner of Biff the pug, who she often has taken the Parker's morning paper to them.

== Production ==
The series was first announced in June 2009 as a co-production between Lassie owners Classic Media, DQ Entertainment (who Classic Media previously co-produced Casper's Scare School with them), and broadcasters M6 and ZDF. The series would be a U.K.-Ireland-France-Germany-India co-production, with Classic Media co-producing through their UK offices. The series was planned to be computer-animated and delivered for a late-2010-early-2011 window.

In October 2010, DQ announced that Superprod Animation and Storyboard Animation in France had joined animation production, while TF1 would replace M6 as the show's French broadcast partner. Distribution would be shared between the studios, with Superprod handling French-speaking Europe, ZDF through its production arm ZDF Enterprises for German-speaking Europe, and DQ Entertainment and Classic Media for all remaining territories. The series was now set for a 2012 delivery window.

== Episodes ==
=== Season 1 (2014–15) ===
Season 1 aired 26 episodes from 2014 to 2015.

Season 1
Episode	Title
1	Saving Zuli!
2	Poachers in the Park!
3	Gold Rush!
4	Danger on the Mountain
5	The Treasure of Dan Montaigne
6	Forest Fire!
7	Spider Bite!
8	Roundup!
9	Night of the Wolves
10	Avalanche
11	The Day Off
12	The Tornado Hunters
13	Where's Lassie
14	Who Knows Best
15	Hide and Seek!
16	Frances' Garden
17	The Iron Horse of Grand Mountain
18	The Demon of Diamond Lake
19	Thin Ice
20	Trapped
21	Momma Zoe
22	Condors in the Valley
23	Harvey's Journey
24	The Secrets of the Parker Clan
25	The Grand Mountain Adventure Challenge 1
26	The Grand Mountain Adventure Challenge 2

=== Season 2 (2020) ===
A season 2 with 26 episodes aired as of January 2020.

Unlike the first season, it uses computer-animated characters in front of hand-drawn backgrounds as Indian animation studio DQ Entertainment stepped down from co-producing the series, giving Superprod Animation fully producing the series with its Angoulême-based animation unit Superprod Studio taking over.

These episodes appear on CBS All Access, but are tagged as "Season 1." The copyright on them is 2016.

Season 2
Episode	Title
1	Friends Forever Part 1
2	Friends Forever Part 2
3	The Great Scavenger Hunt
4	Maiden Flight
5	A Wild Encounter
6	Trick or Treat
7	White Out
8	Trespassing
9	The Blueberry Pie Challenge
10	Old Doc Dudley
11	Inside the Dam
12	The Precious Gift
13	Picture Perfect
14	The Star Attraction
15	Mrs. Lee's Secret
16	The Reunion
17	The Epidemic
18	A Rare Sighting
19	Like Father, Like Daughter
20	Déjà Vu
21	Face Your Fear
22	Wild Camping
23	The Visitor Center
24	A Shaky Reputation
25	False Accusations
26	The Soapbox Grand Prix

== Broadcast ==
In the United Kingdom, the show premiered on Pop UK TV on 6 June 2016. In 2016, an official YouTube channel featuring episodes from the series was launched.

In the United States, Lassie debuted on ViacomCBS's streaming service CBS All Access on January 17, 2020. After the service was relaunched with a new name (Paramount+) in 2021, the show was carried over to the ParamountPlus.com site.
