= Borges and Me: An Encounter =

2020 memoir by Jay Parini

Borges and Me: an Encounter is a 2020 memoir by Jay Parini that recounts a road trip he took as a young man through the Scottish Highlands with the renowned Argentine writer Jorge Luis Borges. The book reconstructs decades-old conversations and events from memory, with Parini describing it as a "novelized memoir." The novel was adapted into the 2026 film of the same name directed by Marc Turtletaub.

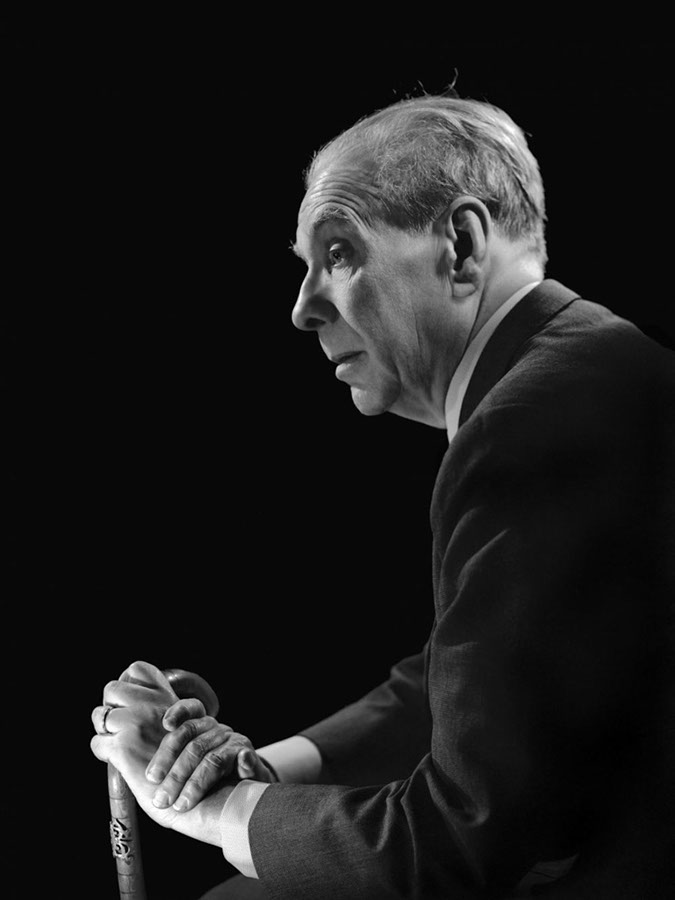
Portrait of Jorge Luis Borges, by Annemarie Heinrich, 1967.

== Background ==
Jay Parini was in his early 20s in 1970 and decided he needed to study abroad. He wanted to avoid the Vietnam era draft and get away from his "suffocating Pennsylvania family." He enrolled in a doctoral program at the University of St Andrews in Scotland. Borges was visiting the school; Parini was mentored by one of his translators, Alastair Reid. Reid was going away for a few days and asked Parini to watch over Borges. Borges asked Parini to take him on an auto tour of the Scottish Highlands. Borges was blind, needing Parini to drive and describe everything. At the time of the trip, Parini was unaware of Borges' reputation and work.

== The journey ==
Throughout the trip they had conversations about life, literature and philosophy; these left a lasting impression on Parini. Parini describes many interesting anecdotes of the trip. These events have been described "as somewhere between truth and fiction, between recollection and reimagination." Among other recollections are Parini and Borges getting lost in a maze in Scone, something "very Borgesian"; Parini saving the life of Borges when he stood up in a rowing boat on Loch Ness reciting lines of Beowulf; and, Borges hallucinating ghosts on the field of Culloden.

== Reception ==
Kirkus Reviews called the book "a captivating homage." Michael Greenberg (New York Times) wrote that Parini: "Brings Borges more sharply to life than any account I’ve read or heard. . . In this sense, the memoir is an important contribution to the biography of a major writer. . . For readers who already admire Borges, this memoir will be a delicious treat. For those who have yet to read him, Parini provides the perfect entry point to a writer who altered the way many think of literature." Steve Paul (Booklist): "Fans of both Borges and Parini will delight in this touching coming-of-age memoir."

== Film adaptation ==
Borges and Me: An Encounter was adapted into a film directed by Marc Turtletaub, which premiered at the Edinburgh International Film Festival on August 15th, 2026.
