= Cafard =

2015 animated war feature film by Jan Bultheel

- Directed by: Jan Bultheel
- Written by: Jan Bultheel
- Music by: Hans Helewaut
- Production companies: Tarantula Belgique; Superprod Animation; Tondo Films; Topkapi Films
- Distributed by: Eurozoom
- Release dates: September 23, 2015 (Belgium); December 12, 2015 (France)
- Running time: 92 minutes
- Countries: France; Netherlands; Belgium
- Languages: French; Dutch

Cafard is a 2015 French-Dutch-Belgian animated war film written and directed by Jan Bultheel. The film tells the story of a boxer, Jean Mordant (based on the real-life Henri Herd, known as Constant le Marin), who joins the Belgian Expeditionary Corps which is sent to the Russian Empire during World War I in order to avenge the rape of his daughter by German soldiers in Occupied Belgium.

== Voice cast ==
| Role | French dub | Dutch dub |
|---|---|---|
| Jean Mordant | Benoît Magimel | Wim Willaert |
| Victor | Jean-Hugues Anglade | Sebastien Dewaele |
| Jelena Dimitrieva Doctorow | Julie Gayet | Dinara Droukarova |
| Guido | | Maarten Ketels |
| Édouard Coppenole | | Benoit Gob |

== Release and reception ==
The film was theatrically released in Belgium on 23 September 2015, and in France on 12 December. It grossed $20,771 in Belgium, and received positive reviews from critics.

=== Accolades ===
| Award | Date of ceremony | Category | Recipient(s) | Result | Ref. |
|---|---|---|---|---|---|
| Magritte Awards | 6 February 2016 | Best Flemish Film | Cafard | Nominated | |
