= Gods Behaving Badly =

2007 novel

Gods Behaving Badly: a novel and movie
- First edition (UK)
- Author: Marie Phillips
- Language: English
- Genre: Humor, Fiction
- Publisher: Jonathan Cape (Aug 2007, UK); Little, Brown (Dec 2007, US)
- Publication place: United Kingdom
- Media type: Print (Hardback)
- Pages: 307
- ISBN: 978-0-316-06762-1
- Dewey Decimal: 823'.92 -- dc22
- LC Class: PR6116.H49G63 2007

Gods Behaving Badly is a novel by the British author Marie Phillips. It was first published by Jonathan Cape in 2007. Set in London, it tells the tale of the twelve gods of Mount Olympus living in a rundown flat as their powers wane. It was selected for The Atlantic's 1book140 Twitter book club's book of the month for August 2011.

== Synopsis ==
A young woman named Alice finds a job as a cleaning lady in a London flat. She is unaware that the tenants are Greek gods, fallen into disgrace because nobody believes in them anymore. Apollo falls in love with Alice, but when he discovers that she is already in love with a man named Neil, he tricks Zeus into killing her with lightning.

Feeling guilty, he tries to apologize to Neil, but winds up blocking out the sun in a fit of anger. At that moment, Apollo loses his energy and dies, leaving the world without a sun. Neil descends into Hades in search of Alice's and Apollo's souls, intent on resurrecting his beloved and saving the world.

== Characters ==
=== Gods and Goddesses ===
- Aphrodite
- Apollo
- Ares
- Artemis
- Athena
- Eros
- Dionysus
- Hephaestus
- Hermes
- Zeus
- Demeter
- Styx

=== Humans ===
- Alice
- Neil

== Film adaptation ==
The novel was adapted into a 2013 film directed by Marc Turtletaub. The setting was changed from London to New York City; it starred Alicia Silverstone, Sharon Stone, and Oliver Platt. The film premiered at the 2013 Rome Film Festival, but received negative reviews and was never distributed.
