= Emma Laird =

English actress

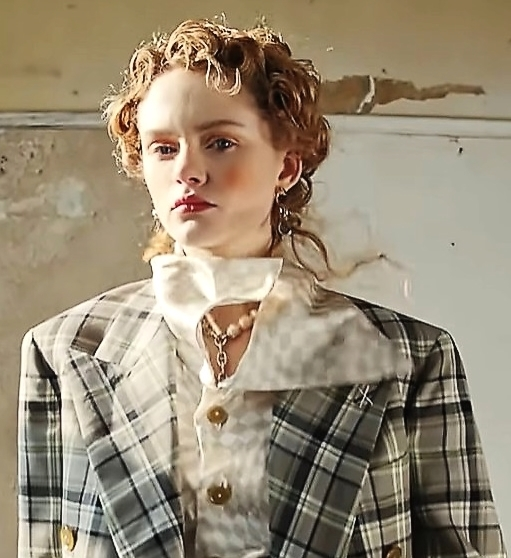
- Laird modelling for Vivienne Westwood in 2021
- Occupation: Actress
- Years active: 2014–present

Emma Laird is an English actress. On television, she is known for her role in the Paramount+ series Mayor of Kingstown (2021–2024). Her films include A Haunting in Venice (2023), The Brutalist (2024) and Satisfaction (2025). She was named a 2025 Screen International Star of Tomorrow.

== Early life ==
Laird is from Chesterfield. She attended Tupton Hall School, completing her A Levels in 2014.

== Career ==
=== Modelling ===
Scouted by Models 1 at Leeds Festival when she was 18, Laird was a model for seven years. In 2019, she became the face of Pandora for the brand's autumn campaign. Laird has spoken critically of the modelling industry, calling it "very dangerous for young girls" as she was repeatedly told to lose weight. In addition, the lack of creative freedom "bored" her. Fatigued, she enrolled in acting classes at the New York Film Academy.

=== Acting ===
In April 2021, Laird was cast in her debut television role in the Paramount+ crime thriller Mayor of Kingstown as Iris, "a dancer who uses her charms to her benefit, until those charms are used against her". The series premiered later that year. The Hollywood Reporter said Laird's handling of concurrent offers "lit up the town's buzz meter". In October 2021, Variety included Laird in their annual list of 10 Brits to Watch.

In 2023, Laird starred in the Apple TV+ series The Crowded Room and made her feature film debut in Kenneth Branagh's A Haunting in Venice. The following year, she was part of the ensemble cast of the film The Brutalist (2024). Laird appeared as cult member Jimmima in Danny Boyle's 2025 film 28 Years Later. The following year, she reprised the role in 28 Years Later: The Bone Temple, directed by Nia DaCosta.

By February 2025, Laird was cast in Terry Gilliam's upcoming comedy film Carnival: At the End of Days. In 2026, she was cast in Elden Ring, a live-action adaptation of the game of the same name, written and directed by Alex Garland. It is set for a March 2028 release.

== Filmography ==
Key
†	Denotes films that have not yet been released

=== Film ===
Year	Title	Role	Notes	Ref.
2023	A Haunting in Venice	Desdemona Holland		
2024	The Brutalist	Audrey		
2025	Satisfaction	Lola		
2025	28 Years Later	Jimmima		
2025	Fackham Hall	Poppy Davenport		
2026	28 Years Later: The Bone Temple	Jimmima		
2026	Falling			
2027	Blood on Snow †	TBA	Post-production	
2028	Elden Ring †		Post-production	
TBA	The Housekeeper †	Daphne du Maurier	Post-production	

=== Television ===
Year	Title	Role	Notes	Ref.
2021–2024	Mayor of Kingstown	Iris	Main role, 30 episodes	
2023	The Crowded Room	Annabelle	Miniseries, 5 episodes	
2026	Mint	Shannon	Miniseries, 8 episodes	
2026	War	Molly Giordano	3 episodes	
2027	Neuromancer †	Linda Lee	Upcoming series	
