= Meristem (school) =

School for autistic young adults in California

Location
- 9200 Fair Oaks Blvd; Fair Oaks, California; United States

Information
- Type: Private, non-profit school for autistic young adults
- Established: 2014
- Founder: Marc Turtletaub and Maureen Curran-Turtletaub
- Age: 18 to 26
- Website: meristem.pro

Meristem is a non-profit school for young adults with autism spectrum and other neurodevelopmental disorders in Fair Oaks, California.

== Background ==
Sacramento philanthropists, Marc Turtletaub and Maureen Curran-Turtletaub, established Meristem in 2014 on 13 "bucolic" acres near the American River, so that autistic young adults can more successfully transition into an evolving post-industrial society. The goal is for students to get jobs and live independently. The founding of Meristem was inspired by the United Kingdom's effort to widely use John Ruskin's ideas to train thousands of autism students since the mid-1980s. The Turtletaubs visited these centers, were impressed by what they saw, and "Meristem is an evolution of that". There is no equivalent training program in the U.S. The first class entered in 2015. The training is mainly aimed at instilling self-confidence, self-advocacy, and social participation, and shedding of anxieties. With no one standard treatment for autism, Meristem has chosen to have a unique model for its training program. There is a de-emphasis on classical classroom instruction, and an emphasis on experiental learning; behavioral analysis and modification are not part of the program. Inspired by John Ruskin's "craft and land" philosophy of education, it uses practical skills therapeutic education and transformative movement.

The name for the school is derived from meristem plant tissue, which contains meristemic cells. These undifferentiated cells undergo continual growth and division; when they leave the meristem they differentiate.

== Curriculum ==
Students are encouraged to work with their hands and are given the needed time to complete tasks at their own pace. This is to enable the student to acquire confidence to solve problems in the real world, learning how to overcome obstacles and embrace challenges. To learn transferable professional skills, there are three campus enterprises run by students: a B&B, Meristem bakery and Meristem health and beauty products. The core areas of the curriculum are movement, land work, craftwork, independent living skills, and preparation to work. There is hands-on learning in 10 vocational trades, including metalworking, woodworking, culinary arts and agriculture, among others.

== Employment ==
To help its graduates find employment, Meristem has worked with the state of California to produce a pilot project to teach employers on how to hire, train and retain people with autism, "this untapped and valuable group of employees." Also, part of the Meristem curriculum includes placing students in paid jobs, internships or volunteer positions at local businesses.
