= White Fang (2018 film) =

- Film poster
- French: Croc-Blanc
- Directed by: Alexandre Espigares
- Screenplay by: Philippe Lioret; Serge Frydman; Dominique Monféry
- Based on: White Fang by Jack London
- Produced by: Marc Turtletaub; Peter Saraf; Lilian Eche; Jérémie Fajner; Christel Henon; Clément Calvet
- Edited by: Patrick Ducruet
- Music by: Bruno Coulais
- Production companies: Superprod Animation; Bidibul Productions; Big Beach
- Distributed by: Netflix
- Release dates: 21 January 2018 (Sundance); 28 March 2018 (France); 6 July 2018 (Netflix)
- Running time: 85 minutes
- Countries: France; Luxembourg
- Languages: English; French
- Box office: $7.8 million

White Fang (French: Croc-Blanc) is a 2018 animated film directed by Alexandre Espigares. Based on the 1906 book White Fang by Jack London, the film features the voices of Nick Offerman, Rashida Jones, Paul Giamatti, and Eddie Spears as natives of Alaska who, at different times, come to know White Fang, a free spirited and at times violent wolfdog who eventually bonds with Offerman's character, a gentle master named Weedon Scott. The film also features Dave Boat, Daniel Hagen, and Stephen Kramer Glickman in the original English version, and Virginie Efira, Raphaël Personnaz, and Dominique Pinon in the French dub.

The film premiered at Sundance Film Festival in January 2018. After a limited theatrical run in France and the United States, Netflix acquired the film and released it later that year, on 6 July 2018. The film received positive reviews from critics and audiences. During its theatrical run, White Fang grossed $7.8 million worldwide.

== Plot ==
White Fang, a wolfdog, is mauled during a dog fight. Town marshal Weedon Scott tries to interfere, but White Fang's owner, Beauty Smith, sneaks behind him and knocks him out with his cane. When the police search for Smith, they can't find him.

In a flashback, White Fang lives with his mother, another wolfdog. While searching for a shelter, they get attacked by a lynx. White Fang's mother successfully kills the predator, but not without injury. While Scott camps for the night after escaping a pack of wolves with Hank, another Marshall, and Jim Hall, a criminal being transported to prison, White Fang and his mother head to their campground to search for food. Hank notices the pair and attempts to shoot White Fang's mother to put her down due to her injured leg. Scott stops Hank from killing White Fang's mother and instead gives White Fang a piece of salmon, saying that he might be able to return the favour in the future. White Fang and Kiche then end up encountering the pack of wolves Weedon encountered. Kiche then throws the salmon towards the pack to distract them, giving her and White Fang a chance to escape.

While searching for food the following morning, White Fang and his mother come across an Indigenous camp. When a man named Three Eagles attempts to kill White Fang's mother, Grey Beaver, another man recognizes her as Kiche, his old sled dog. Three Eagles leaves Kiche to Grey Beaver, who decides to train her to become a sled dog again. Later, Hank comes to the camp area to tell the Indigenous people that their land is currently on sale due to a recent gold strike, and Grey Beaver resolves to buy back the land by selling beaver pelt mittens in Fort Yukon.

When Grey Beaver realises that there are no beavers on his side of the land, he decides to give Kiche to a man named William in exchange for trapping beavers on William's side. After selling the amount of mittens he needs to buy back the land, Grey Beaver travels to Fort Yukon with White Fang, where they run into Smith. Smith attempts to buy White Fang to make him a fighting dog, an offer that Grey Beaver declines. Smith and his henchman Curtis then force Grey Beaver to sell White Fang after stealing his money the night before. Smith and Curtis then take White Fang to participate in dog fights, where he wins all his matches. He eventually fights against two dogs and passes out after getting mauled by them in the ring.

White Fang awakens near a cabin, where an injured Weedon and his wife, Maggie live. The next morning, Weedon and Maggie find out that White Fang went through a hole in their chicken coop, killing a few of the birds. Maggie then blocks the hole and leaves White Fang in after telling him that he can’t kill the chickens. She then goes back to Weedon to tell him that she is pregnant and they agree to go back to San Francisco. After that, they check on White Fang, who is calmly resting with the chickens in the coop.

After White Fang is taken back from Smith and Curtis by Scott and Maggie, Smith enlists the help of Hall, who recently escaped prison, to attack the couple. While White Fang and Scott are hiking, Hall attacks them. White Fang manages to fight him off with Scott and the two rush home to see that Maggie is being held at knifepoint by Curtis and Smith. Smith attempts to hit Scott with his cane when White Fang intercepts him, snatching the cane away from him and snapping it with his jaws. After a tiring fight and chase, Curtis, Smith, and Hall are escorted to prison by Hank.

Exhausted and satisfied with their new life, Scott and Maggie head to San Francisco with White Fang. However, Scott decides to set him free in the wild after he sees White Fang sadly looking back at the woods. White Fang then runs away as fast as he can into the woods until he reaches a cliff. He then howls so loudly that Grey Beaver, Kiche and William can hear his cry. After howling, he then rushes back into the woods.

== Voice cast ==
- Nick Offerman as Marshal Weedon Scott
- Rashida Jones as Maggie Scott
- Paul Giamatti as Beauty Smith
- Eddie Spears as Grey Beaver
- Dave Boat as Jim Hall
- Sean Kenin as Bookie
- Raquel Antonia as Vichi
- Daniel Hagen as Marshal Todd
- Stephen Kramer Glickman as Ned
- William Calvert as William
- Jason Grasl as Three Eagles
- Armando Riesco as Curtis

== Reception ==
The film received mostly positive reviews from critics and audiences. On the review aggregator website Rotten Tomatoes, 80% of 10 critics' reviews are positive, with an average rating of 6.5/10. Metacritic, which uses a weighted average, assigned the film a score of 61 out of 100, based on 5 critics, indicating "generally favorable" reviews.

Guy Lodge of Variety called it a "a visually marvelous, dramatically uneven spin" on the source material, writing that, "close canine sympathy is one thing this kind-hearted, beautifully conceived but, well, slightly toothless White Fang gets right throughout." Lodge criticized the film's pacing, voice acting, and lack of personality, but praised its animation and artistic style, and felt that it was an enjoyable movie for its target demographic of young children. Kate Erbland of IndieWire gave the film a B grade, wrote that it "offers up warm-hearted charms and often stunning animation", praising its animation and message.

=== Awards and accolades ===
Year	Award	Category	Result	Ref.
2016	Annecy International Animated Film Festival	Gan Foundation Award for Distribution	Won	
2018	European Film Awards	European Animated Feature Film	Nominated	
2018	Hamburg Film Festival	Michel Award	Nominated	
2018	Hollywood Music in Media Awards	Best Original Score - Animated Film	Nominated	
2018	Shanghai International Film Festival	21st Golden Goblet Awards	Nominated	
