= Yasnaya Polyana =

Museum in Russia

Coordinates: 54°04′34″N 37°31′34″E

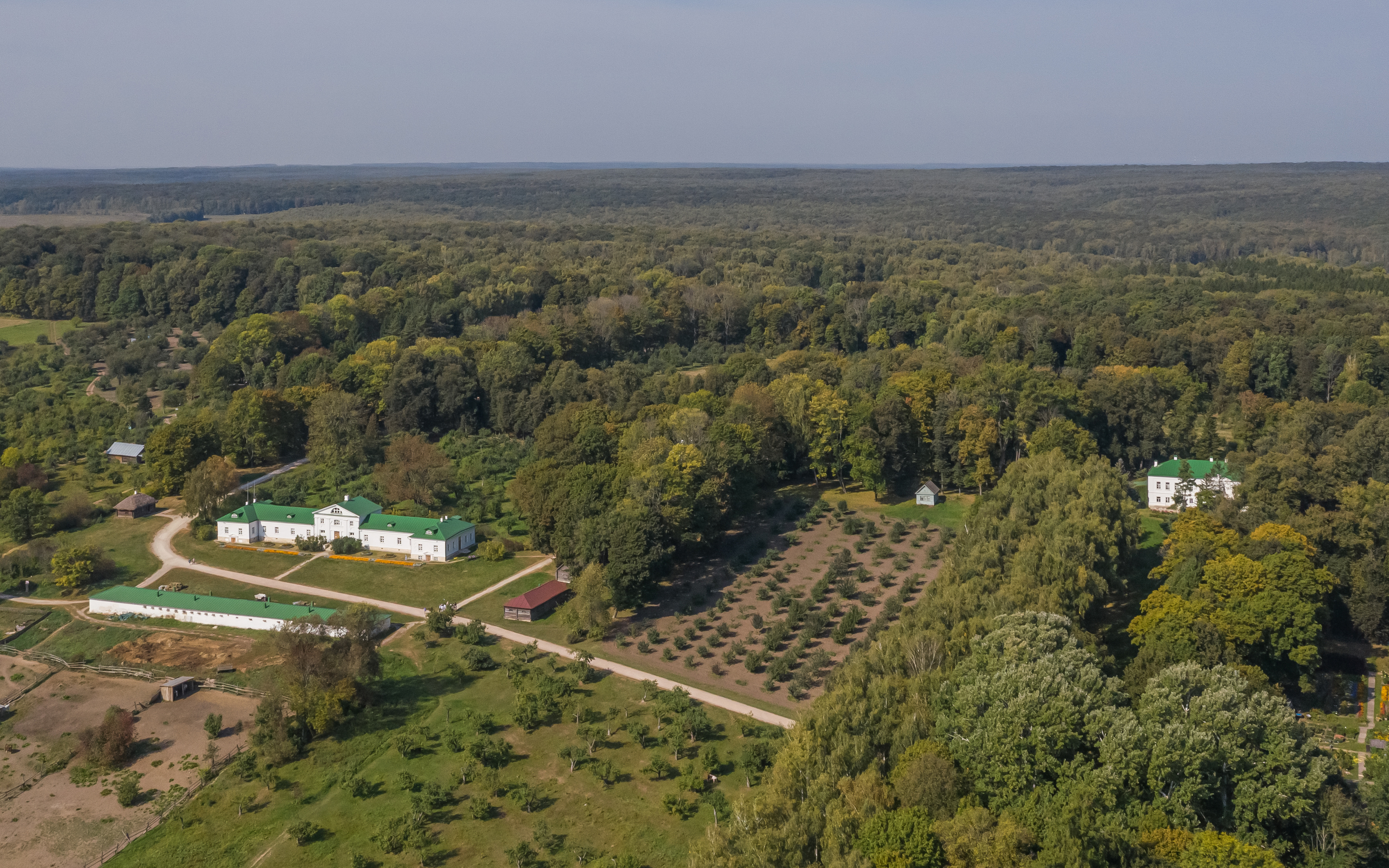
The estate of Yasnaya Polyana

Yasnaya Polyana (Russian: Я́сная Поля́на, IPA: [ˈjasnəjə pɐˈlʲanə], lit. 'Bright Glade') is a writer's house museum, the former home of the writer Leo Tolstoy. It is 12 kilometres (7.5 mi) southwest of Tula, Russia, and 200 kilometres (120 mi) from Moscow.

Tolstoy was born in this house, where he wrote both War and Peace and Anna Karenina. He is buried in the grounds of the house. Tolstoy called Yasnaya Polyana his "inaccessible literary stronghold". In June 1921, the estate was nationalized and formally became the State Memorial and Nature Reserve "Museum-Estate of L. N. Tolstoy — 'Yasnaya Polyana'" (Ясная Поляна).

It was at first run by Alexandra Tolstaya, the writer's daughter. As of 2023, the director of the museum was Ekaterina Tolstaya, the wife of Tolstoy's great-great-grandson (and former museum director, 1994–2012) Vladimir Tolstoy. The museum contains Tolstoy's personal effects and movables, as well as his library of 22,000 volumes. The estate-museum contains the writer's mansion, the school he founded for peasant children, and a park where Tolstoy's unadorned grave is situated.

== History ==
=== Early history ===
The estate of Yasnaya Polyana was originally owned by the Kartsev family. In the 18th century, it was purchased by major-general Prince Sergey Volkonskiy and then passed to his son, general-in-chief Prince Nikolai Volkonskiy, the grandfather of the writer. Nikolai lived in what is now known as the 'Volkonskiy house' before commencing to build the main, single-storey manor house in 1810, at the highest point of the estate. This was flanked by two two-storey wings, linked by decking. He also built stables, a coach-house, a bathhouse, summerhouse, and two orangeries linked by a gallery, and created a formal French garden, an English landscape garden with a cascade of ponds, and long avenues of birch and oak trees.

The house passed from Nikolai Volkonskiy to his only daughter, Princess Maria Nikolayevna Volkonskaya, the mother of Count Leo Tolstoy. Her husband, Count Nikolai Ilyich Tolstoy, a veteran of the war against Napoleon in 1812, added a second storey to the house, providing accommodation for an extended family of thirteen.

=== Leo Tolstoy at Yasnaya Polyana ===
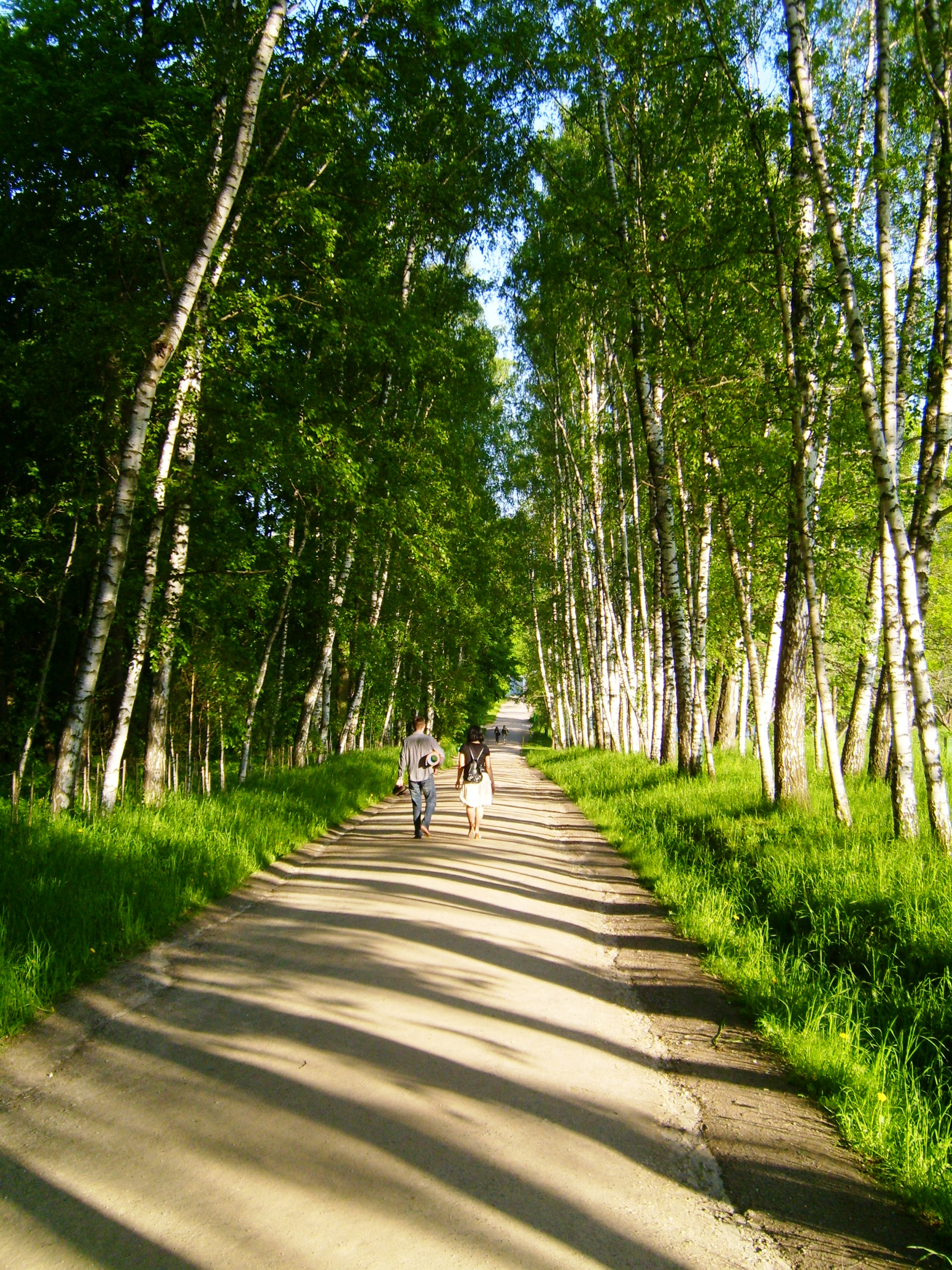
An avenue of birch trees leads from the gate at Yasnaya Polyana to Tolstoy's house.

Leo Tolstoy was born on 9 September 1828, at Yasnaya Polyana. His parents died when he was very young, and he was raised there by relatives. In 1854, to pay off gambling debts, Tolstoy sold the central part of the house to a neighbour, who dismantled it and rebuilt it on his own land. Only the two wings remained; Tolstoy occupied one while the other became dilapidated. He brought his wife there after their marriage in 1862.

At the time Tolstoy lived there, the Yasnaya Polyana estate comprised about 1,600 hectares (4,000 acres), on a gently sloping hillside with dense original forest (The Forest of the Old Order) at the upper end, and a series of four ponds at different levels. The estate had four clusters of peasant houses for about 350 peasants living and working on the estate.

Tolstoy wrote War and Peace at Yasnaya Polyana between 1862 and 1869, and wrote Anna Karenina there between 1873 and 1877. He wrote the novels in his study by hand in very small handwriting, with many additions and deletions and notes, and gave the draft to his wife, who made a clean copy at night, which Tolstoy then rewrote the next day. Each chapter went through five or six drafts, and she recopied War and Peace seven times before it was finished. All the drafts were saved by his wife and are now in the Rumyantsev Museum in Moscow.

Tolstoy's thirteen children, of whom four died in childhood, were all born at Yasnaya Polyana. They were born on the same leather sofa where Tolstoy himself was born, which was kept in his study next to his writing desk, and is still there today.

When he was living and working at Yasnaya Polyana, Tolstoy awakened at 7:00 am, did physical exercises, and walked in the park, before starting his writing. During the harvest season he often worked in the fields with the peasants, both for physical exercise and to make his writing about peasant life more realistic. He also visited the school for peasant children which he had created in one building, where he told stories to the children.

Tolstoy entertained almost all the important Russian cultural and artistic figures of his time at Yasnaya Polyana. His guests are known to have included Anton Chekhov, Ivan Turgenev, Maxim Gorky, the painters Valentin Serov, and Ilya Repin.

=== After Tolstoy's death ===
In 1911, Tolstoy's widow Sofia Alexandrovna applied to Tsar Nicholas II to have Yasnaya Polyana made into a state museum. The Tsar refused, but did grant a pension to the family which allowed the house and estate to be preserved as they were.

In 1919, the Soviet Government formally put Yasnaya Polyana under the protection of the state, and in June 1921 Yasnaya Polyana was nationalized and became a state museum, receiving 3,147 visitors in its first year.

In October 1941, as the Germans approached Moscow, 110 crates filled with the exhibits of the museum were evacuated to Moscow, and then to Tomsk. The estate was occupied by the Germans for 45 days, who turned the Leo Tolstoy House into a hospital, and German soldiers who died in the hospital were buried around Tolstoy's grave. A fire during the occupation damaged the upper floor of the house. Following the war the estate was restored to the way it looked when Count Tolstoy lived there. Soviet propaganda made use of the Germans' disregard of the house's cultural value in the 1942 war documentary film Moscow Strikes Back.

== Structures ==
Houses of Yasnaya Polyana
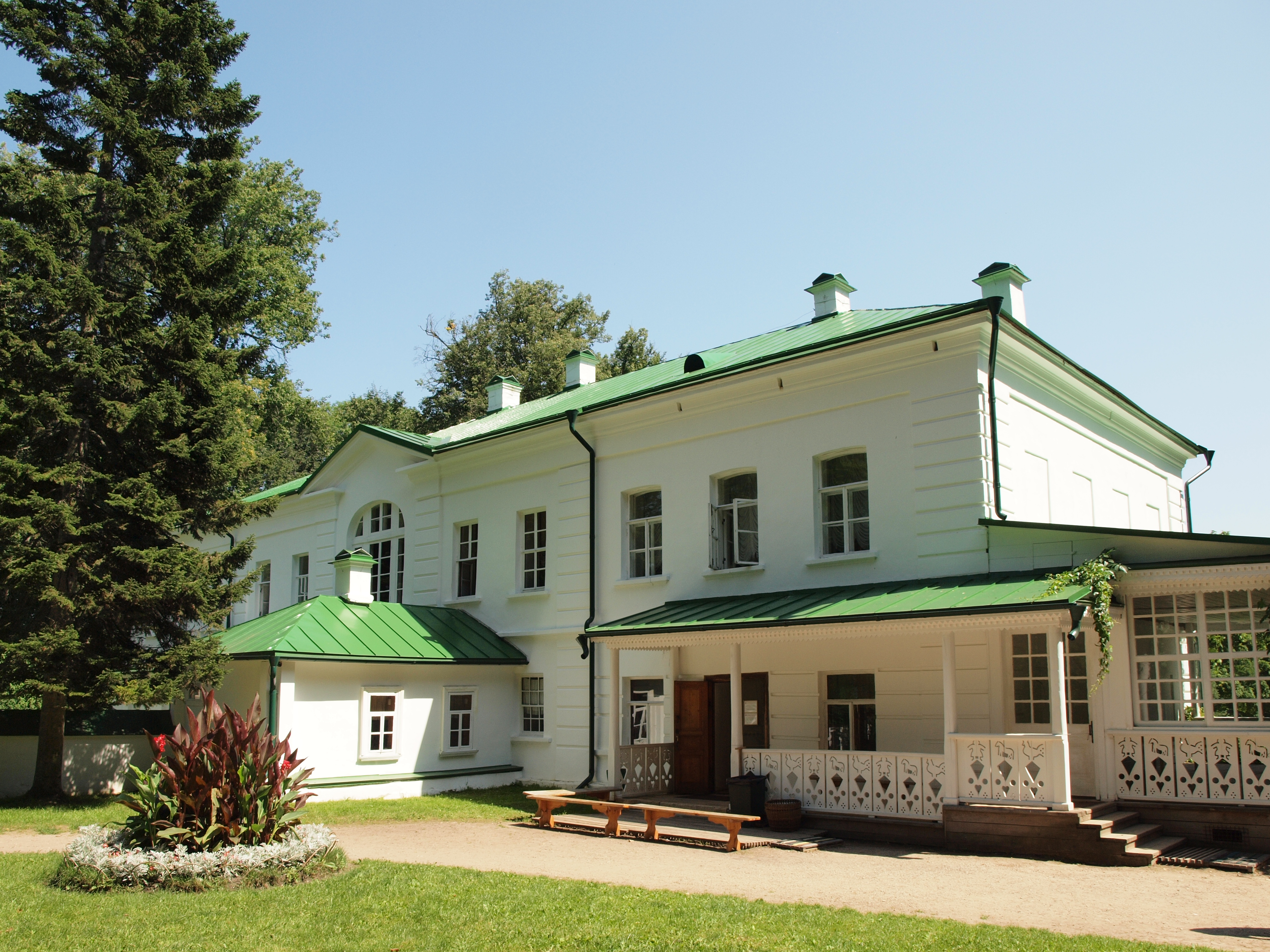
Tolstoy House

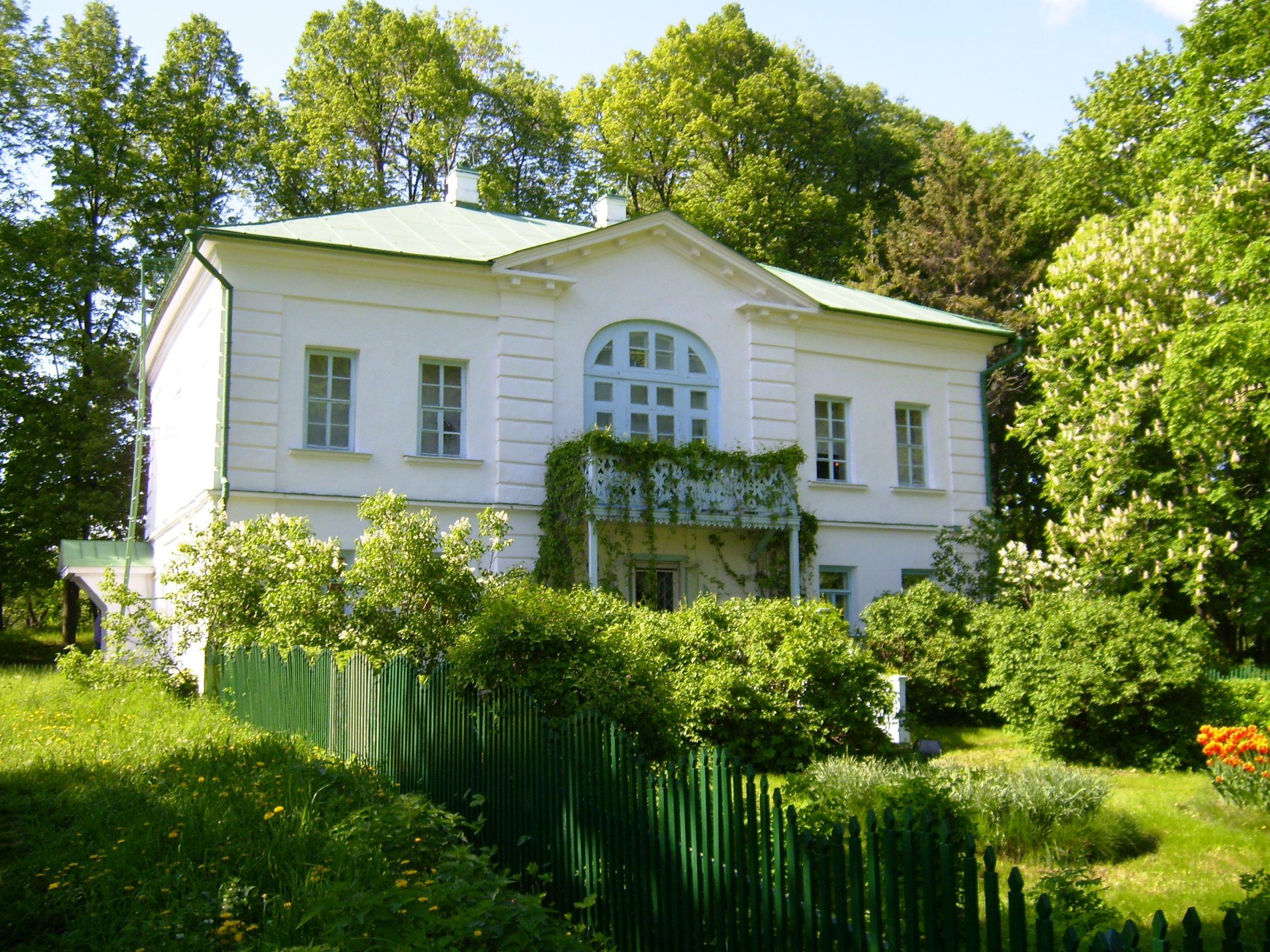
Kuzminsky House

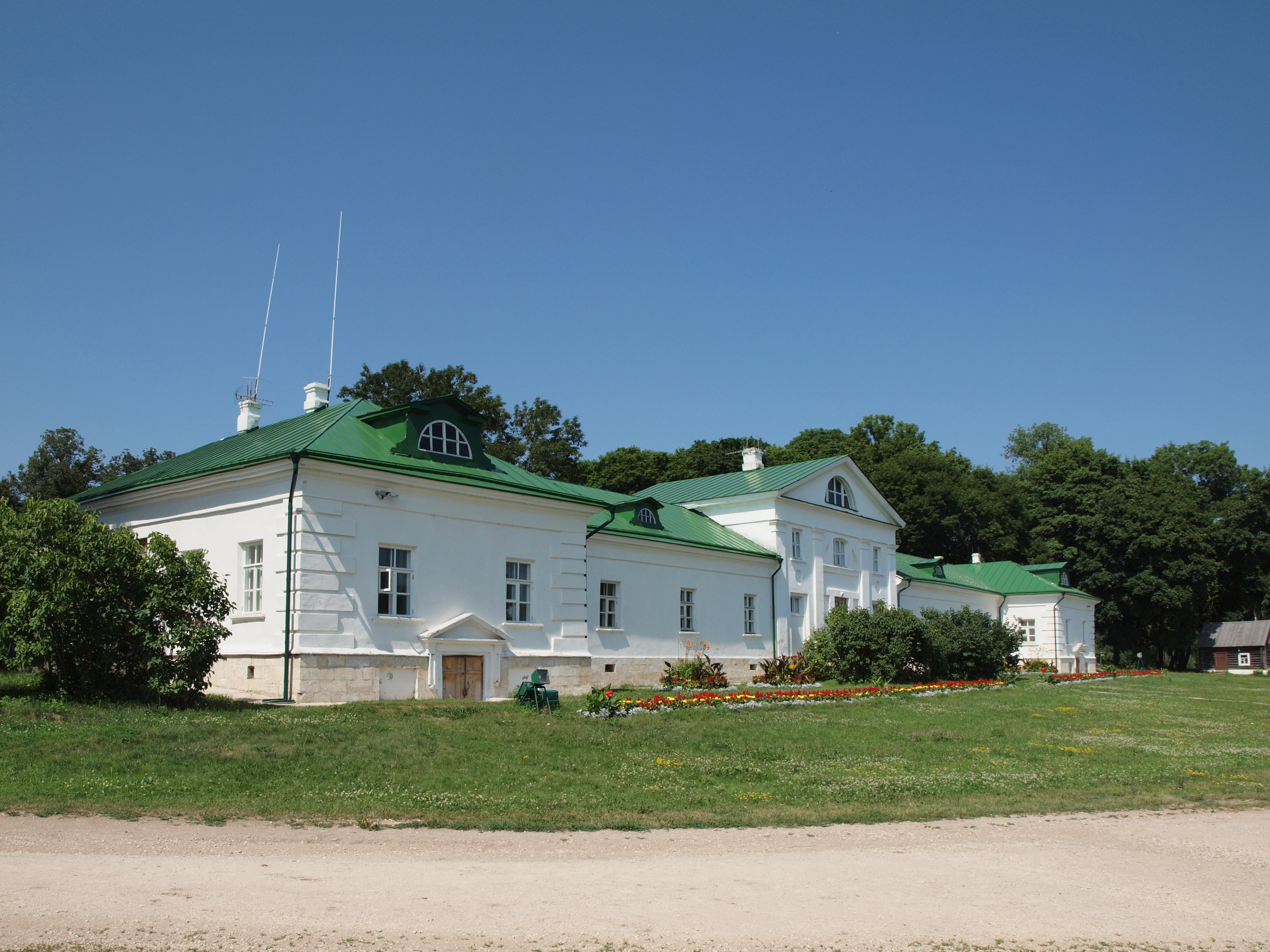
Volkonsky House

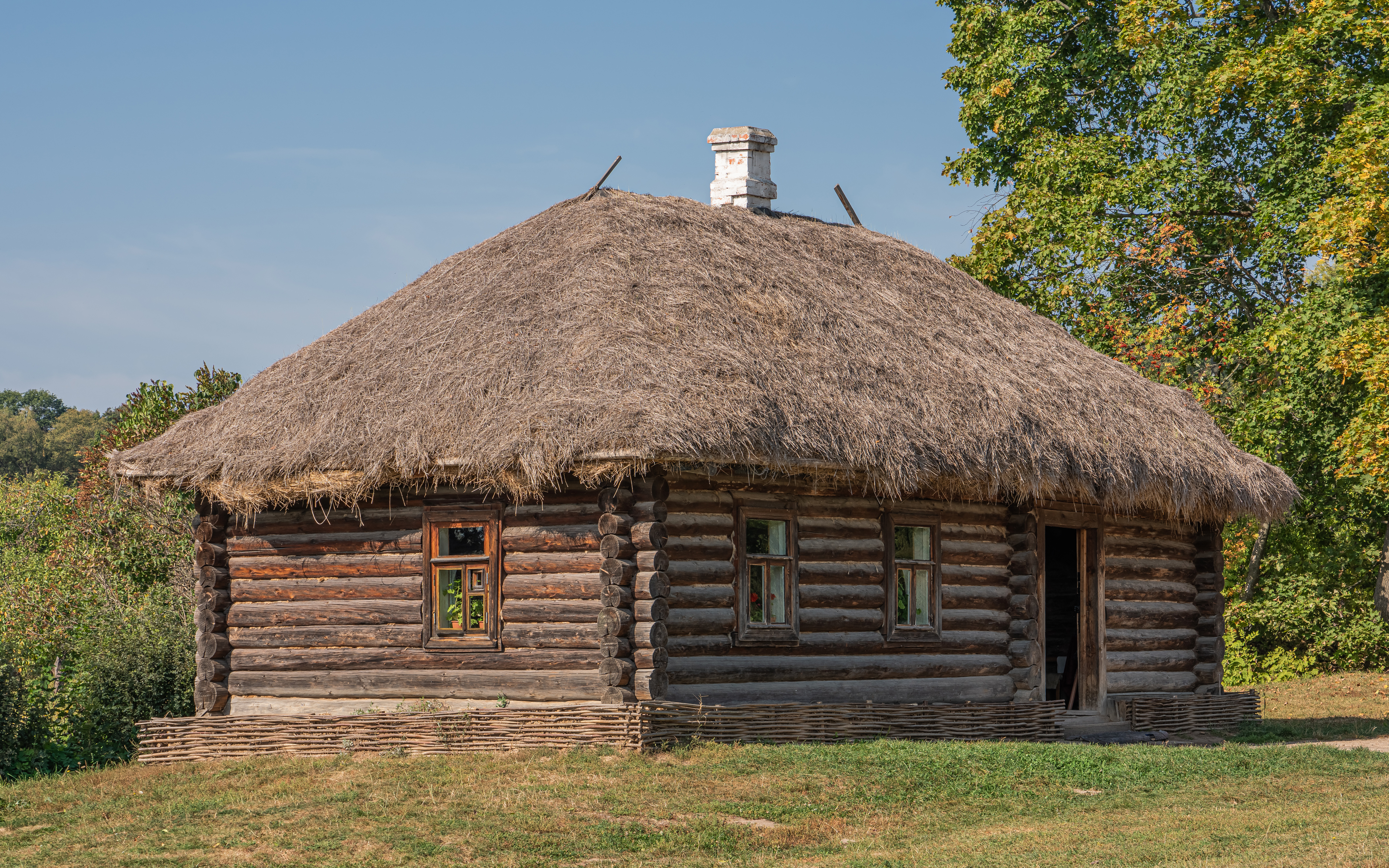
Coachman's hut

=== The Kuzminskiy wing ===
The Kuzminsky wing, like the house of Leo Tolstoy, was originally part of the large house built by Tolstoy's father, and later demolished. In 1859 Tolstoy turned it into a school for the peasant children of his estate, where he practised his theories of education. After 1862, it became the home of the younger sister of his wife, Tatyana Andreyevna Kuzminskiy, and her family. By 1897 it had become dilapidated.

=== The Volkonskiy house ===
The Volkonskiy house (not to be confused with the Volkonsky House in Moscow) is the oldest structure on the estate. It was used as a carpet factory at one time. During Tolstoy's time it housed the estate's servants.

=== Grave of Leo Tolstoy ===
Long before he died Tolstoy announced the place where he wanted to be buried: in a small clearing called "the place of the green wand", next to a long ravine in a part of the old forest called the Forest of the Old Order (Старый Заказ, Stariy Zakaz) because cutting trees there had been forbidden since the time of his grandfather, and many trees there were over a hundred years old. The name 'place of the green wand' had been given by Tolstoy's older brother Nikolai, who said that the person who found the magic wand there would never die or be ill. He and his brother frequently sat in the darkness in the clearing and talked.

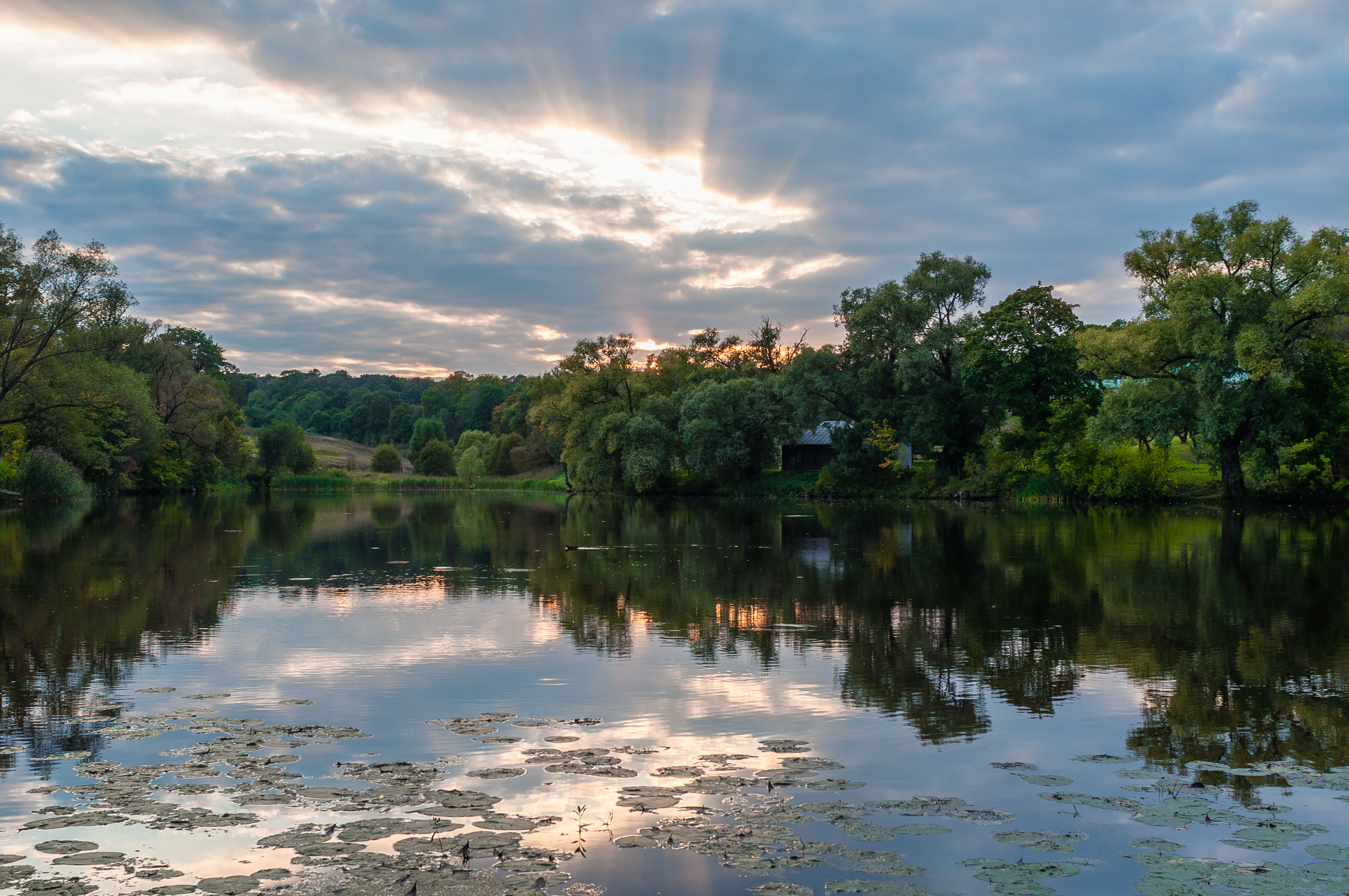
Big pond

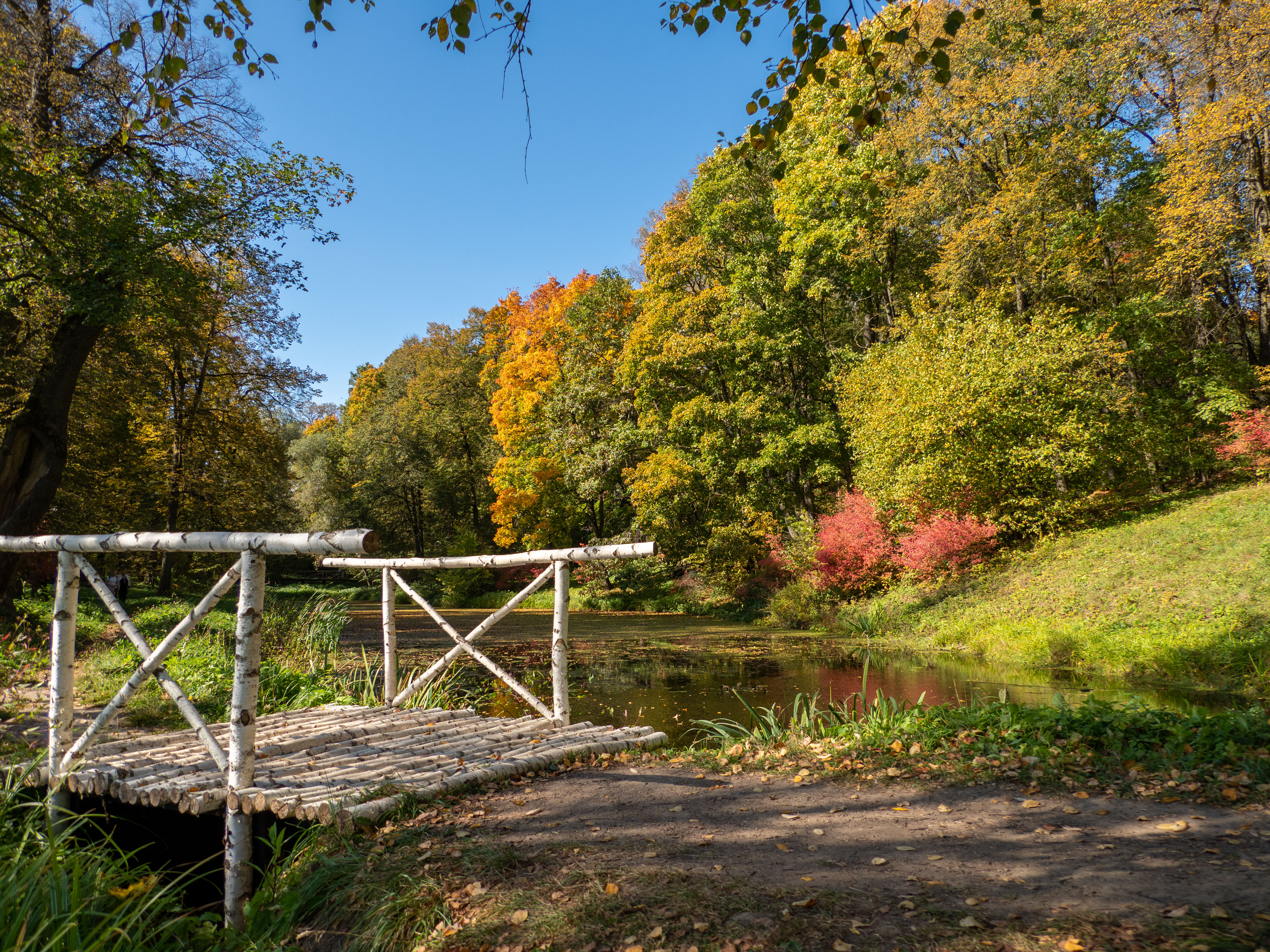
Small pond

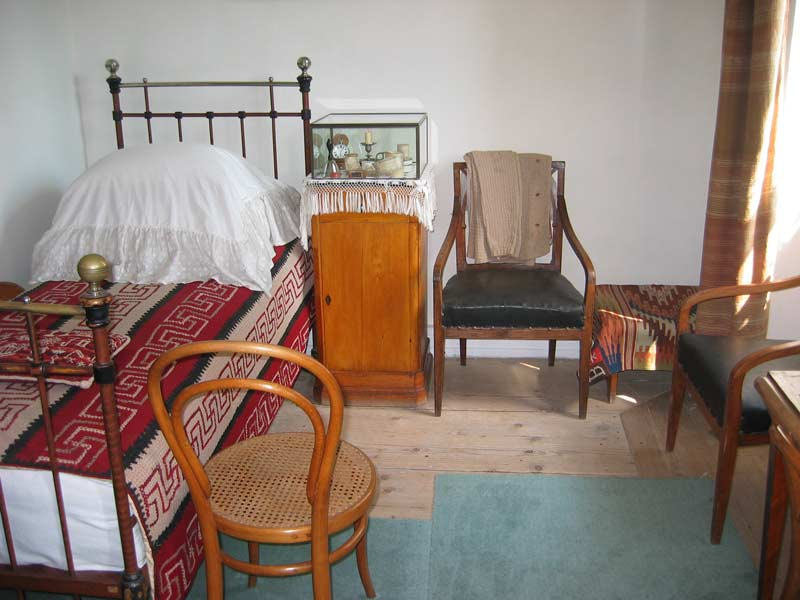
Tolstoy's simple bedroom, as it was when he left the house for the last time in 1910.

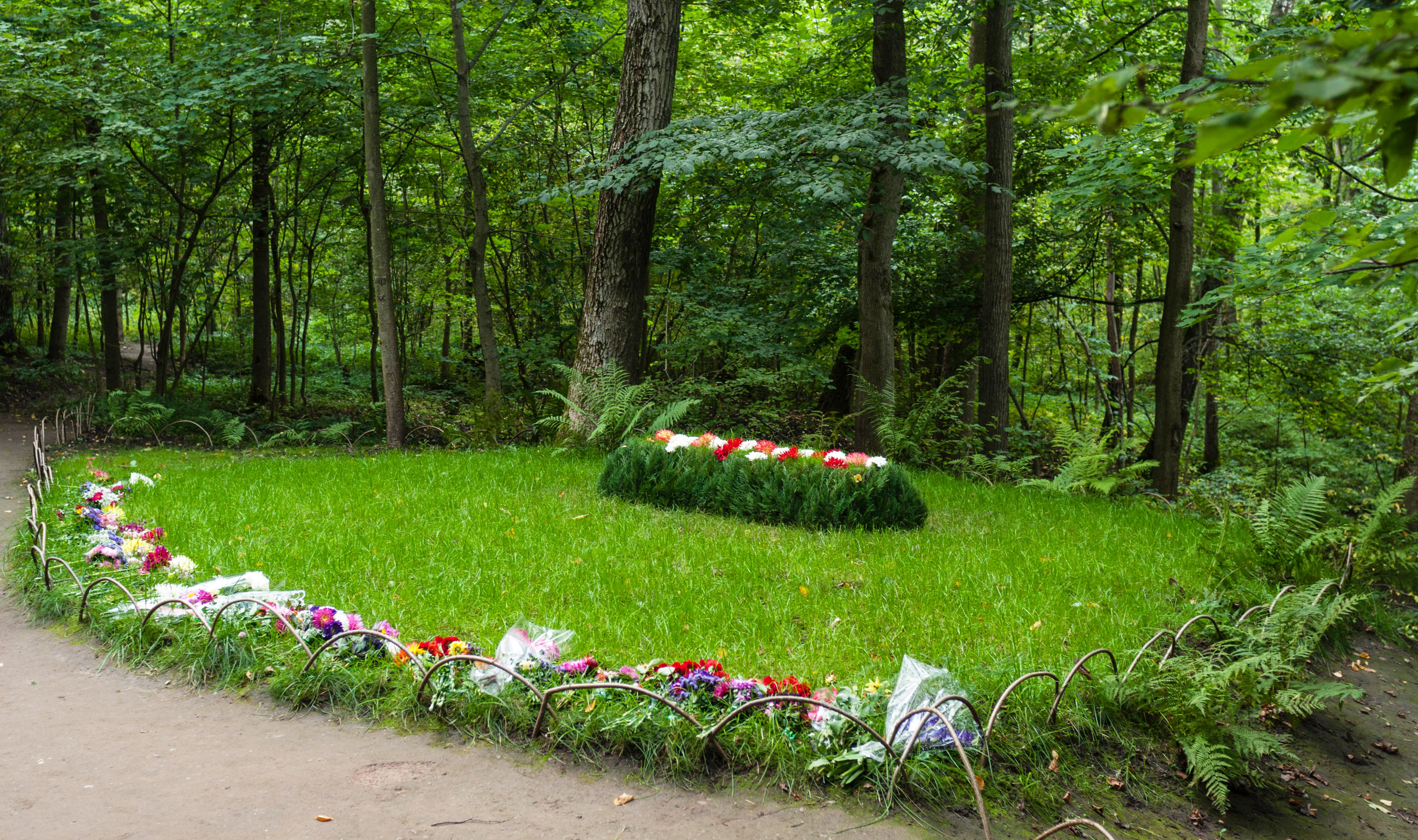
Tolstoy's Tomb

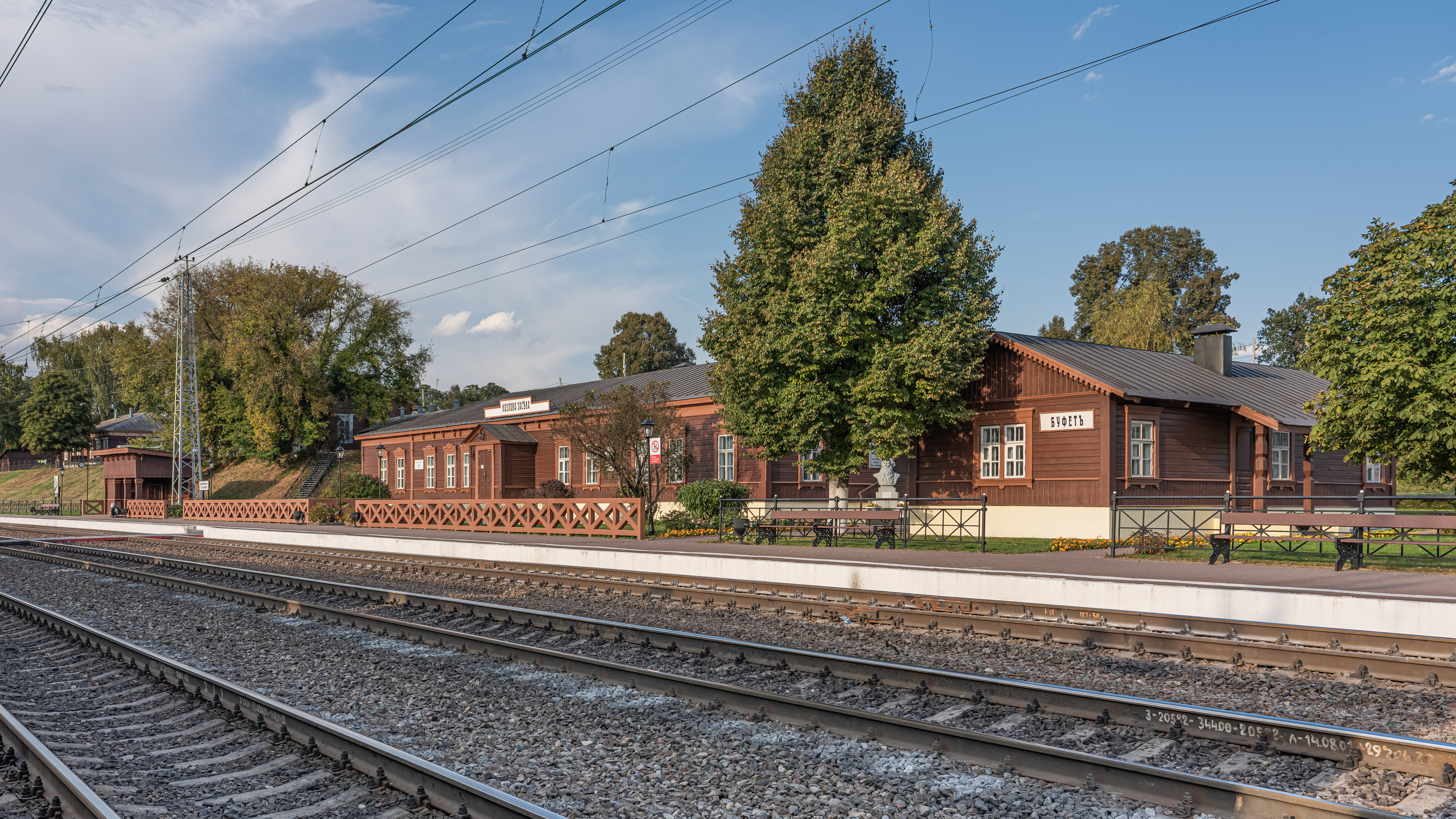
Yasnaya Polyana Train Station

== In fiction ==
The Bald Hills estate in War and Peace, owned by Prince Bolkonsky and later by Nikolai Rostov, is modelled on Yasnaya Polyana. Yasnaya Polyana is one of four major cities in the Erangel map in the video game PlayerUnknown's Battlegrounds. It also features in the 1990 Jay Parini novel The Last Station, and in the 2009 film version.

Steven Conte's novel The Tolstoy Estate is set on the estate during the German Occupation in World War 2 when it was used as a hospital.

== See also ==
- Volkonsky House

== Cited sources ==
- Bartlett, Rosamund (2011). Tolstoy: A Russian Life. Profile. ISBN 978-0151014385.
- Massie, Suzanne (1980). Land of the Firebird, the Beauty of Old Russia. New York: Simon and Schuster. ISBN 096441841X.
- Wright, Charles Theodore Hagberg (1911). "Tolstoy, Leo" . Encyclopædia Britannica. Vol. 26 (11th ed.). pp. 1053–1061.
