= Valentin Bulgakov =

Russian memoirist and biographer

- Валентин Фёдорович Булгаков
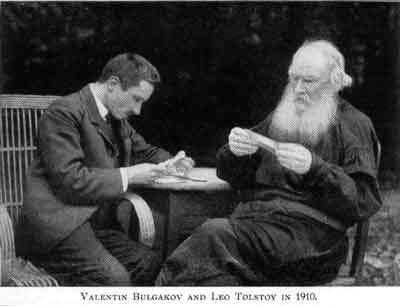
- Bulgakov, and Leo Tolstoy in 1910
- Born: 25 November 1886; Kuznetsk, Tomsk Governorate, Russian Empire
- Died: 22 September 1966 (aged 79); Yasnaya Polyana, Tula Oblast, Soviet Union
- Education: Imperial Moscow University (1910)
- Writing career
- Years active: 1910–1966
- Genres: Writer of memoirs, biography

Valentin Fyodorovich Bulgakov (Russian: Валентин Фёдорович Булгаков; 25 November 1886 – 22 September 1966) was the last secretary of Leo Tolstoy, and his biographer. He served as the director of several literary museums and actively participated in Tolstoyan and pacifist initiatives. He endured imprisonment under the Tsarist regime and internment in a Nazi concentration camp. For the last 20 years of his life, he assumed the role of the head at the Yasnaya Polyana museum.

== Biography ==
=== Early years ===
Valentin Bulgakov was the son of an official of the city of Kuznetsk (now Novokuznetsk). He received his early education at the Tomsk grammar school.

At an early age, Valentin Bulgakov became a regular correspondent for a local newspaper. In 1904, a supplement to "Siberian Life" published his best-known early article "F. Dostoevsky in the Kuznetsk". The article contained new material on the wedding of Fyodor Dostoyevsky with Maria Dmitrievna Isayeva held in Kuznetsk in 1857.

In 1906 he finished high school with honors.

=== Secretary to Leo Tolstoy ===
Bulgakov became a student of history and philology of Moscow University (1906–1910). In 1907, Bulgakov became acquainted with Leo Tolstoy. He became a sincere follower of Tolstoyanism and its life principles such as pacifism, vegetarianism, non-participation in political activities and a high level of social activity based on Christian principles.

In 1910 he dropped out of university and became the personal secretary of Leo Tolstoy. He was a personal witness to the lives of the Tolstoy family at Yasnaya Polyana during the last period of the writer's life. On 28 October 1910, he managed to prevent a suicide attempt of Tolstoy's wife Sophia Tolstaya following the departure of Tolstoy.

During this period he became gradually estranged from Vladimir Chertkov, one of the most prominent Tolstoyans.

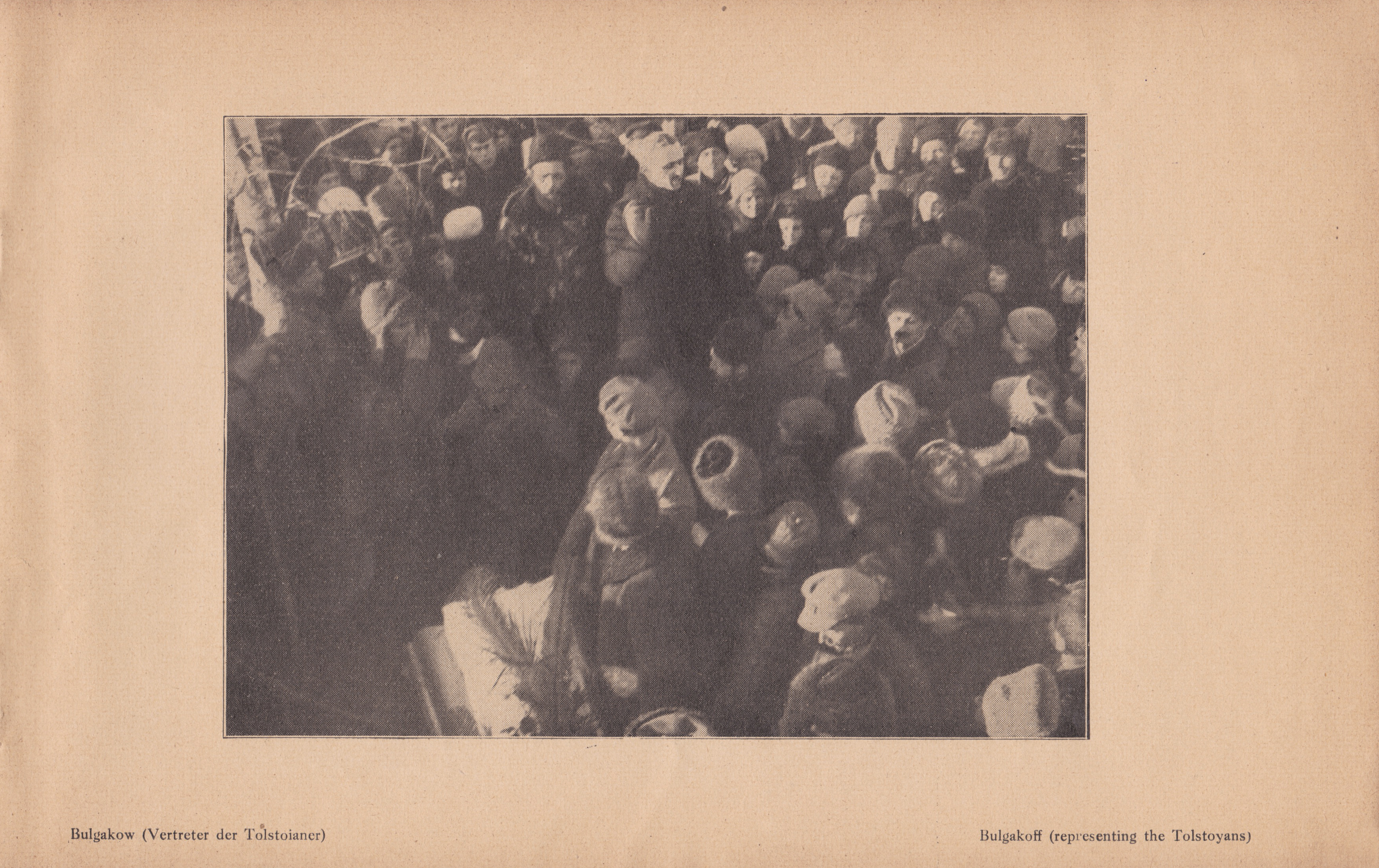
Bulgakov (representing the Tolstoyans), delivering a eulogy at the funerals of anarchist Peter Kropotkin (collections of L'Éphéméride anarchiste)

After the death of Leo Tolstoy, Bulgakov remained for several years in Yasnaya Polyana and worked on his notes which were published in 1911 under the title "The last year of Leo Tolstoy" and "The conception of life by Leo Tolstoy in his letters to his secretary". Both books were soon translated into several languages. He began the laborious task of describing the library of Tolstoy. He took an active part in publishing the works of Leo Tolstoy and the organization of the Tolstoy Museum in Moscow. In 1917 he published "Christian ethics", an authoritative account of the religious and ethical teaching of Tolstoy.

=== World War I ===
The first reaction of the Tolstoyan Movement to the outbreak of World War I was the appeal "Wake up, all people are brothers!" composed by Bulgakov on 28 September 1914.

Our enemies are—not the Germans, and - not Russians or Frenchmen. The common enemy of us all, no matter what nationality to which we belong—is the beast within us. Nowhere is this truth so clearly confirmed, as now, when, intoxicated, and excessively proud of their false science, their foreign culture and their civilization of the machine, people of the 20th century have suddenly realized the true stage of its development: this step is no higher than that which our ancestors were at in the days of Attila and Genghis Khan. It is infinitely sad to know that two thousand years of Christianity have passed almost without a trace upon the people.

In October, Bulgakov continued circulating the appeal, collecting signatures and posting copies which were confiscated by the Okhrana. On 28 October Bulgakov was arrested together with 27 signatories of the appeal.

In November–December 1915, most defendants were released from custody on bail. A trial took place on 1 April 1916 and the defendants were acquitted. Pavel Ivanovich Biryukov received in 1914 the text of the appeal and subsequently published it in the Swiss magazine Demain ("Tomorrow"), edited by Henri Guilbaud.

=== Museum ===
In 1916, Bulgakov took the position of keeper of the Museum of Leo Tolstoy in Moscow (the first keeper, Pavel Ivanovich Biryukov, had left for Switzerland).

After the October Revolution, many Tolstoyans opposed dialogue with the Bolsheviks and were opposed to the nationalization of the Tolstoy Museum. Bulgakov and A. Thick insisted, however, on coming to an agreement with the Soviet government. Later Bulgakov, Tolstoy and the artist ND Bartram, founder of the Museum of Toys, were able to secure against numerous applicants a mansion in 11 Prechistenka, Moscow which became the location for the Tolstoy museum. Bulgakov also put great efforts into creating a "steel room" for the Archives of Tolstoy.

On 5 April 1920, Lenin signed a decree for the nationalization of the House of Leo Tolstoy in Moscow. The Literary Museum in Prechistenka and the Museum-Estate "Khamovniki" were combined into a single museum with Bulgakov as its director. Bulgakov retained this position until his expulsion by the Soviet regime in 1923.

=== Pomgol ===
As a result of the Russian Civil War, alleged crop failure and the first implementation of war communism (which involved the violent seizure by the government of food from peasants) the country experienced a famine in 1921. There were tens of thousands of starving peasants and many cases of cannibalism.

On 21 July 1921 a preliminary meeting of the All-Union Public Committee for the Relief of Starving (Pomgol Public Committee, Всероссийский общественный комитет помощи голодающим) was held and a decree was signed by the Central Executive Committee of the Soviet Union on the establishment of the committee, as well as its role. The committee was given the sign of the Red Cross. The Committee initially included 63 people, including, Bulgakov, famous cultural figures, economist Alexander Chayanov, the president of the Academy of Sciences Alexander Petrovich Karpinsky and representatives of Russian religious denominations.

Negotiations for help began with overseas organizations, including the American Relief Administration and polar explorer Fridtjof Nansen, the head of the executive committee of "International Aid to Russia." The negotiations culminated in agreements on the supply of food.

After six weeks the Soviet Politburo passed a resolution for the elimination of the committee. Most of its members, including Bulgakov, were arrested. Simultaneously, the press began attacking them. However, experienced in confronting the authorities Bulgakov made sure that on 18 September 1921 the newspaper "Communist Labor" ran a refutation of the false accusations and published an excerpt from his letter to the editor. Along with the majority of the members of Pomgol, Bulgakov was released and then exiled from the Soviet Union in February 1923.

=== Emigration ===
He went into exile in Prague, Czechoslovakia. He conducted extensive lecturing activities in Europe in which he promoted creativity, Tolstoyism and the non-violent struggle against British colonialism, led by Mahatma Gandhi.

He joined the international anti-war organization "War Resisters' International," and soon became one of the members of its board. In 1932 he initiated that the community of Doukhobor, which at the end of the 19th century had emigrated from Russia to Canada, was accepted by the organization.

In the period from 1924 to 1928 he was the chairman of the Union of Russian Writers and Journalists in Czechoslovakia. He supported Marina Tsvetaeva during her exile in Prague.

He corresponded with prominent cultural and intellectual figures such as Romain Rolland, Rabindranath Tagore, Albert Einstein and Nicholas Roerich.

In 1934, Bulgakov founded the Russian cultural-historical museum near the Prague Castle. The museum gathered a rich collection of Russian art, that had been scattered in many countries around the world including paintings, antiquities, manuscripts and books. He was one of the editors of the Union of Russian Writers' book "The Ark". With A. Yupatovym he prepared the handbook "Russian art abroad" (1938, Prague). In the 1930s, he prepared a fundamental Glossary of Russian émigré writers (which was not published during the author's lifetime).

When at the beginning of the Second World War the German Wehrmacht marched into Prague, Bulgakov was arrested on suspicion of being a communist and later sent to an internment camp in Weißenburg in Bayern (Bavaria) called "ILAG XIII Wülzburg". During his incarceration at the camp from 1941 to 1945 he wrote his memoirs of Tolstoy and his family.

=== Back in the USSR ===
In 1948, Bulgakov applied for Soviet citizenship and returned to the USSR. He settled in Yasnaya Polyana, where for almost 20 years he was the keeper of the house-museum of Leo Tolstoy. In 1958 he was admitted to the Union of Soviet Writers. He wrote a series of essays in the book "Meetings with Artists," "On Tolstoy. Memories and Stories", and a still unpublished memoir, "How Life is Lived."

Valentin Bulgakov died in Yasnaya Polyana at the age of 80. He was buried in the village of Kochaki near the family burial of Tolstoys.

== Legacy ==
In addition to the memoirs of Tolstoy, promotional pamphlets and essays on Tolstoyism, Bulgakov left a large correspondence, especially from the time of his Prague emigration, with, amongst others, Romain Rolland, Rabindranath Tagore, Albert Einstein and Nicholas Roerich.

His personal archive is stored in the Russian State Archive of Literature and Art and the Literary Archives of the National Museum of Prague.

== In popular culture ==
Valentin Bulgakov is one of the main characters (played by James McAvoy) in The Last Station (2009), a film about the last year in the life of Tolstoy. The film was based on a 1990 biographical novel by American writer Jay Parini, who in turn based his novel on, amongst others, the memoirs of Bulgakov.

== Bibliography ==
- V. F. Bulgakov, L. Tolstoy in the last year of his life. A series of literary memoirs. State publishing fiction, 1960. (First published 1911) (English edition: The last year of Leo Tolstoy, New York, Dial Press, 1971.)
- V. F. Bulgakov, The conception of life of Leo Tolstoy. In letters to his secretary, VF Bulgakov. - M., ed. T-va Sytin, 1911.
- V. F. Bulgakov, "The War", Life for All. 1917. No.4.
- V. F. Bulgakov, L. Tolstoy and our present. On the ways of true revival. - M., 1919.
- V. F. Bulgakov, Wake up, people are brothers! The story appeals minded Tolstoy against World War of 1914-1918. T. 1. - M., Zadruga, 1922.
- V. F. Bulgakov, "Revolution in automobiles". (Petrograd, February 1917), In a strange land. 1924. No.6.
- V. F. Bulgakov, "Leo Tolstoy and the fate of Russian anti-militarism", Freedom of Russia. 1924. No.14-15.
- V. F. Bulgakov, The Tragedy of Tolstoy. L., 1928.
- V. F. Bulgakov, From the history museum of Leo Tolstoy in Moscow, Yasnaya Polyana collection. Tula, 1968.
- V. F. Bulgakov, Meetings with artists. - L., Artist of the RSFSR, 1969.
- V. F. Bulgakov, compiler, Словарь русских зарубежных писателей ("Glossary of Russian émigré writers"), New York: Norman Ross, 1993.
