= The Last Station (novel) =

Book by Jay Parini

- Author: Jay Parini
- Language: English
- Genre: Literary fiction
- Publisher: Holt Paperbacks
- Publication date: July 17, 1990
- Pages: 290

The Last Station is a novel by Jay Parini that was first published in 1990. It is the story of the final year in the life of Leo Tolstoy, told from multiple viewpoints, including Tolstoy's young secretary, Valentin Bulgakov, his wife, Sophia Tolstaya, his daughter Sasha, his publisher and close friend, Vladimir Chertkov, and his doctor, Dushan Makovitsky. The novel was an international best-seller, translated into more than thirty languages, and adapted into an Academy Award-nominated film of the same name (The Last Station).

== Plot ==
Set in 1910, the novel tells the true story of Tolstoy's life in his last days, before he ran away from his wife and his family home, taking to the road, where he died in a small railway station called Astapovo, with only his doctor and his favourite daughter, Sasha, in attendance (the film of this novel adds Valentin Bulgakov and others to the deathbed scene who were not, in fact, present).

The various narrators, and others in the Tolstoy household and outside of it, were pulling at him, trying to get his attention. He was pulled in a thousand directions at once, and this wore him down. In particular, he found the entreaties of his wife, Sofya, difficult, as she suspected (correctly) that he was plotting with his closest friend, Chertkov, to betray the family by giving away the copyright to his works. Sofya's main concern was the family and the difficulty of maintaining their style of life after her husband's death (he was, after all, 82).

A major subplot of the novel involves Tolstoy's young secretary, Valentin Bulgakov, who comes to work with his hero in 1910 and bears witness to the controversies and difficulties surrounding him. Bulgakov falls in love with Masha, a Tolstoyan, who lives at a nearby compound called Telyatink, where a group of “Tolstoyans” have gathered to live communally and put into practice his ideas: chastity, vegetarianism, and nonviolent resistance to evil. Like Tolstoy, these were pacifists who opposed the Tsarist regime.

The novel builds dramatically to a climax at the railway station at Astapovo, where Tolstoy thought he was dying alone, although a small army of reporters had gathered from around the world to report on the death of the famous author, who had the status of a saint or rock star in Russian society. His death was major news throughout the world.

This novel mines the contradictions between Tolstoy's religious and political convictions, and those of his followers, and the luxurious life he found himself living – having been born into the Russian aristocracy and inherited a major estate.

== Reception ==
The Last Station had consistent praise from critics at home and abroad.

On the front page of The New York Times Book Review, Miranda Seymour wrote: “The Last Station one of those rare works of fiction that manages to demonstrate both scrupulous historical research and true originality of voice and perception. . . . What lifts this book high above most historical novels is Jay Parini’s remarkable ability to enter the minds of his characters.”

Gore Vidal called the novel “One of the best historical novels written in the past twenty years.”

Writing in the Times Literary Supplement, John Bayley called this novel “a subtle masterpiece” and suggested that “Tolstoy himself would probably have recognized the work of a true artist.”

Reviewers consistently praised the lyrical quality of the writing. The Sunday Times of London said: “Jay Parini has written a stylish, beautifully paced and utterly beguiling novel.”

== Adaptations ==
The novel was made into an Academy Award-nominated film (also The Last Station) that was released in 2009, directed by Michael Hoffman and starring Helen Mirren, Christopher Plummer, Paul Giamatti, and James McAvoy.

The Last Station was adapted in 1999 for the stage by Blake Robison and Connan Morrissey.
