= Sons of Mississippi =

2003 nonfiction book by Paul Hendrickson

Sons of Mississippi: A Story of Race and Its Legacy
- Author: Paul Hendrickson
- Genre: Nonfiction
- Published: 2003
- Awards: Heartland Prize, National Book Critics Circle Award
- ISBN: 0-375-40461-9
- OCLC: 491986428
- Dewey Decimal: 305.8/009762/09045 21
- LC Class: F350.A1 H46 2003

Sons of Mississippi is a book by Paul Hendrickson about sheriffs in Mississippi. The book's starting point is a photograph by Charles Moore of seven sheriffs assembled in Oxford, Mississippi.

The photo was taken three days before James Meredith would enroll at University of Mississippi as its first African-American student; the sheriffs had come from different places in Mississippi to protest the enrollment. It was published in Life magazine in 1962 and headlined "Local Lawmen, Getting Ready to Block the Law".

Most of the sheriffs assembled had left Oxford by the time violence broke out on September 29–30. However, to Hendrickson, they represent an important cross-section of the forces of segregation.

Hendrickson spent seven years researching the book, with fellowships from the National Endowment for the Arts and the Guggenheim Foundation. He interviewed the two sheriffs who were still alive, as well as children, grandchildren, friends, enemies, and associates. Hendrickson also spoke to James Meredith and his son, Joseph Meredith.

The book pays special attention to the Ferrell family, headed by Sheriff Billy T. Ferrell, who is situated in the center of the Moore photograph and is swinging a billy club.

The Moore photograph depicts seven sheriffs, who in the photo, are situated from left to right as follows:

- Sheriff John Henry Spencer of Pittsboro, Calhoun County
- Sheriff James Ira Grimsley of Pascagoula, Jackson County
- Sheriff Bob Waller of Hattiesburg, Lamar County
- Sheriff Billy Ferrell of Natchez, Adams County (swinging)
- Sheriff Jimmy Middleton of Port Gibson, Claiborne County (further from camera)
- Deputy Sheriff James Wesley Garrison of Oxford, Lafayette County
- Sheriff John Ed Cothran of Greenwood, Leflore County

The Moore photograph also shows the back of a state trooper's head, close to the camera on the left, and it appears blurry and large.
