= Third Coast (disambiguation) =

Third Coast is an American region.

It may also refer to:

- Third Coast International Audio Festival, an audio documentary festival based in Chicago
- Third Coast (magazine), an American literary magazine
- "Third Coast", a song by Teezo Touchdown from How Do You Sleep at Night? With You, 2024
- The Third Coast, a book

== See also ==
- Third Coast Born
- Third Coast Kings
- Third Coast Percussion
