= Thomas Dyja =

American writer

- Born: Belmont Cragin, Chicago
- Education: Columbia University (BA)
- Occupation: Writer
- Writing career
- Notable awards: Heartland Prize (2013); Casey Award (1997)

Thomas Dyja is an American writer, living in New York City. He has written three novels, a biography of civil rights activist Walter Francis White, and historical books on Chicago and New York City. Play For A Kingdom received the Casey Award, and The Third Coast won the Chicago Tribune Heartland Prize for Nonfiction.

== Early life and education ==
Dyja grew up in Belmont Cragin, Chicago and attended Gordon Technical High School. He moved to New York City to attend Columbia University, graduating in 1984.

== Writing ==
Dyja's novel The Moon In Our Hands is based on the life of Walter Francis White. His history of New York City, New York, New York, New York: Four Decades of Success, Excess, and Transformation, covers the terms of five New York City mayors, including Ed Koch (1978–1989), David Dinkins (1990–1993), Rudy Giuliani (1994–2001), Michael Bloomberg (2002–2013), and Bill de Blasio (2014–2021).

== Publications ==
=== Novels by Dyja ===
- Play For A Kingdom: a Novel. Mariner, 1998. ISBN 978-0156006293.
- Meet John Trow. Viking, 2002. ISBN 978-0670030996.
- The Moon In Our Hands: a Novel. Da Capo, 2005. ISBN 978-0786715053.

=== Non-fiction books by Dyja ===
- Walter White: The Dilemma Of Black Identity In America. Ivan R. Dee, 2008. ISBN 978-1566637664.
- The Third Coast: When Chicago Built The American Dream. Penguin, 2013. ISBN 978-1594204326.
- New York, New York, New York: Four Decades of Success, Excess, and Transformation. Simon & Schuster, 2021. ISBN 978-1982149789.

=== Books with contributions by Dyja ===
- Only Connect: the Way to Save Our Schools. by Rudy Crew. Sarah Crichton, 2007. ISBN 978-0374294014.
- Up Is Down: Mid-Century Experiments in Advertising and Film at the Goldsholl Studio. Mary and Leigh Block Museum of Art, 2018. ISBN 978-1732568402.

=== Books edited by Dyja ===
- Heart: Stories of Learning to Love Again. Illumina. Marlowe, 2001. ISBN 978-1569246429.
- Life-Changing Stories of Coming of Age. Illumina. Marlowe, 2001. ISBN 978-1569245767.
- Awake: Stories of Life-Changing Epiphanies. Illumina. Marlowe, 2001. ISBN 978-1569245835.
- Life-Changing Stories of Forgiving and Being Forgiven. Illumina. Marlowe, 2001. ISBN 978-1569245750.

=== Booked edited with others ===
- The Hard Way: Writing by the Rebels Who Changed Sports. Da Capo, 1999. ISBN 978-1560252306. With a foreword by Jim Bouton.

== Awards ==
- 1997: Casey Award for Play For A Kingdom
- 2013: Chicago Tribune Heartland Prize for Nonfiction for The Third Coast
