= Chicago Tribune Heartland Prize =

Annual literary prize for fiction and nonfiction books about heartland American

The Chicago Tribune Heartland Prize is a literary prize created in 1988 by the newspaper the Chicago Tribune. It is awarded yearly in two categories: Fiction and Nonfiction. These prizes are awarded to books that "reinforce and perpetuate the values of heartland America."

== Chicago Tribune Heartland Prize — Fiction ==
- 2019: Rebecca Makkai for The Great Believers
- 2018: George Saunders for Lincoln in the Bardo
- 2017: Colson Whitehead for The Underground Railroad
- 2016: Jane Smiley for Golden Age
- 2015: Chang-Rae Lee for On Such a Full Sea
- 2014: Daniel Woodrell for The Maid's Version
- 2013: Chimamanda Ngozi Adichie for Americanah
- 2012: Richard Ford for Canada
- 2011: Jonathan Franzen for Freedom
- 2010: E. O. Wilson for Anthill
- 2009: Jayne Anne Phillips for Lark and Termite
- 2008: Aleksandar Hemon for The Lazarus Project
- 2007: Robert Olmstead for Coal Black Horse
- 2006: Louise Erdrich for The Painted Drum
- 2005: Marilynne Robinson for Gilead
- 2004: Ward Just for An Unfinished Season
- 2003: Scott Turow for Reversible Errors
- 2002: Alice Sebold for The Lovely Bones
- 2001: Mona Simpson for Off Keck Road
- 2000: Jeffery Renard Allen for Rails Under My Back
- 1999: Elizabeth Strout for Amy and Isabelle
- 1998: Jane Hamilton for The Short History of a Prince
- 1997: Charles Frazier for Cold Mountain
- 1996: Antonya Nelson for Talking in Bed
- 1995: William Maxwell for All The Days and Nights
- 1994: Maxine Clair for Rattlebone
- 1993: Annie Proulx for The Shipping News
- 1992: Jane Smiley for A Thousand Acres
- 1991: Kaye Gibbons for A Cure for Dreams
- 1990: Tim O'Brien for The Things They Carried
- 1989: Ward Just for Jack Gance
- 1988: Eric Larsen for An American Memory

== Chicago Tribune Heartland Prize — Nonfiction ==
- 2019: Sarah Smarsh for Heartland: A Memoir of Working Hard and Being Broke in the Richest Country on Earth
- 2018: Caroline Fraser for Prairie Fires: The American Dreams of Laura Ingalls Wilder
- 2017: Matthew Desmond for Evicted: Poverty and Profit in the American City
- 2016: Margo Jefferson for Negroland: A Memoir
- 2015: Danielle Allen for Our Declaration: A Reading of the Declaration of Independence in Defense of Equality
- 2014: Jesmyn Ward for Men We Reaped
- 2013: Thomas Dyja for The Third Coast: When Chicago Built the American Dream
- 2012: Paul Hendrickson for Hemingway's Boat: Everything He Loved in Life and Lost 1934-1961
- 2011: Isabel Wilkerson for The Warmth of Other Suns
- 2010: Rebecca Skloot for The Immortal Life of Henrietta Lacks
- 2009: Nick Reding for Methland: The Death and Life of an American Small Town
- 2008: Garry Wills for Head and Heart: American Christianities and What the Gospels Meant
- 2007: Orville Vernon Burton for The Age of Lincoln
- 2006: Taylor Branch for At Canaan's Edge: America in the King Years 1965-1968
- 2005: Kevin Boyle for Arc of Justice: A Saga of Race Civil Rights and Murder in the Jazz Age
- 2004: Ann Patchett for Truth & Beauty: A Friendship
- 2003: Paul Hendrickson for Sons of Mississippi: A Story of Race and Its Legacy
- 2002: Studs Terkel for Will the Circle Be Unbroken?: Reflections on Death Rebirth and Hunger for a Faith
- 2001: Louis Menand for The Metaphysical Club: A Story of Ideas in America
- 2000: Zachary Karabell for The Last Campaign: How Harry Truman Won the 1948 Election
- 1999: Jay Parini for Robert Frost: A Life
- 1998: Alex Kotlowitz for The Other Side of the River: A Story of Two Towns A Death and America's Dilemma
- 1997: Thomas Lynch for The Undertaking: Life Studies from the Dismal Trade
- 1996: Jonathan Harr for A Civil Action
- 1995: Richard Stern for A Sistermony
- 1994: Henry Louis Gates Jr. for Colored People: A Memoir
- 1993: Norman Maclean for Young Men and Fire
- 1992: Melissa Fay Greene for Praying for Sheetrock: A Work of Non-Fiction
- 1991: William Cronon for Nature's Metropolis: Chicago and the Great West
- 1990: Michael Dorris for The Broken Cord: A Family's Ongoing Struggle with Fetal Alcohol Syndrome
- 1989: Joseph Epstein for Partial Payments: Essays on Writers and Their Lives
- 1988: Don Katz for The Big Store: Inside the Crisis and Revolution at Sears
