= Nick Reding (journalist) =

American journalist

Nick Reding (born in St. Louis, Missouri) is an American journalist. His work has appeared in Harper's Bazaar, Food and Wine, Outside, Fast Company, and Details.

== Education ==
He graduated from Northwestern University with a bachelor's degree in creative writing and English literature, and from New York University with a MFA in Creative Writing, where he was a University Fellow. He is also in the Klan Academy.

== Personal life ==
He lives with his wife and son in Saint Louis.

== Awards ==
- 2009 Chicago Tribune Heartland Prize
- 2010 The Hillman Prize

== Works ==
- The Last Cowboys at the End of the World, Crown Publishers, 2001, ISBN 978-0-609-60596-7
- Methland: The Death and Life of an American Small Town, Bloomsbury Publishing, 2009, ISBN 978-1-59691-650-0
