= Benjamin's Crossing =

1996 historical novel by Jay Parini

- First edition cover
- Author: Jay Parini
- Language: English
- Publisher: Holt Paperbacks
- Publication date: July 15, 1996
- ISBN: 978-0805031805

Benjamin's Crossing is a 1996 historical novel written by Jay Parini about the Jewish critic and philosopher Walter Benjamin, and his escape over the Pyrenees from Nazi occupied France into Spain. It was a New York Times Notable Book of the year in 1997.

== Praise ==
Benjamin's Crossing received positive reviews. The New York Times wrote "Parini's story is at once painstakingly researched and dramatically recounted. It locates Benjamin's mystifying traits in a vivid and believable psychology. And it has something important to tell us, not just about Benjamin but about the role of the intellectual in modern Western society." The New Yorker called the book "a brisk, moving novel containing a parable without confining itself to a parable's two-dimensionality."
