= The Passages of H.M. =

2010 novel by Jay Parini

- First edition
- Author: Jay Parini
- Language: English
- Publisher: Doubleday
- Publication date: November 2, 2010

The Passages of H.M. is a 2010 historical novel written by Jay Parini about the life of Herman Melville.

== Reviews ==
The novel was well received. The New York Times said, "Parini's 'Passages' is a spokesman for the 'fiction is more true than fact' camp. Organized as a series of episodes, many of them imaginative reconstructions of what may have transpired on Melville's known sea voyages, 'Passages' purports to reveal the workings of Melville's mind as he finds his vocation as a writer." The Washington Post called the novel "A thoughtful re-imagining of the man who remains America's Milton." And the Los Angeles Times said "it is deeply absorbing.... A literary novel in every sense of the word.... It adds strongly to Melville's posthumous presence."
