= Devon Jersild =

American psychologist

- Born: August 25, 1958 (age 68); Oak Park, Illinois
- Education: Dartmouth College; Fielding Graduate University
- Occupations: Writer, psychologist
- Spouse: Jay Parini
- Children: 3

Devon Jersild (born August 25, 1958) is a clinical psychologist and author.

== Biography ==
Devon Jersild was born August 25, 1958. She graduated summa cum laude from Dartmouth College, and was awarded a master's degree by the Bread Loaf School of English, and a doctorate in clinical psychology by Fielding Graduate University.

Jersild was president of The Vermont Association for Psychoanalytic Studies from 2019 to 2021. Prior to becoming a psychologist, Jersild was the associate director of the Bread Loaf Writers' Conference, Associate Editor of the New England Review, and a visiting Lecturer in English at Middlebury College. Her essays and stories have appeared in such publications as The New York Times, The Kenyon Review, USA Today, Redbook, and Glamour Magazine.

She won an O. Henry Award in 1991 for her short story "In Which John Imagines His Mind as a Pond." Andre Dubus III wrote in the Los Angeles Times: "Jersild's language is cool and spare, her details muted, a style that serves her heart-thumping main character well, taking him, and us, to an ending that unfolds itself naturally, with a deliberate and excusable echo of James Joyce's The Dead."

Jersild is the author of Happy Hours: Alcohol in a Woman’s Life (HarperCollins), and has lectured widely on the subject of alcohol, as well as appearing on television shows, including The Oprah Winfrey Show and The Montel Williams Show.

Luminous Bodies: A Novel of Marie Curie (Paul Dry Books, 2026) is Jersild’s debut novel, a historical fiction portrait of Marie Curie’s life from her youth in Poland through her marriage, widowhood, and relationship with physicist Paul Langevin, and depicts her friendship with suffragist and scientist Hertha Ayrton.

== Awards ==
1991, O. Henry Award
