= Robert Pack (poet) =

American poet (1929–2023)

Robert Pack (May 19, 1929 – June 5, 2023) was an American poet and critic, and Distinguished Senior Professor in the Davidson Honors College at the University of Montana - Missoula. For thirty-four years he taught at Middlebury College and from 1973 to 1995 served as director of the Bread Loaf Writers' Conference. He is the author of twenty-two books of poetry and criticism. Pack has been called, by Harold Bloom, an heir to Robert Frost and Edwin Arlington Robinson, and has himself published a volume of admiring essays on Frost's poetry. He has co-edited several books with Jay Parini, including Writers on Writing: A Breadloaf Anthology.

== Biography ==
Pack received his B.A. from Dartmouth College in 1951 and an M.A. from Columbia University in 1953. Pack was awarded a Fulbright Fellowship to Italy to translate poetry in 1957. Upon his return, he began teaching at Barnard College. In 1964 Pack was invited to develop a new program in creative writing at Middlebury College. At Middlebury, Pack specialized in poetry workshops, modern British and American Poetry, English Romantic poetry, and the plays of Shakespeare. He was awarded the Abernethy Chair of American Literature and later a special College chair that allowed him to teach across the curriculum. In addition, he served as director of the Bread Loaf Writers' Conference from 1973 to 1995. Among the writers he recruited for the teaching staff were novelists John Gardner and John Irving and poets Howard Nemerov, Donald Justice, and Mark Strand. After retiring from Middlebury College in 1996, Pack and his wife Patty moved to Montana to be nearer to their three children, and Pack began teaching at the University of Montana Honors College. In 2006, the University of Montana awarded Pack its George M. Dennison Presidential Faculty Award for Distinguished Service.

His daughter, Pamela Pack, is a rock climber known for her pursuit of off-width cracks.

Pack died in 2023.

== Works ==
=== Poetry ===
- The Irony of Joy, Scribners (1955)
- A Stranger's Privilege, Macmillan Publishers (1959)
- Guarded by Women, Random House (1963)
- Home from the Cemetery, Rutgers University Press (1969)
- Nothing But Light, Rutgers University Press (1972)
- Keeping Watch, Rutgers University Press (1976)
- Waking to My Name: New and Selected Poems, Johns Hopkins University Press (1980)
- Clayfeld Rejoices, Clayfeld Laments: A Sequence of Poems, David R. Godine Press (1987)
- Before It Vanishes: A Packet of Poems for Professor Pagels, David R. Godine Press (1989)
- Fathering the Map: New and Selected Later Poems, University of Chicago Press (1993) ISBN 9780226644059
- Minding the Sun, University of Chicago Press (1996) ISBN 9780226644080
- Rounding It Out, University of Chicago Press (1999) ISBN 9780226644110
- Elk in Winter, University of Chicago Press (2004) ISBN 9780226644141
- Still Here, Still Now, University of Chicago Press (2009) ISBN 9780226644158
- Laughter Before Sleep, University of Chicago Press (2011) ISBN 9780226644196

=== Prose ===
- Wallace Stevens: An Approach to his Poetry and Thought, Rutgers University Press (1958)
- Faces in a Single Tree: A Cycle of Monologues, David R. Godine Press (1984)
- Affirming Limits: Essays on Morality, Choice, and Poetic Form, The University of Massachusetts Press (1985)
- The Long View: Essays on the Discipline of Hope and Poetic Craft, The University of Massachusetts Press (1991)
- Belief and Uncertainty in the Poetry of Robert Frost, The New England University Press (2003)
- Composing Voices: A Cycle of Dramatic Monologues, Lost Horse Press (2005)
- Literary Genius: 25 Classic Writers Who Define English & American Literature, Paul Dry Books (2007) (Illustrated by Barry Moser)
- Willing to Choose: Volition and Storytelling in Shakespeare's Major Plays, Lost Horse Press (2007)
