= Pamela Pack =

American rock climber (born 1976)

Pamela Shanti Pack (born circa 1976) is an American rock climber who specializes in off-width crack climbing. She has made "close to 80 first ascents", many of them in Vedauwoo, Wyoming.

Pack grew up in Middlebury, Vermont as the daughter of poet Robert Pack. As a child she was a competitive gymnast, but stopped after getting a stress fracture in her spine. She earned a degree in art and architecture from Yale University, and studied painting in Vermont and Paris before setting up an art studio in Seattle. She was formerly an ice climber, until a 2006 attack of compartment syndrome forced her to choose a climbing style that involved less gripping. She works as a cartographer, and lives in Missoula, Montana.

In 2009, Climbing magazine gave her their Golden Piton award for establishing Gabriel, a 5.13 crack route on Angels Landing in Zion National Park.
