= The Last Station =

2009 English-language German biographical film

- US theatrical release poster
- Directed by: Michael Hoffman
- Screenplay by: Michael Hoffman
- Based on: The Last Station by Jay Parini
- Produced by: Bonnie Arnold; Chris Curling; Jens Meurer
- Starring: Helen Mirren; Christopher Plummer; Paul Giamatti; Anne-Marie Duff; Kerry Condon; James McAvoy
- Cinematography: Sebastian Edschmid
- Edited by: Patricia Rommel
- Music by: Sergey Yevtushenko
- Production companies: Egoli Tossell Film; Zephyr Films; The Andrei Konchalovsky Production Center; SamFilm
- Distributed by: Warner Bros. Pictures (Germany); Nashe Kino (Russia); Optimum Releasing (United Kingdom)
- Release date: 23 December 2009
- Running time: 112 minutes
- Countries: Germany; Russia; United Kingdom
- Language: English
- Budget: $18 million
- Box office: $20.6 million

The Last Station is a 2009 internationally produced English-language biographical drama film written and directed by Michael Hoffman, and based on Jay Parini's 1990 biographical novel, which chronicled the final months of Leo Tolstoy's life. The film stars Christopher Plummer as Tolstoy and Helen Mirren as his wife Sofya Tolstaya. The film is about the battle between Sofya and his disciple Vladimir Chertkov for his legacy and the copyright of his works. The film premiered at the 2009 Telluride Film Festival.

== Plot ==
In 1910, the last year of Leo Tolstoy's life, his disciples, led by Vladimir Chertkov, manoeuvre against his wife, Sofya, for control over Tolstoy's works after his death. The main setting is the Tolstoy country estate of Yasnaya Polyana. Tolstoy and Sofya have had a long, passionate marriage, but his spiritual ideals and asceticism (he is opposed, for example, to private property) are at odds with her more aristocratic and conventionally religious views.

Contention focuses on a new will that the "Tolstoyans" are attempting to persuade him to sign. It would place all of his copyrights into the public domain, supposedly leaving his family without adequate support. The maneuvering is seen through the eyes of Tolstoy's new secretary, Valentin Bulgakov, who finds himself mediating between the two sides. He also has a love affair with one of the Tolstoyans, Masha.

Ultimately, Tolstoy signs the new will and travels to an undisclosed location where he can continue his work undisturbed. After his departure, Sofya unsuccessfully attempts suicide. During the journey, Tolstoy falls ill. The film ends with his death near the Astapovo railway station where Sofya is allowed by their daughter to see him just moments before his death. The closing credits state that in 1914 the Russian senate reverted the copyrights of Tolstoy's work to Sofya.

== Cast ==
- Helen Mirren as Sofya, Tolstoy's wife
- Christopher Plummer as Tolstoy
- Paul Giamatti as Chertkov, the leader of Tolstoy's devoted disciples
- James McAvoy as Valentin, Tolstoy's private secretary
- John Sessions as Dushan, Tolstoy's personal doctor
- Patrick Kennedy as Sergeyenko
- Kerry Condon as Masha, a fictional member of the Tolstoyans
- Anne-Marie Duff as Sasha, Tolstoy's daughter

== Production ==
Filming took place in the German federal states of Saxony-Anhalt, Brandenburg (Studio Babelsberg) and Thuringia, the city of Leipzig in Saxony and at historical locations in Russia. The location for Jasnaja Poljana, the residence of the Tolstoy family, was the Schloss Stülpe palace near Luckenwalde in Brandenburg. The station of the small German town of Pretzsch stood in for Astapovo, the "last station" of the title. Still a working rural station, the Pretzsch station was closed for two weeks for filming.

== Release and reception ==
Sony Pictures Classics acquired distribution rights and gave the film an awards-qualifying limited release on 23 December 2009, with a wide release on 15 January 2010. It was released in Germany on 28 January 2010.

On the review aggregator website Rotten Tomatoes, 70% of 145 critics' reviews are positive, with an average rating of 6.7/10. The website's consensus reads: "Michael Hoffman's script doesn't quite live up to its famous subject, but this Tolstoy biopic benefits from a spellbinding tour de force performance by Helen Mirren." Metacritic, which uses a weighted average, assigned the film a score of 76 out of 100, based on 34 critics, indicating "generally favorable" reviews.

Critic Philip French praised McAvoy for bringing "the same amiable diffidence he brought to the role of Idi Amin's confidant in The Last King of Scotland". Kenneth Turan of the Los Angeles Times called Hoffman's direction "accomplished", and the film's centerpiece "the spectacular back and forth between Christopher Plummer and Helen Mirren...For those who enjoy actors who can play it up without ever overplaying their hands, "The Last Station" is the destination of choice." On the negative side, critic Xan Brooks characterized the film as a "genteel domestic farce" and faulted the director for "pander[ing] to the worst impulses of the cast".

== Accolades ==
Mirren won the Best Actress award at the 2009 Rome International Film Festival and at the 9th AARP Movies for Grownups Awards for her performance. She was also nominated for Best Actress – Drama at the 67th Golden Globe Awards, as was Plummer for Best Supporting Actor in a Motion Picture. Both actors also received nominations for their performances at the Academy Awards and the Screen Actors Guild Awards.

== Home media ==
The film was released on DVD and Blu-ray on 22 June 2010.
