= Paul Hendrickson =

American author, journalist, and professor

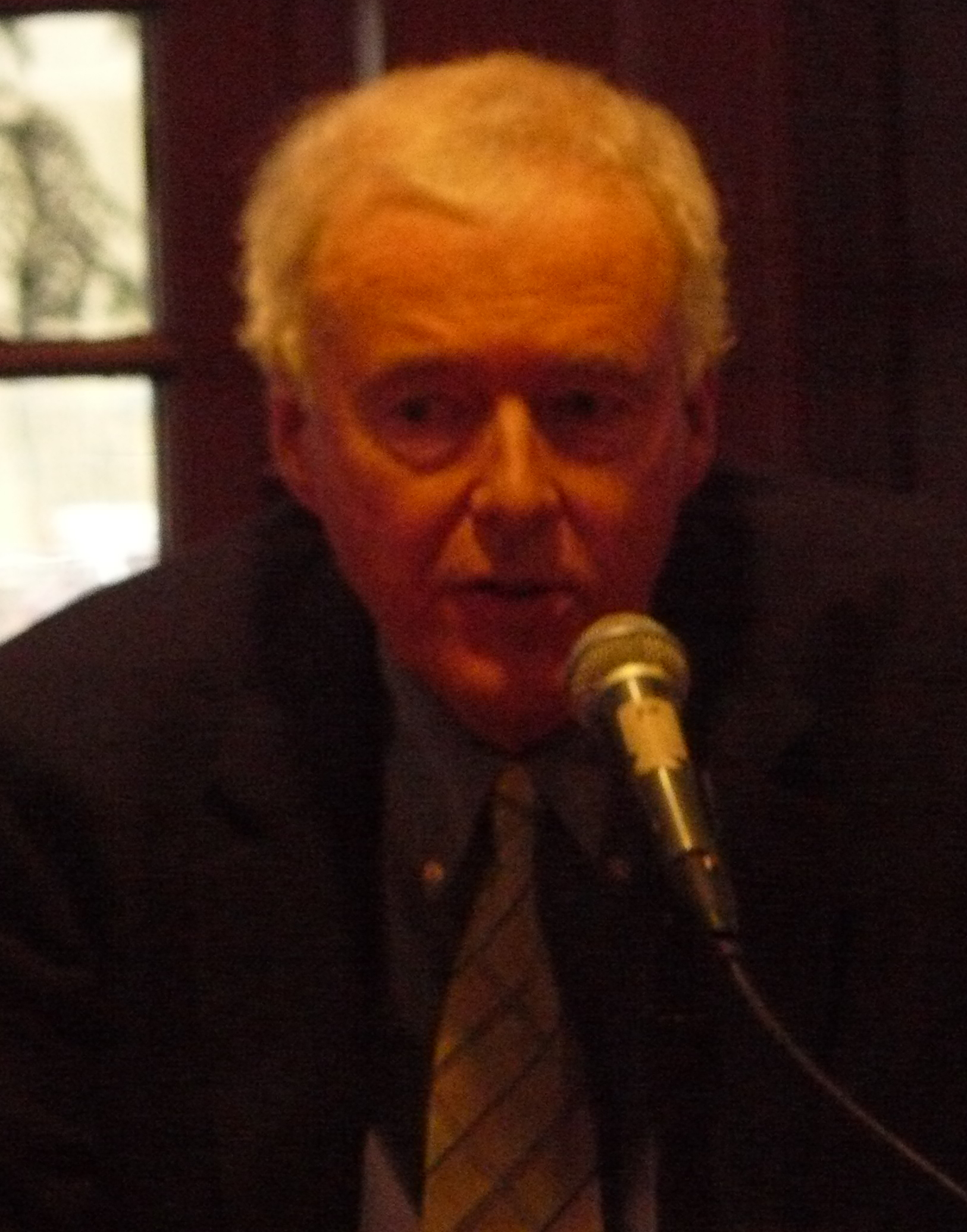
- Hendrickson in 2011
- Born: Paul Joseph Hendrickson; April 29, 1944 (age 82); Fresno, California
- Education: Bachelor of Arts and Master's degree in English
- Alma mater: St. Louis University; Pennsylvania State University
- Occupations: Author, journalist, professor
- Spouse: Cecilia M. Hendrickson
- Writing career
- Language: English
- Period: 1983–present
- Genre: Nonfiction
- Subject: Biography
- Notable works: Looking For The Light; The Living and the Dead; Sons of Mississippi; Hemingway's Boat
- Notable awards: National Book Critics Circle Award (2003); Heartland Prize (2003); Heartland Prize (2012)

Paul Hendrickson (born April 29, 1944) is an American author, journalist, and professor. He is a senior lecturer and member of the Department of English at the University of Pennsylvania. He is a former member of the writing staff at the Washington Post.

He has been honored with two writing fellowships from the National Endowment for the Arts (NEA), as well as fellowships from the Guggenheim Foundation, Lyndhurst Foundation, and Alicia Patterson Foundation. In 2003, he received the National Book Critics Circle Award and the Chicago Tribune's Heartland Prize for Sons of Mississippi: A Story of Race and Its Legacy. In 2012, he was honored with a second Heartland Prize for Hemingway's Boat: Everything He Loved in Life, and Lost, 1934-1961. It was also a New York Times bestseller and finalist for the National Book Critics Circle Award. In 2019, Hendrickson published a book about Frank Lloyd Wright, supported through a fellowship with the NEA, entitled Plagued by Fire: The Dreams and Furies of Frank Lloyd Wright.

== Personal background ==
Paul Joseph Hendrickson was born on April 29, 1944, in Fresno, California. He is the son of Joseph Paul and Rita Bernice (née Kyne) Hendrickson. He was raised in Kankakee and Wheaton, Illinois. From age 14 to 21, Hendrickson attended Missionary Servants of the Most Holy Trinity Catholic seminary in Alabama, intent on preparing for the priesthood. He attended St. Louis University, earning a Bachelor's degree in English in 1967. He also earned a Master's degree in 1968 in English, with a concentration in American literature from Pennsylvania State University.

On September 13, 1969, Hendrickson married Sunday Barbagallo. The marriage ended in divorce in February 1974. On March 10, 1979, he married Cecilia Moffatt, a nurse. Together, they have two grown sons, John and Matthew. Hendrickson and his wife live in Havertown, Pennsylvania.

Hendrickson donated his papers to the libraries of the College of William & Mary in 2024.

== Professional background ==
=== Journalism ===
Following his 1968 graduation from Pennsylvania State University, Hendrickson began his journalism career, serving as a publicist, writer, and producer on staff at WPSX-TV in University Park, Pennsylvania. In 1971, he joined the reporting team of the travel magazine Holiday, based out of Indianapolis, Indiana. After two years, he signed on as a reporter for the Detroit Free Press broadsheet newspaper of Detroit, Michigan. In 1974, he began reporting for the National Observer in Washington, D.C., remaining on staff through 1977, when the publication ceased.

In 1977, Hendrickson joined the staff of The Washington Post as a feature writer and reporter for the newspaper's Style section, covering culture and the arts. He remained with the organization through 2001.

=== Academics ===
When he was working on staff at The Washington Post, Hendrickson began facilitating nonfiction writing workshops at the University of Pennsylvania. In 1998, he joined the faculty of the university, where he is now a senior lecturer. In 2005, the university honored him with the Provost's Award for Distinguished Teaching. In 2009, he served as a visiting professor at Duke University, where he taught documentary practice. He also taught American studies at the University of North Carolina, Chapel Hill.

=== Writing ===
As of 2014, Hendrickson has written five nonfiction books, including a memoir and biographies about Marion Post Wolcott, Robert McNamara, and Ernest Hemingway.

Seminary: A Search

His first book, Seminary: A Search, was published in 1983. A memoir, the work presented his early life studying for the priesthood in Alabama during the 1950s and 1960s. In October 1982, Playboy Magazine printed an excerpt of the book entitled "Fear of Faggotry: Growing Up in the Seminary". The magazine named the book the best nonfiction work of the year.

Looking For The Light: The Hidden Life and Art of Marion Post Wolcott

His second book, Looking For The Light: The Hidden Life and Art of Marion Post Wolcott (1992), gained critical acclaim. It was a finalist for the National Book Critics Circle Award.

The Living and the Dead: Robert McNamara and Five Lives of a Lost War (1996)

The Living and the Dead: Robert McNamara and Five Lives of a Lost War was published by Alfred A. Knopf. The New York Times referred to the book as "a work that approaches a Shakespearean tragedy". Steve Weinberg of The Philadelphia Inquirer said that it was "meticulously reported, exquisitely written". The work was named a finalist for the National Book Award and recognized as a New York Times Notable Book, while Salon.com ranked it as the Nonfiction Book of the Year.

Sons of Mississippi: A Story of Race and Its Legacy

Sons of Mississippi deals with seven white sheriffs photographed by Charles Moore in Oxford, Mississippi, on September 27, 1962. The first part of the book examines each of the sheriffs individually, in relation to their families and their home counties, and in the context of the segregated ("totalitarian") society of the time in Mississippi. The second part focuses on James Meredith, the first black student at the University of Mississippi. When he was admitted, the sheriffs were convened to deal with issues at the university. In the third segment, Hendrickson discusses the descendants of these sheriffs.

While researching and writing the book, Hendrickson was financially supported through fellowships from the Guggenheim Foundation and National Endowment for the Arts. Published in 2003, the book received the Chicago Tribune's Heartland Prize and the National Book Critics Circle Award.

Hemingway's Boat: Everything He Loved in Life, and Lost, 1934-1961

Hemingway's Boat: Everything He Loved in Life, and Lost, 1934-1961 (2011) was published by Knopf. While Hendrickson reportedly spent seven years writing the book, he began informal research in 1980, when he met Ernest Hemingway's younger brother, Leicester on a seaplane flight to the Bahamas. During their vacation in the Caribbean, Hendrickson and his wife had the opportunity to spend time with Leicester Hemingway, while researching and learning about the life of the deceased author. Seven years later, while Hendrickson was at The Washington Post, he began an in-depth two-part series for the newspaper, which focused on the lives of author Hemingway's three children. Based on his 1980 Bahamas research and personal encounter with Leicester, along with the Hemingway series for the Post, Hendrickson eventually began writing his book.

According to Allan Massie in The Wall Street Journal, Hendrickson spent at least 30 years contemplating the life of Hemingway, prior to writing his book. He spent time researching the life of Hemingway by reading biographies and articles written about the author. He also discussed the subject's life with Hemingway's sons and some of his grandchildren, friends, and associates. Massie surmised that Hendrickson most likely knows more about Hemingway than anyone living today or during Hemingway's lifetime. In their "Best Nonfiction of 2011" roundup, the Wall Street Journal named the work the best biography of 2011, additionally stating that in Hendrickson's book, "Hemingway has never seemed so vivid or his work so heroic."

The work was a New York Times bestseller. It was on bestseller lists around the US, while the UK edition reached No. 3 on the London bestseller list. It was a finalist for the National Book Critics Circle Award, while The Chicago Tribune honored it with the 2012 Heartland Prize. As of 2014, the work has gone to seven printings in hardcover. Howell Raines of The Washington Post in his review of the work stated that "in the academic field of Hemingway studies, the book will stand as an indispensable document". Olivia Laing of The Guardian states that Hendrickson is "a miraculously lovely writer." In her review of Hemingway's Boat, she reflects on his style of writing as "twists and turns through time, moving sensitively between the books and life. He understands too the deep allure the ocean held for Hemingway".

== Honors and awards ==
Writing awards

- 1987 Penney-Missouri Award for Excellence in Reporting.
- 1992: National Book Critics Circle Award for Looking For The Light: The Hidden Life and Art of Marion Post Wolcott – finalist
- 1996: National Book Award for The Living and the Dead: Robert McNamara and Five Lives of a Lost War – finalist
- 1996: New York Times Notable Book for The Living and the Dead: Robert McNamara and Five Lives of a Lost War
- 1997: Helen Bernstein Book Award for Excellence in Journalism of the New York Public Library for The Living and the Dead: Robert McNamara and Five Lives of a Lost War – finalist
- 2003: National Book Critics Circle Award for Sons of Mississippi: A Story of Race and Its Legacy – winner
- 2003: Southern Book Critics Circle Award for Sons of Mississippi: A Story of Race and Its Legacy – finalist
- 2003: Chicago Tribune Heartland Prize for Sons of Mississippi: A Story of Race and Its Legacy – winner
- 2012: National Book Critics Circle Award for Hemingway's Boat: Everything He Loved in Life, and Lost, 1934-1961 – finalist
- 2012: Chicago Tribune Heartland Prize for Nonfiction for Hemingway's Boat: Everything He Loved in Life, and Lost, 1934-1961 – winner

Fellowships

- 1980–1981: Alicia Patterson Foundation
- 1985–1987: Lyndhurst Foundation
- 1999: Guggenheim Foundation
- 2002: National Endowment for the Arts
- 2012: National Endowment for the Arts

Teaching honors

- 2005: Provost's Award for Distinguished Teaching from the University of Pennsylvania

== Published works ==
Books

- Hendrickson, Paul (1983). Seminary: A Search, New York: Simon & Schuster, 330 pages. ISBN 978-0671420307
- Hendrickson, Paul (1992). Looking For The Light: The Hidden Life and Art of Marion Post Wolcott, New York: Alfred A. Knopf, 297 pages. ISBN 978-0394577296
- Hendrickson, Paul (1996). The Living and the Dead: Robert McNamara and Five Lives of a Lost War, New York: Alfred A. Knopf, 427 pages. ISBN 978-0679427612
- Hendrickson, Paul (2003). Sons of Mississippi: A Story of Race and Its Legacy, New York: Alfred A. Knopf, 368 pages. ISBN 978-0375404610
- Hendrickson, Paul (2004). Bound for Glory: America in Color, 1939-43, New York: Harry N. Abrams, 192 pages. ISBN 978-0810943483
- Hendrickson, Paul (2011). Hemingway's Boat: Everything He Loved in Life, and Lost, 1934-1961, New York: Alfred A. Knopf, 544 pages. ISBN 978-1400041626
- Hendrickson, Paul (2019). Plagued by Fire: The Dreams and Furies of Frank Lloyd Wright, New York: Alfred A. Knopf, 624 pages. ISBN 978-0385353656

Selected articles

- Hendrickson, Paul (July 29–30, 1987). "Papa's Boys: The Random Legacies of the Hemingways". Washington Post. Washington D.C. Archived from the original on March 25, 2016 – via HighBeam Research.
- Hendrickson, Paul (1989-07-24). "Montgomery: 1955: The Supporting Actors in the Historic Bus Boycott". The Washington Post. Washington D.C. Archived from the original on 2016-03-04 – via HighBeam Research.
- Hendrickson, Paul (1990-11-18). "The Lost Dreams of Bert DeLeeuw". Washington Post. Washington D.C.
- Hendrickson, Paul (July 1991). "It's Been a Wonderful Life: Jimmy Stewart", LIFE, page 66.
- Hendrickson, Paul (1991-10-09). "Mark of the Urban Phantom". Washington Post. Washington D.C.
- Hendrickson, Paul (1992-01-20). "Her Dark Passage: The Days and Nights of Fannie Ray". Washington Post. Washington D.C. Archived from the original on 2016-04-09 – via HighBeam Research.
- Hendrickson, Paul (1992-03-20). "Driving Miss Fannie: A Homeless Woman Returns to Her Past". Washington Post. Washington D.C. Archived from the original on 2018-11-18 – via HighBeam Research.
- Hendrickson, Paul (1997-01-27). "America's Answer to Royalty: A Coronation Without a Crown". Washington Post. Washington D.C.
- Hendrickson, Paul (1997-04-03). "A Wonderful Life: Jimmy Stewart Mixed Innocence and Anger and Became a Legend". Washington Post. Washington D.C.
- Hendrickson, Paul (1997-09-06). "Amid the World's Poor, a Great Treasure". Washington Post. Washington D.C.
- Hendrickson, Paul (1998-05-05). "Janis Joplin: A Cry Cutting Through Time". Washington Post. Washington D.C.
- Hendrickson, Paul (1998-06-04). "The Essential Enigma of Robert F. Kennedy Remains, Even 30 Years Later". Washington Post. Washington D.C.
- Hendrickson, Paul (1998-07-22). "From the Fires of Hate, An Ember of Hope". Washington Post. Washington D.C.
- Hendrickson, Paul (1998-11-12). "On Veterans Day, a Busload of Memories". Washington Post. Washington D.C.
- Hendrickson, Paul (2002-04-28). "The Nation: Altar-Boy Innocents; A Former Seminarian Reflects on Moral Ambivalence". The New York Times.
- Hendrickson, Paul (February 2005). "Savoring Pie Town". Smithsonian.com.
- Hendrickson, Paul (Summer 2005). "Mississippi Haunting". Rhetoric & Public Affairs. 8 (2). Michigan State University Press: 177–188. doi:10.1353/rap.2005.0074. S2CID 201789429.
- Hendrickson, Paul (Summer 2005). "The Ladies Before Rosa: Let Us Now Praise Unfamous Women". Rhetoric & Public Affairs. 8 (2). Michigan State University Press: 287–298. doi:10.1353/rap.2005.0076. S2CID 192462147.
- Hendrickson, Paul (2013-05-19). "An Audible Feast". The New York Times.
