= Promised Land: Thirteen Books That Changed America =

- First edition cover
- Author: Jay Parini
- Language: English
- Publisher: Doubleday
- Publication date: November 11, 2008

Promised Land: Thirteen Books That Changed America is a non-fiction work of literary criticism written by Jay Parini. A listing of 100 additional books is included at the very end of the book.

== Reviews ==
Promised Land received positive reviews. The Wall Street Journal said, "It's like watching a time-lapse film of cultural evolution -- with perennial motifs of American life changing colors and sprouting the odd appendage over the course of two centuries."

Maureen Corrigan from NPR's Fresh Air, said the book is "surprising ... thoughtful ...convincing ... Readers will benefit from dipping into Parini's book and reacquainting themselves with the nation's bedrock myths and stories".
