= The Oxford Encyclopedia of American Literature =

2004 encyclopedia published by Oxford University Press

- Editor: Jay Parini
- Publisher: Oxford University Press
- Publication date: 2004

The Oxford Encyclopedia of American Literature is a 2004 encyclopedia published by Oxford University Press and edited by Jay Parini.

== Content ==
The encyclopedia sought to provide a "comprehensive discussion of literary practices within the United States from colonial times to the present" and consisted of 4 volumes and 350 essays drawn from 190 authors. The contributors were predominantly drawn from American institutions. The essays analyzed aspects of literature including books, authors, and literary movements. The encyclopedia was aimed at a general audience without specialized knowledge of the field. The entries are arranged alphabetically rather than chronologically. The preface stated that supplements would be published.

== Reception ==
Some reviewers compared the encyclopedia to The Cambridge Encyclopedia of American Literature. A review in the Rocky Mountain Review of Language and Literature asked why Oxford University Press needed to publish the encyclopedia, noting that it duplicated efforts of many other works. The review opined that it failed to "catalyze research" and engages in "opinion mongering and a curious myopia about experimental writing." A reviewer in Reference & User Services Quarterly noted the encyclopedia adequately met the general expectations for encyclopedias, such as crediting the essays and properly citing sources. They felt the author biographies presented were done better elsewhere but praised the essays on themes in literature as setting the encyclopedia "apart". The reviewer concluded that the volumes were not "essential" to studying literature but still made an "excellent addition to the reference shelves".

A reviewer for Reference Reviews concluded that "serious collections will not be able to manage without The Oxford Encyclopedia of American Literature, which will prove invaluable to enquirers and scholars at basic and intermediary levels of enquiry." Booklist noted several items it considered to be omissions in the book's coverage, particularly of contemporary authors, highlighting the lack of mentions of John Guare, Paul Auster, Steven Millhauser, and John Kennedy Toole. In comparison to other similar encyclopedias, it determined that it was "intrinsically better but lacks the same breadth" and concluded "The Oxford set is praiseworthy and recommended for most high-school, public, and academic libraries, though it needs to be used in conjunction with other, more comprehensive resources."
