= United Council of Religious Communities and Groups =

The United Council of Religious Communities and Groups (Russian: Объединенный совет религиозных общин и групп), also known as OSROG, was a committee of representatives of various minority religious movements within the Russian SFSR created in 1918 by Vladimir Chertkov. In January 1919, the Council received an official role as a decree of the Council of People's Commissars charged it with the task of evaluating claims of conscientious objection to the revolutionary government's conscription regime. However, the decree always had opposition within the Soviet hierarchy (its publication was delayed by nearly five months), and other decrees and rulings from late 1920 onwards steadily restricted its activities, including its right to evaluate claims of conscientious objection. As a result, the Russian Baptist Union, one of the main participants in OSROG, decided in December 1921 that continued involvement was no longer in its interests. It is not certain exactly when OSROG stopped operating altogether: suggested dates vary between 1922 and 1928, with 1923 being the most likely.
