= Robert Frost: A Life =

Biography of Robert Frost

- First edition cover
- Author: Jay Parini
- Language: English
- Publication date: March 15, 2000

Robert Frost: A Life is a 2000 biography of the American poet Robert Frost written by Jay Parini. It won the Chicago Tribune Heartland Prize for best non-fiction book of the year.

== Praise ==
Robert Frost: A Life received positive reviews. Publishers Weekly noted "there could be no better tribute for a poet so often underrated, maligned and misunderstood than this sympathetic and balanced portrayal." The New York Times called the book "a pleasure to read, combining penetrating commentary on the poetry and good illustrative anecdotes. Mr. Parini has brought Frost more sharply into focus."

== Awards ==
- Chicago Tribune Heartland Prize for best non-fiction book of the year.
