= Maxine Clair =

American writer (1939–2025)

Maxine Deloris Clair (née Smith; February 18, 1939 – September 5, 2025) was an American novelist, poet and short-story writer. Her debut novel Rattlebone won the Heartland Prize in 1994. She was awarded a Guggenheim Fellowship for fiction in 1995.

== Life and career ==
Born in Kansas City, Kansas, on February 18, 1939, Clair attended the University of Kansas and went onto a career in medical technology, becoming the chief technologist at a children's hospital in the Washington, D.C., area. While working in the hospital she became interested in writing and completed an M.F.A at American University. Clair went on to become a professor at George Washington University until 2008 when she retired as professor emerita. Her first book, the poetry collection Coping with Gravity, was published in 1988.

Clair's best known work is the 1994 novel Rattlebone, the title of which comes from the neighborhood Rattlebone Hollow in the north of Kansas City. The novel was reissued by McNally Editions in 2022. Her book received a Heartland Prize during 1994. A character from Rattlebone, the teacher October Brown, reappears in a later novel October Suite, which was a finalist for the Hurston/Wright Legacy Award in 2002.

Clair died in Washington, D.C., on September 5, 2025, at the age of 86.
