= Volkonsky House =

Building in Moscow, Russia

Coordinates: 55.7526°N 37.6052°E

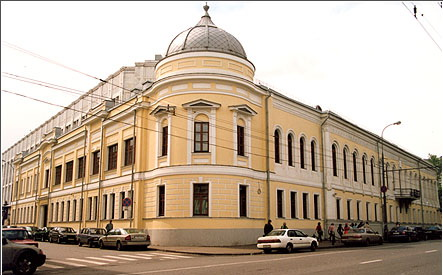
The building in 2009, before its reconstruction

The Volkonsky House (Russian: Дом Волконского, romanized: Dom Volkonskogo), also called Grushetsky House (Дом Грушецкого, Dom Grushetskogo) located at 9 Vozdvizhenka Street in central Moscow, Russia is considered the prototype of the house of old Prince Bolkonsky in Leo Tolstoy's 1869 novel War and Peace. The building was constructed in the 18th and 19th centuries, but was completely rebuilt in 2013, raising its height from two stories to four.

== History ==
Vasily Vladimirovich Grushetsky (1743 - 1813) bought the land in 1774 and built much of the house over the next few years. He was an officer of the Semenov Life Guards regiment and fought in the Russian-Turkish war of 1768 -1774. He was an in-law and subordinate of Prince Vasily Dolgorukov famous for his conquest of the Crimea. Grushetsky fought in the assault of Perekop and the battle of Alushta.

The house later belonged to his daughter P. V. Muraveva-Apostol, who sold the house in 1816 to Prince Nikolai Sergeyevich Volkonsky. Volkonsky was the maternal grandfather of Leo Tolstoy, and is believed to be the prototype of Prince Bolkonsky in War and Peace. The novel refers to "an old, gloomy house on Vozdvizhenka", where some of the scenes of the novel occur.

From the 1830s the mansion belonged to the Rumin family, who were nobility from Ryazan. Tolstoy visited the Ryumins and met P. S. Scherbatovaya in the house. She was the prototype of Kitty Scherbatskaya in his 1878 novel Anna Karenina.

In the early twentieth century the mansion was owned by Shamsi Asadulaev, an oilman from Baku, Azerbaijan. In Soviet times, the building was occupied by several organizations, including the People's Commissariat for Naval Affairs, the editorial offices of "Peasant Newspaper" and "History of the Civil War" and others. Later, the house belonged to the Ministry of Foreign Affairs. It is now privately owned.

The modern look of the house was formed in the reconstructions at the turn of 20th century and in the 2010s. The north facade facing Vozdvizhenka Street was rebuilt in 1897 by architect K. Terek, and the facade facing Holy Cross Lane and the dome on the corner of the house were added by P. Zarutsky in 1907. Before 2009, the house was identified by a plaque as an object of cultural heritage.

In 2013, despite numerous objections by politicians and cultural figures, the building was reconstructed, increasing the height from 2 to 4 stories, and rebuilding the dome.

== Current ownership ==
The building, according to Reuters, is owned by the Centre for the Development of Inter-personal Communications (CDIC), which is controlled by Lyudmila Putina, the former wife of Russian President Vladimir Putin.

The CDIC's offices are in the building, but it is mainly occupied by commercial tenants, including VTB Bank, Sberbank, Severstroygroup - a construction company, a sushi restaurant and a Burger King. Total rent from the building is about $3-$4 million.

Tenants pay their rent to a company known as Meridian, which is in turn owned by a company known as Intererservis, which is wholly owned by Lyudmila Alexandrovna Shkrebnyova, which is Putina's maiden name. Putina's sister, Olga Alexandrovna Tsomayeva, was previously General Director of Intererservis. Artur Ocheretny, Putina's current husband, chairs the CDIC's management board.
