= Surikov =

Surikov (Russian: Суриков) is a Russian masculine surname originating from the word surik ("scarlet pigment"); its feminine counterpart is Surikova. It may refer to the following notable people:

- Aleksandr Surikov (born 1940), Russian statesman
- Alla Surikova (born 1940), Soviet and Russian film director, writer, and teacher
- Ivan Surikov (1841–1880), Russian poet
- Konstantin Surikov, Russian politician
- Stepan Surikov (born 2002), Russian football player
- Vasily Surikov (1848–1916), Russian painter
  - Vasily Surikov, a 1959 Soviet biographical film
  - Surikov (crater) on Mercury
