= Vladimir Chertkov =

Russian editor (1854–1936)

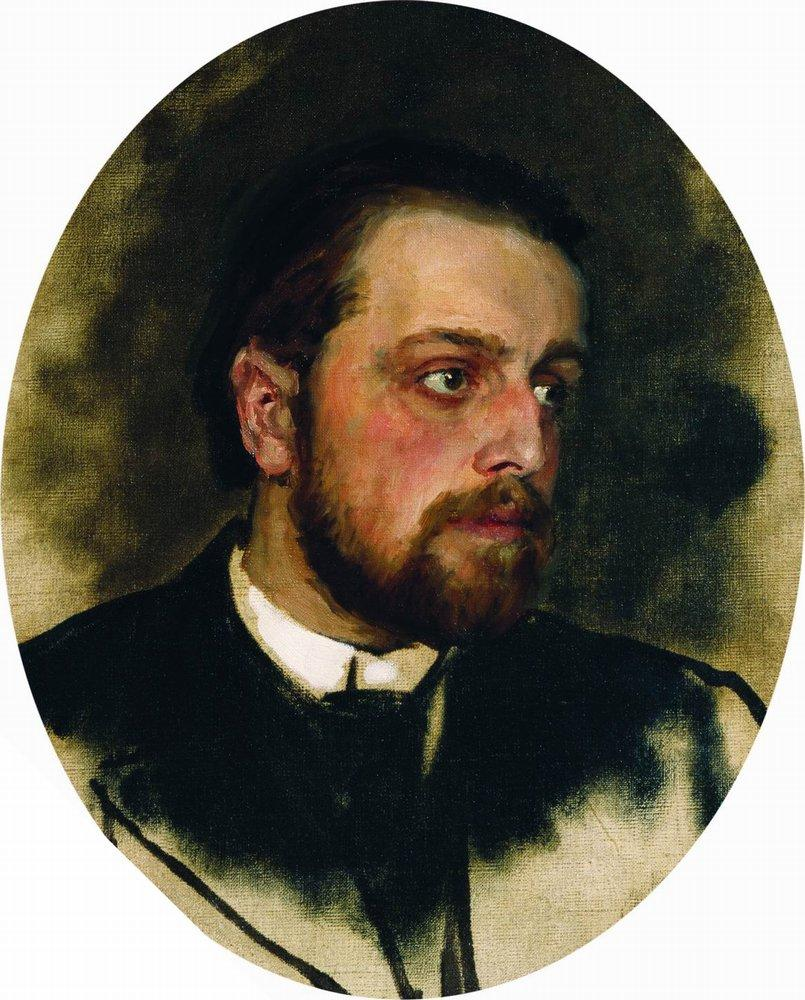
- Portrait of V. Chertkov by Ilya Repin (c. 1890)
- Born: Vladimir Grigoryevich Chertkov; 3 November 1854; Saint Petersburg, Russian Empire
- Died: 9 November 1936 (aged 82); Moscow, USSR

Vladimir Grigoryevich Chertkov (Russian: Влади́мир Григо́рьевич Чертко́в), also transliterated as Chertkoff, Tchertkoff or Tschertkow (3 November [O.S. 22 October] 1854 – 9 November 1936), was one of the editors of the works of Leo Tolstoy, and one of the most prominent Tolstoyans. After the revolutions of 1917, Chertkov was instrumental in creating the United Council of Religious Communities and Groups, which eventually came to administer the Russian SFSR's conscientious objection program.

== Life and career ==
=== Family and childhood ===
Chertkov was born in 1854 in St. Petersburg, Russia into a wealthy and aristocratic family. His mother (to whom he felt especially close), Elizaveta Ivanovna, born Countess Chernysheva-Kruglikova, was known among her circle in St. Petersburg society for her beauty, intellect, authoritativeness and tact. His father, Grigorii Ivanovich, was aide-de-camp under Nikolai I, Adjutant-General under Alexander II and Alexander III, known in military circles for his front-line service and military bearing. The couple enjoyed imperial favour so much that Alexander II and Alexander III visited their home.

Describing his parents in one of his diary entries, he wrote: “That's how I grew up, assured of my own innate advantage over other people, proud of the dignity of my parents, their relatives and friends, entourage of servants, rising from their seats in the ante-room when I passed from my rooms into my parents’ part of the house, swimming in all kinds of luxury and almost not knowing rejection in satisfaction of my desires.”

The young Chertkov was described as slender and tall, with big gray eyes under beaked brows, and was said to have a talent for witty paradox.

=== Military service ===
Nineteen-year-old Chertkov voluntarily joined the Life Guards of the Cavalry. Yet while yielding to all the enjoyment that was offered by life in the circle of golden youth, unaware of either external or internal obstacles for the realization of his desires, Chertkov from time to time felt that there was something wrong in his life and strove to find some moral law that would subordinate his behavior. In order to understand these doubts, to look closer at other ways of life and remain alone with himself, he decided for a time to abandon his accustomed life, take a vacation for several months and go to England.

At the end of December 1879, Chertkov wrote his mother a letter from England:

"I can tell you a few fragments of my last thoughts:

1. In order to be useful, a person must define his position in the world around him;
2. He must therefore look at himself not subjectively but objectively; and
3. He can only reach such a view when the strength of all his aspirations is concentrated not upon himself, but on some kind of high goal, located outside himself.”

And he wrote further that concentrating all his thought on Christian study could be useful to deal with the problems of his life.

=== Lizinovka ===
In 1880, he resigned from military service, left Petersburg, and settled in his family's estate in Lizinovka, where he planned to help the peasants at whose expense he lived, although he had an unclear understanding of their needs.

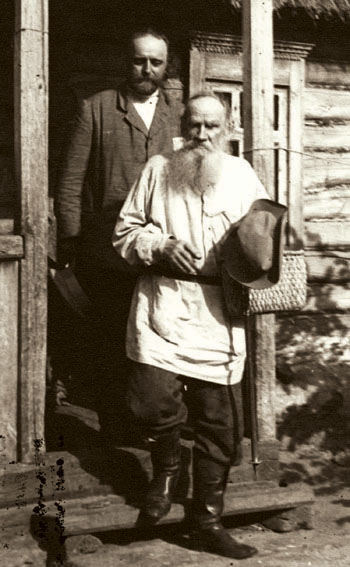
Chertkov and Leo Tolstoy in 1894

Scrutinizing the work of the zemstvo and finding weaknesses, he conceived the idea of implementing on his parents' estate some measures disregarded by the zemstvo. He organized a trade school for peasant children.

=== Influence of Tolstoy ===
In October 1883 his first meeting with Leo Tolstoy took place in Moscow, changing the entire course of his life. It would be said of him that he was more Tolstoy than Tolstoy himself.

Fulfilling the ideal of moral self-improvement, Chertkov gave all his heart and soul to educational activity. Following Tolstoy's initiative, in 1885 Chertkov organized and financed a publishing house called Intermediary (Russian: Посредник) which specialized in the release of art and moralizing literature for people. Intermediary succeeded in publishing works aimed at the education of the Russian people, despite the pressure of the Imperial censorship and the hostile attitude of the Eastern Orthodox Church. The new publishing house was supported by many of the most outstanding writers of the country: Tolstoy, Chekhov, Korolenko, Garshin, and Leskov all wrote for Intermediary.

Books were sold unusually cheaply. Reasonable prices and good publicity, in which Repin, Surikov, Kivshenko and other Russian artists were engaged, helped distribution.

=== Conflict with Tolstoy family ===
Chertkov had a troubled relationship with most of the Tolstoy family, and tried actively to destroy the relationship between Tolstoy and his wife Sophia. Tolstoy's final flight, for example, is described as having been greatly influenced by Chertkov. Sophia was especially troubled by what she felt was his hypocritical philosophy: he decried wealth, but had his own fancy estate. His associates lay about her house and ate free and paid no rent and criticized her materialism, while she raised several children and ran the entire business side of Tolstoy's writing (at Tolstoy's wish), which provided a major source of income for Yasnaya Polyana and enabled their lifestyle.

Additionally, Chertkov convinced Tolstoy to sign a secret will and give control of his works to Chertkov instead of Sophia. He then used this control to publish versions of Tolstoy's collected works as he wanted. He also criticized Sophia, discredited her diaries and her own writing, and played up his own relationship with the Count. Chertkov also fostered a positive relationship with the newly formed Soviet state, which he used to suppress Sophia's version of Tolstoy's life story and his relationship with her.

=== Rossosh ===
Chertkov's closest employees were often engaged in editing and drawing up his plans on his farmstead in Rossosh, located in the Ostrogozhsk District. Rossosh had a manor house on top of a hill, as well as an extensive courtyard and subsidiary buildings; at the base of this mountain were three ponds in succession, and behind them 20 desyatina of forest. Soon the small village of Rossosh turned into a large publishing center. From here Chertkov conducted extensive correspondence on the affairs of Intermediary with Russian writers and artists. Tolstoy came to visit his friend here in the spring of 1894.

=== Life in exile ===
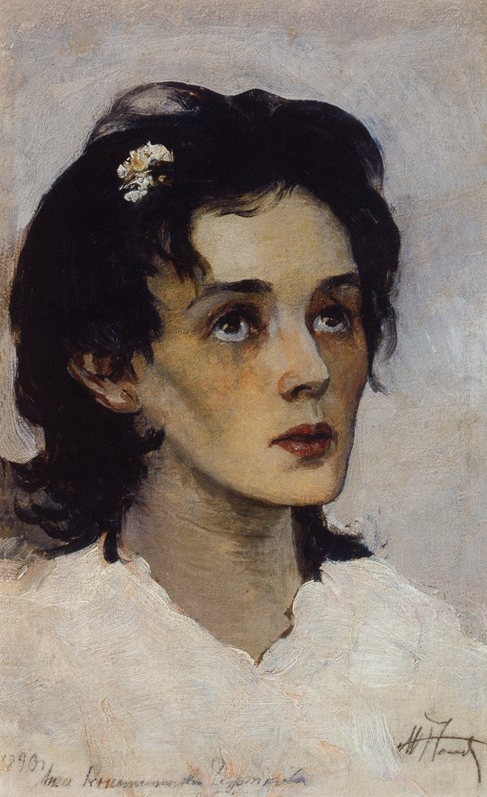
Portrait of Anna Chertkova (1890) by Mikhail Nesterov

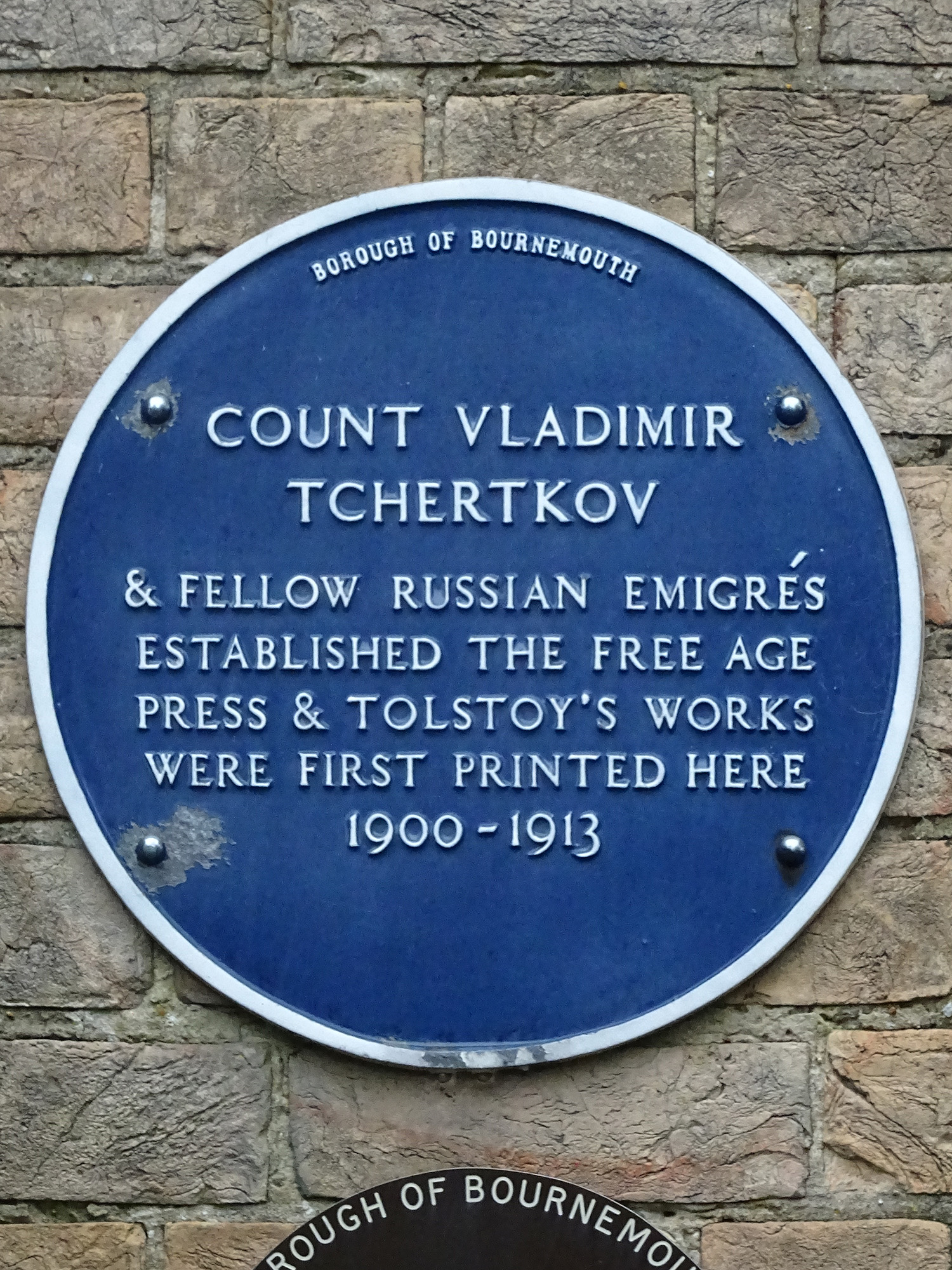
Blue plaque in Bournemouth.

Since the autocracy considered Tolstoyism an enemy, Chertkov left for England in 1897. He was an avid Anglophile like his mother, admired the English tradition of free speech, and was already corresponding with a small collective based at Purleigh in Essex, who were looking to put Tolstoy's ideas into practice. It was to Purleigh, therefore, that Chertkov initially gravitated and it was here that he set up a publishing company, the Free Word Press (Russian: Свободное слово), producing Russian-language versions of Tolstoy's works and kindred literature, much of which was smuggled back into Russia. A separate branch of this business, the Free Age Press, producing English-language texts, was set up in 1900. Chertkov's wife, Anna Konstantinovna, born Dieterichs (1859–1927), was trustee of the Free Word Press and produced several texts for both arms of the business.

The Purleigh group began to split up towards the end of 1900, at which point Chertkov moved with his family and followers to Tuckton House, at Tuckton in Bournemouth, purchased for him by his mother. The group used the defunct waterworks in nearby Iford Lane as their printing works, and continued to churn out Free Word and Free Age Press texts until July 1908, when most of the colony returned with Chertkov to Russia. (The Tsar had granted a pardon to all political exiles three years previously.) The Free Age Press continued to flourish, with a single member of the Tolstoy colony based at Tuckton House as translator and editor, until 1916. There was, of course, less and less appetite for Tolstoy's mainly pacifist writings as Britain drifted into war. Chertkov remained in Russia where, as Tolstoy's literary executor, he was editor-in-chief of one last project: a complete edition of Tolstoy's works in Russian, which ultimately extended to ninety volumes, and was still in motion when Chertkov died in Moscow, after a series of strokes, in 1936. He is buried in Vvedenskoye Cemetery.

== Film ==
Actor Aleksey Petrenko portrayed Chertkov in the 1984 film Lev Tolstoy. Actor Paul Giamatti portrayed Chertkov in the 2009 film The Last Station.

== See also ==
- Tolstoyan
- Nonresistance
- Christian pacifism
- Christian anarchism
- Christian vegetarianism
- Anna Chertkova
