= The Third Coast =

2013 book by Thomas Dyja

The Third Coast: When Chicago Built the American Dream is a 2013 non-fiction book about Chicago by Thomas Dyja, published by Penguin Books.

Dyja noted that, prior to the development of transcontinental aircraft routes in the late 1950s, travelers between the East Coast and West Coast generally traveled through Chicago.

== Reception ==
Scott Turow of The New York Times described the book as "engrossing" and "intricately researched", and had an overall positive reception. Turow argued that there should have been more citations, and that while the title was likely meant to show the prominence of Chicago relative to cities on the two coasts, the title was also "patronizing" in suggesting "that only seaboard cities count".

Bill Savage of the Chicago Tribune stated that the book is "deeply researched" and "ambitious", and praised the text for being "energetic, colorful, vigorous".

Kirkus Reviews stated that it was "readable, richly detailed" and "A valuable contribution".
