= Methland =

2009 book by Nick Reding

Methland: The Death and Life of an American Small Town
- First edition
- Author: Nick Reding
- Language: English
- Genre: Nonfiction
- Publisher: Bloomsbury USA
- Publication date: June 2009
- Publication place: United States
- Media type: Print (Hardcover)
- ISBN: 978-1-59691-650-0
- OCLC: 263147011
- Dewey Decimal: 362.29/9 22
- LC Class: HV5831.I8 R43 2009

Methland: The Death and Life of an American Small Town is a book by Nick Reding which documents the drug culture of Oelwein, Iowa and how it ties into larger issues of rural flight and small town economic decline placed in the historic context of the drug trade, particularly the manufacture and consumption of methamphetamine.

== Summary ==
Between 2005 and 2007 the author traveled through small-town America to study the impact and cause of methamphetamine abuse. His focus is Oelwein, a once thriving small town that started to suffer economically by the end of the century. He analyzes the causes of the rural economic decline: in the context of deregulation and globalization agricultural conglomerates have taken over local businesses. As a result, jobs have disappeared, towns became depopulated, and tax revenue shrunk. Use of meth proliferated in response in the depressed areas. In Iowa, in 2004 it was mostly produced locally using cold medicine as the drug precursor. That year Iowa law enforcement closed 1,370 meth labs. When, after a long delay, cold medicine became more restricted as a precursor material, Mexican operatives moved in. With superlabs in Mexico, drug lords used illegal immigrants hired as cheap labor by agricultural conglomerates as distributors for their networks. Reding notes that the 2006 Combat Meth Act had been watered down by pharmaceutical lobbyists so that local meth labs were also able to recover from their decline and evolve.

== Reception ==
While Reding's book received positive reviews from the New York Times Sunday Book Review and Washington Post's Book World, it was severely criticized by Cedar Rapids columnist Laura Behrens. Scott Martelle from the Los Angeles Times writes that "Reding neither romanticizes nor moralizes. Instead, he opens a window onto a disturbing landscape that we might not want to see, but that we can't avoid."
