= Jay Parini =

American writer and academic (born 1948)

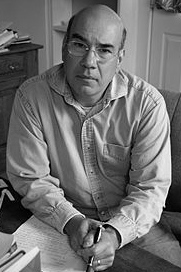
- Jay Parini
- Born: April 2, 1948 (age 78); Pittston, Pennsylvania, U.S.
- Education: Lafayette College; University of St Andrews
- Occupations: Novelist; poet; biographer; academic
- Spouse: Devon Jersild
- Children: 3
- Writing career
- Period: 1972–present
- Website: jayparini.com

Jay Parini (born April 2, 1948) is an American writer and academic. He is known for novels, poetry, biography, and criticism. He has published novels about Leo Tolstoy, Walter Benjamin, Paul the Apostle, and Herman Melville, and a novelized memoir about his road trip with Jorge Luis Borges.

== Early life ==
Parini was born to Leo and Verna Parini in Pittston, Pennsylvania, and brought up in Scranton, Pennsylvania. He graduated from Lafayette College in 1970 and was awarded a doctorate by the University of St Andrews in 1975.

== Academia ==
He taught at Dartmouth College from 1975 to 1982, and at Middlebury College from 1982 to 2025, where he held the D. E. Axinn Professorship of English and Creative Writing and is now Professor Emeritus of English and Creative Writing.

In 1976, Parini co-founded the New England Review with Sydney Lea. Parini was awarded a Guggenheim Fellowship in 1992. He was the Fowler Hamilton Fellow at Christ Church, Oxford University, in 1993–1994. He was a fellow of the Institute for Advanced Studies at the University of London in 2005–2006.

He is a member of the Board of Visitors of Ralston College, a liberal arts college in Savannah that was founded in February, 2010.

== Writing career ==
=== Literary writing ===
Parini has written nine novels, many of which are about the lives of literary icons, and narratives from his own personal life.

His 1990 international best-selling novel The Last Station is about the final months of Leo Tolstoy. It was translated into more than thirty languages, and adapted into an Academy Award-nominated film released in December 2009.

Borges and Me: An Encounter is a 2020 memoir by Jay Parini that recounts a road trip he took as a young man through the Scottish Highlands with the renowned Argentine writer Jorge Luis Borges. The book reconstructs decades-old conversations and events from memory, with Parini describing it as a "novelized memoir."

Parini's historical novel Benjamin's Crossing was a New York Times Notable Book of the year in 1997. It is about the Jewish critic and philosopher Walter Benjamin, and his escape over the Pyrenees from Nazi occupied France into Spain. Michael Lackey notes: "Parini brilliantly dramatizes one of Benjamin’s most important contributions to intellectual history, and it is this contribution that would pave the way for the biographical novel."

The Passages of H.M. (2010) explores the literary great Herman Melville.

His poems have appeared in a wide variety of magazines, including The Atlantic, The New Yorker, and Poetry.

Parini's books of poetry include Singing in Time (1972), Anthracite Country (1982), Town Life (1988), House of Days (1998), The Art of Subtraction: New and Selected Poems (2005), and New and Collected Poems: 1975 - 2015 (2015).

=== Non-fiction ===
Parini has published non-fiction books on a variety of subjects, including biographies of Robert Frost, John Steinbeck, William Faulkner, Gore Vidal and Jesus.

His other works of non-fiction include Theodore Roethke, an American Romantic (1980), Some Necessary Angels: Essays on Writing and Politics (1997), The Art of Teaching (2005), Why Poetry Matters (2008), Promised Land: Thirteen Books That Changed America (2008), The Way of Jesus: Living a Spiritual and Ethical Life (2018), and Robert Frost: Sixteen Poems to Learn By Heart (2024).

External videos
- After Words interview with Parini on Promised Land, January 3, 2009, C-SPAN

External videos
- Booknotes interview with Parini on Robert Frost: A Life, September 12, 1999, C-SPAN

Parini's biography Robert Frost: A Life won the Chicago Tribune Heartland Prize for best non-fiction book of the year in 2000.

His biography One Matchless Time: A Life of William Faulkner was a New York Times Bestseller.

His biography of his longtime friend, the late Gore Vidal, Empire of Self: A Life of Gore Vidal (Doubleday, October 2015), was called "A superbly personal biography that pulsates with intelligence, scholarship, and heart." by Kirkus Reviews. Parini figures prominently in the 2013 documentary film Gore Vidal: The United States of Amnesia.

=== Film adaptations ===
The Last Station was adapted by Michael Hoffman into an Academy Award-nominated film (The Last Station) starring Helen Mirren, Christopher Plummer, James McAvoy, and Paul Giamatti. The film was released in December 2009.

Based on his biography Empire of Self: A Life of Gore Vidal (Doubleday, October 2015), Parini co-wrote the screenplay with director Michael Hoffman of the Netflix original film Gore, starring Kevin Spacey as Vidal, Michael Stuhlbarg as Vidal's gay lover Howard Austen and Douglas Booth as "Jamie", a fictional character created for the movie who is a young British writer. The film was filmed in 2017 and was originally due for release in 2018 but that release was cancelled in November 2017 after it was revealed in late October that Spacey had engaged in sexual misconduct. Almost all of Spacey's other projects at the time were either cancelled or had him recast (and in the case of All the Money in the World, even re-filmed with Christopher Plummer replacing him as J. Paul Getty after filming of the original was already complete) owing to this revelation.

Borges and Me: An Encounter, Parini’s novelized memoir about his 1970 road trip through the Scottish Highlands with Jorge Luis Borges, was adapted into a film of the same name written by Oren Moverman and directed by Marc Turtletaub. Fionn Whitehead plays Parini, with Luis Gnecco as Borges, Alan Cumming as Alastair Reid (poet), and Peter Mullan as George Mackay Brown. Parini, an executive producer of the film, was closely involved in the production and on set every day. It was filmed entirely in Scotland.

=== Journalism and media appearances ===
Parini is a regular contributor to various journals, websites and newspapers, including The Chronicle of Higher Education, CNN, The Daily Beast, The New York Times, and The Guardian (U.K.). He has written for GQ, The Nation, The Huffington Post, and Salon.com.

Parini has made numerous appearances on film, television and radio, including NPR, PBS, CNN, MSNBC, CBS, C-SPAN, and the BBC.

== Iraq War protest ==
Parini, along with Julia Alvarez and Galway Kinnell, was invited to read his poetry at the White House in 2003. However, First Lady Laura Bush canceled the event after learning the poets were intending to protest against the Iraq War. Noelia Rodriguez, a spokeswoman for Mrs. Bush said: “While Mrs. Bush respects the right of all Americans to express their opinions, she, too, has opinions and believes it would be inappropriate to turn a literary event into a political forum.” Parini responded: "For poets to remain silent at a time of national crisis is unconscionable," he said. Fellow poet Julia Alvarez added: "Why be afraid of us, Mrs. Bush? You're married to a scarier fellow." Parini said it was naive for organizers to think he and other poets would check their politics at the door of an event sponsored by the first lady. In response to Mrs. Bush's decision, Parini joined a group of poets that took part in a reading on February 16, 2003, at the Congregational Church in Manchester, Vermont, called "A Poetry Reading in Honor of the Right to Protest as a Patriotic and Historical Tradition". The event was attended by over 700 people, and received national attention, bringing in over 50 reporters and warranting coverage by C-SPAN and 60 Minutes.

In 2010, Parini and Christopher Hitchens debated religion, the invasion of Iraq, and the war on terror at the Pages & Places Book Festival in Scranton, Pennsylvania, which drew more than 2,000 people.

== Personal life ==
Parini is married to the writer and psychologist Devon Jersild; they have three sons.

== Awards ==
Parini has won various fellowships and awards, including a Guggenheim Fellowship in 1992. His novel Benjamin's Crossing was a New York Times Notable Book of the Year in 1997. Parini's Robert Frost: A Life won the Chicago Tribune Heartland Prize for best non-fiction book of the year in 2000. He was awarded the John Ciardi Lifetime Achievement Award by the National Italian American Foundation in 2002. He has received honorary degrees from Lafayette College, Sewanee: The University of the South, and the University of Scranton.

== Works ==
- Singing in Time (1972), poems
- Theodore Roethke, an American Romantic (1979), criticism
- The Love Run (1980), novel
- Anthracite Country (1982), poems
- Bread Loaf Anthology of Contemporary American Poetry (1985), editor with Robert Pack and Sydney Lea
- The Patch Boys (1986), novel
- An Invitation to Poetry (1987)
- The Bread Loaf Anthology of Contemporary American Short Stories (1987), editor with Robert Pack
- A Vermont Christmas (1988)
- Town Life (1988), poems
- The Bread Loaf Anthology of Contemporary American Essays (1989), editor with Robert Pack
- The Last Station: A Novel of Tolstoy's Last Year (1990)
- Richard Eberhart, New and Selected Poems 1930–1990 (1990), editor
- Writers On Writing (1991), with Robert Pack
- Bay of Arrows (1992), novel
- Gore Vidal: Writer Against the Grain (1992), editor
- Poems for a Small Planet: Contemporary American Nature Poetry (1993), editor with Robert Pack
- Columbia History of American Poetry (1994), editor
- Columbia Anthology of American Poetry (1995), editor
- John Steinbeck: A Biography (1995)
- American Identities: Contemporary Multicultural Voices (1996), editor with Robert Pack
- Benjamin's Crossing (1996), novel
- Touchstones : American Poets on a Favorite Poem (1996), editor with Robert Pack
- Some Necessary Angels: Essays on Writing and Politics (1997), essays
- Beyond "The Godfather": Italian American Writers on the Real Italian American Experience (1997), editor with A. Kenneth Ciongoli
- House of Days (1998), poems
- The Norton Book of American Autobiography (1998), editor
- Introspections : American Poets on One of Their Own Poems (1998), editor with Robert Pack
- Robert Frost: A Life (1999)
- American Writers (2000), editor, yearly volumes
- American Writers Classics I (2002) II (2004)
- The Apprentice Lover (2002), novel
- British Writers (2002), editor, yearly
- Contemporary Poetry Of New England (2002), editor with Robert Pack
- Passage to Liberty: The Story of Italian Immigration and the Rebirth of America (2002), with A. Kenneth Ciongoli
- British Writers Classics (2003), editor
- The Oxford Encyclopedia of American Literature (2004), editor
- World Writers in English (2003), editor
- Anthony Quinn's Eye (2004), with Donald Kuspit and Tom Roberts
- One Matchless Time: A Life of William Faulkner (2005)
- The Art of Teaching (2005), criticism
- The Art of Subtraction: New and Selected Poems (2005), poems
- The Wadsworth Anthology of Poetry (2005), editor
- Why Poetry Matters (2008), criticism
- Promised Land: Thirteen Books that Changed America (2008), criticism
- The Passages of H.M. (2011); novel about Herman Melville
- Jesus: The Human Face of God (2013), biography
- Conversations with Jay Parini (2014), edited by Michael Lackey
- Empire of Self: A Life of Gore Vidal (2015), biography
- New and Collected Poems 1975 - 2015 (2016), poetry
- The Way of Jesus: Living a Spiritual and Ethical Life (2018)
- The Damascus Road: A Novel of Saint Paul (2019), novel
- Borges and Me: An Encounter (2020), novelized memoir
- Robert Frost: Sixteen Poems to Learn By Heart (2024), criticism
- Paradise Now: Living the Lord's Prayer (2026)
