= 1970 in poetry =

Nationality words link to articles with information on the nation's poetry or literature (for instance, Irish or France).

== Events ==
- May – "La nuit de la poésie", a poetry reading in Montreal bringing together poets from French Canada to recite before an audience of more than 2,000 in the Théâtre du Gesu, lasting until 7 a.m.
- Release of Tomfoolery, an animated film directed by Joy Batchelor and John Halas, based on the nonsense verse of Edward Lear (especially "The Courtship of the Yonghy-Bonghy-Bo") and Lewis Carroll
- First issue of Tapia (later named the Trinidad & Tobago Review) published
- In the United Kingdom, "My Enemies Have Sweet Voices", a poem by Pete Morgan, is set to music by Al Stewart and included in his "Zero She Flies" album this year.

== Works published in English ==
Listed by nation where the work was first published and again by the poet's native land, if different; substantially revised works listed separately:

=== Australia ===
- Robert Adamson, Canticles on the Skin
- B. Elliott and A. Mitchell, Bards in the Wilderness : Australian Colonial Poetry to 1920, anthology
- Bruce Dawe, "Weapons Training"
- David Malouf, Bicycle and Other Poems
- John Tranter, Parallax, South Head Press

=== Canada ===
- Earle Birney, Rag & Bone Shop. Toronto: McClelland and Stewart).
- Joan Finnigan, It Was Warm and Sunny When We Set Out
- Gail Fox, Dangerous Season
- R.A.D. Ford, The Solitary City, his poems and translations from Russian and Portuguese
- John Glassco, Memoirs of Montparnasse
- Michael Ondaatje:
  - The Collected Works of Billy the Kid: Left-handed Poems (adapted by Ondaatje into a play of the same name in 1973), Toronto: Anansi ISBN 0-88784-018-3; New York: Berkeley, 1975
  - Leonard Cohen (literary criticism), Toronto: McClelland & Stewart
- Joe Rosenblatt, Bumblebee Dithyramb.

==== Anthologies in Canada ====
- Robert Evans, editor, Song to a Seagull, collected Canadian songs and poems
- John Glassco, editor, The Poetry of French Canada in Translation, translated by English-speaking poets, including E. J. Pratt, Al Purdy, Leonard Cohen; and poetic lyrics from recent songs
- Raymond Souster and Douglas Lochhead, eds. New Poems of the Seventies. Ottawa: Oberon Press.
- Raymond Souster and Douglas Lochhead, eds. Made in Canada. Ottawa: Oberon Press, 1970.
- Raymond Souster and Richard Woollatt, eds. Generation Now. Longman Canada.

=== India in English ===
- Shiv Kumar, Articulate Silences (Poetry in English), Calcutta: Writers Workshop, India .
- Keki N. Daruwalla, Under Orion (Poetry in English), Calcutta: Writers Workshop, India . also New Delhi: Harper Collins Publishers India Pvt Ltd.;
- Sukanta Chaudhuri, The Glass King and Other Poems (Poetry in English), Calcutta: Writers Workshop, India .
- Gauri Deshpande, Lost Love (Poetry in English ),
- Suniti Namjoshi, More Poems( Poetry in English ),
- Roshen Alkazi, Seventeen More Poems (Poetry in English), Calcutta: Writers Workshop, India . (see also Seventeen Poems 1965)
- Margaret Chatterjee, Towards the Sun (Poetry in English), Calcutta: Writers Workshop, India .
- Mary Ann Das Gupta, The Peacock Smiles (Poetry in English), Calcutta: Writers Workshop, India .
- N. Prasad, Iconography of Time, Calcutta: Writers Workshop, India .
- Monika Varma, Green Leaves & Gold (Poetry in English), Calcutta: Writers Workshop, India .

=== Ireland ===
- Leland Bardwell, The Mad Cyclist
- Seamus Heaney, Northern Ireland poet published in the United Kingdom:
  - Night Drive, Gilbertson
  - A Boy Driving His Father to Confession, Sceptre Press
- Derek Mahon, Beyond Howth Head, Northern Ireland poet published in the United Kingdom

=== New Zealand ===
- James K. Baxter, Jerusalem Sonnets
- Bill Manhire, Malady
- F. McKay, New Zealand Poetry, scholarship
- Vincent O'Sullivan, editor, An Anthology of Twentieth Century New Zealand Verse
- J. E. Weir, The Poetry of James K. Baxter, a critical study

=== United Kingdom ===
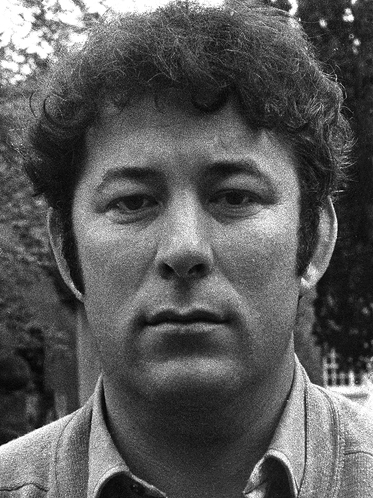
Seamus Heaney in 1970

- Dannie Abse, Selected Poems
- Margaret Atwood, The Journals of Susanna Moodie
- George Barker, At Thurgarton Church
- R. H. Bowden, Poems from Italy
- Frederick Broadie, My Findings
- Michael Dennis Browne, The Wife of Winter
- Charles Causley, Figgie Hobbin
- Donald Davie, Six Epistles to Eva Hesse
- C. Day-Lewis, The Whispering Roots
- Patric Dickinson, More Than Time
- Clifford Dyment, Collected Poems
- D.J. Enright, Selected Poems
- W.S. Graham, Malcolm Mooney's Land
- Ian Hamilton, The Visit
- Tony Harrison, The Loiners
- Seamus Heaney, Northern Ireland poet published in the United Kingdom:
  - Night Drive, Gilbertson
  - A Boy Driving His Father to Confession, Sceptre Press
- Glyn Hughes, Neighbours
- Ted Hughes, Crow
- C. Day-Lewis, The Whispering Roots
- George MacBeth, The Burning Cone
- Norman MacCaig, A Man in My Position
- Hugh MacDiarmid, Selected Poems
- Sorley MacLean, George Campbell Hay, William Neill and Stuart MacGregor, Four Points of a Saltire (includes some poems in Scottish Gaelic)
- Derek Mahon, Beyond Howth Head Northern Ireland poet published in the United Kingdom
- Walter de la Mare, The Complete Poems of Walter de la Mare
- Stuart Montgomery, Circe
- Brian Patten, The Homecoming
- Christopher Pilling, Snakes and Girls, won the new Poets Award sponsored by Leeds university and the Yorkshire Post
- Peter Porter, The Last of England
- Burns Singer, Collected Poems (posthumous)
- Iain Crichton Smith, Selected Poems
- Charles Tomlinson, The Way of a World
- John Wain, Letters to Five Artists
- Ted Walker, The Night Bathers
- Hugo Williams, Sugar Daddy
- Mary Wilson (wife of Prime Minister Harold Wilson), Selected Poems, "easily the 'best selling'" poetry book of the year.
- Clive Young, Ashdragons, Flowerdeath and Sun

==== Anthologies in the United Kingdom ====
- Alan Bold, editor, The Penguin Book of Socialist Verse
- Peter Robins, editor, Doves for the Seventies
- Edward Lucie-Smith, editor, British Poetry since 1945, Penguin (2nd edition 1985)
- F.E.S. Finn, editor, Poems of the Sixties
- Howard Sergeant, editor, Poetry of the 1940s

=== United States ===
- A.R. Ammons, Uplands
- John Ashbery, The Double Dream of Spring
- Paul Blackburn:
  - The Assassination of President McKinley
  - Three Dreams and an Old Poem
  - Gin: Four Journal Pieces
- Louise Bogan, A Poet's Alphabet
- Philip Booth, Margins
- Stanley Burnshaw, The Seamless Web
- Gwendolyn Brooks, Family Pictures
- Raymond Carver, Winter Insomnia
- J. P. Clark, Casualties: Poems 1966–68, Nigerian poet published in the United States
- Clark Coolidge, Space, Harper & Row
- L. Sprague de Camp, Demons and Dinosaurs
- James Dickey, The Eye-Beaters, Blood, Victory, Madness, Buckhead and Mercy
- Ed Dorn:
  - Gunslinger I & II, Fulcrum Press
  - Songs Set Two: a Short Count, Frontier Press, ISBN 978-0-686-05052-0
- Michael S. Harper, Dear John, Dear Coultrane, nominated for the National Book Award
- John Hollander, Images of Voice, criticism
- David Ignatow, Poems: 1934-1969
- LeRoi Jones, It's Nation Time
- Shirley Kaufman, the Floor Keeps Turning
- Denise Levertov, Relearning the Alphabet
- William Meredith, Earth Walk
- W. S. Merwin:
  - The Carrier of Ladders, New York: Atheneum (awarded the Pulitzer Prize for Poetry in 1971)
  - Signs, with graphics by A. D. Moore; Iowa City, Iowa: Stone Wall Press
- Lorine Niedecker, My Life by Water: Collected Poems, 1936-1968 (Fulcrum Press)
- Michael Ondaatje, The Collected Works of Billy the Kid
- Ezra Pound's Drafts and Fragments of Cantos CX to CXVII
- Mark Strand, Darker, Canadian native living in and published in the United States
- May Swenson, Iconographs
- Mona Van Duyn, To See, To Take
- Reed Whittemore, Fifty Poems Fifty
- William Carlos Williams, Imaginations (posthumous)

=== Other in English ===
- J. P. Clark, Casualties: Poems 1966–68, Nigerian poet published in the United States

== Works published in other languages ==
Listed by nation where the work was first published and again by the poet's native land, if different; substantially revised works listed separately:

=== Arabic language ===
- Nizar Qabbani, Syrian:
  - Savage Poems
  - Book of Love
  - 100 Love Letters

=== Denmark ===
- Thorkild Bjørnvig, a book of "collected or selected works"
- Regin Dahl, Ærinde uden betydning
- Ivan Malinovski, a book of "collected or selected works"
- Jess Ørnsbo, a book of "collected or selected works"
- Klaus Rifbjerg, Mytologi, Denmark

=== French language ===
==== Canada ====
- Gaston Miron, L'Homme Rapaillé
- Yves Préfontaine:
  - Débâcle
  - À l'Orée des travaux
- Fernand Dumont, Parler de septembre
- Raoul Duguay, Manifeste de l'Infonie
- Nicole Brossard, Suite logique
- Louis-Philippe Hébert, Les Mangeurs de terre

==== France ====
- M. Béalu, La Nuit nous garde
- Alain Bosquet and Pierre Seghers, Poèmes de l'année
- L. Brauquier, Feux d'épaves
- Mohammed Dib, Formulaires
- Emily Dickinson, Poésies complètes, translated from the original English by Guy Jean Forgue; Aubier-Flammarion
- Pierre Emmanuel, pen name of Noël Mathieu, Jacob
- Andre Frenaud, Depuis toujours déja
- Eugene Guilleveic, Paroi
- Michel Leiris, Mots sans mémoire
- C. Le Quintrec, La Marche des arbres
- M. Manoll, Incarnada
- J.L. Moreau, Sous le masque des mots
- J. Tardieu, Poèmes à jouer
- Vandercammen, Horizon de la vigie

=== Germany ===
- Paul Celan, Lightduress (Lichtzwang, Romanian, writing in German)

=== Hebrew ===
- M. Temkin, Shirai Yerushalayim
- A. Broides, Tahana ve-Derech
- Z. Gilead, Or Hozer
- Dan Pagis, Gilgul ("Transformations")
- I. Shalev, Naar Shav Min ha-Tzava
- Abba Kovner, Hupahba-Midbar
- T. Carmi, Davar Ahed
- Avot Yeshurun, Ze Shaim ha-Sefere

=== Italy ===
- Carmelo Bene, L'orecchio mancante
- Dino Buzzati, Poema a fumetti
- Alfredo Giuliani, Il tautofono
- Sandro Penna, Tutte le poesie
- Nelo Risi, Di certe cose
- Maria Luisa Spaziani, L'occhio del ciclone
- Giovanni Testori, Erodiade

=== Norway ===
- Rolf Jacobsen, Headlines
- Stein Mehren, Aurora
- Ragnvald Skrede, Lauvfall
- Simen Skjønsberg, Flyttedag
- Tarjei Vesaas, Liv ved straumen (posthumous)

=== Portuguese language ===
==== Brazil ====
- Augusto de Campos, Equivocábulos, collection of "semantic-visual texts, photo-poems, and 'Viagem via linguagem', a collapsible environment-poem resembling an architect's model"
- Affonso Avila, Código de Minas
- Silviano Santiago, Salto

=== Russian ===
- Andrei Voznesenski, The Shadow of Sound
- Y. Smelyakov, December
- Boris Slutski, Tales for Today
- Evgeni Vinokurov, Shows
- Leonid Martynov, Peoples' Names
- Leonid Vasilyev, Ognevistsa
- Evgeni Yevtushenko, a collection, including some new poems and omitting some "controversial earlier ones"

=== Spanish language ===
==== Spain ====
- Jorge Guillén, Obra poética
- José Caballero Bonald, Vivar para contarlo ("Live to Tell It"), including "Zauberlehrling"

==== Peru ====
- Washington Delgado, Un mundo dividado
- C.G. Belli, Sextinas
- J.G. Rose, Informe al rey
- M. Martos, Cuaderno de quejas y contentamientos
- C. Bustamante, El nombre de las cosas

==== Elsewhere in Latin America ====
- Julio Cortázar, Último round, miscellany of stories, poems, essays and collage games (Argentina)
- Alaíde Foppa, Elogio de mi cuerpo ("Praise of my body") (Guatemalan poet published in Mexico)
- Alberto Girri, Antología temática (Argentina)
- Alberto Vanasco, Canto rodado (Argentina)
- I. López Vallecillo, Puro asombro (El Salvador)
- Ernesto Cardenal, Salmos (Nicaragua)
- R. Fernández Retamar, Que veremos arder (Cuba)
- Nicanor Parra, Obra gruesa (Chile)
- Enrique Lihn, La musiquilla de las pobres esferas (Chile)

=== Sweden ===
- Werner Aspenström, Inre ("Inner")
- Gören Sonnevi, Det Måste gå ("It Must Be Possible")
- Maja Ekelöf, Rapport från en skurhink ("Report from a Scrub Bucket")
- Henry Olsson, Vinlövsranka och hagtornskrans, a study of the poet Gustaf Fröding (died 1911)

=== Yiddish ===
==== Israel ====
- Abraham Sutzkever, Ripened Faces
- Jacob Shargel, Sunny Doorsteps
- Arye Shamri, Song in the Barn
- Dovid Rodin, Young and Younger, for young readers
- Leyzer Aykhenrand, Thirst for Duration

==== United States ====
- Joseph Rubinstein, Exodus from Europe, third volume of a narrative trilogy
- Wolf Pasmanik, My Poems
- Kadia Molodowsky, Marzipans, for children and adults
- Moshe Shifris, Under One Roof

==== Elsewhere ====
- Melech Ravitch, Post Scriptus (Canada)
- Jacob Sternberg, Poem and Ballad on the Carpathians (France)
- Izi Kharik, With Body and Life (Russia)

=== Other languages ===
- Luo Fu, River Without Banks, Chinese (Taiwan)
- Rituraj, Kitna Thora Waqt; India, Hindi-language
- Nirmalendu Goon, Huliya; Pakistan (Now Bangladesh), Bengali-language

== Awards and honors ==
=== Australia ===
- Grace Leven Prize for Poetry: Bruce Beaver, Letters to Live Poets

=== Canada ===
- See 1970 Governor General's Awards for a complete list of winners and finalists for those awards.

=== United Kingdom ===
- Cholmondeley Award: Kathleen Raine, Douglas Livingstone, Edward Brathwaite
- Eric Gregory Award: Helen Frye, Paul Mills, John Mole, Brian Morse, Alan Perry, Richard Tibbitts
- Queen's Gold Medal for Poetry: Roy Fuller

=== United States ===
- Consultant in Poetry to the Library of Congress (later the post would be called "Poet Laureate Consultant in Poetry to the Library of Congress"): William Stafford appointed this year.
- Pulitzer Prize for Poetry: Richard Howard, Untitled Subjects
- National Book Award for Poetry: Elizabeth Bishop, The Complete Poems
- Fellowship of the Academy of American Poets: Howard Nemerov

=== France ===
- Prix Max Jacob: Daniel Boulanger for Tchadiennes and Retouches
- French Academy's Grand Prix de Poèsie: Jean Follain

=== Soviet Union ===
- Lenin Prize: Nikolai Tikhonov

== Births ==
- June 14 – Brian Bilston, born Paul Millicheap, English writer, "the poet laureate of Twitter"
- February 27 – Rachel Mann, English trans woman poet and Anglican priest
- September 10 – Phaswane Mpe (died 2004), South African novelist and poet
- September 16 – Nick Sagan, American poet, novelist and screenwriter
- September 24 – Gemma Moraleja Paz, Spanish poet and novelist
- Also:
  - Malika Booker, British poet
  - Victoria Chang, American poet
  - Tim Kendall, English poet, editor, critic and academic
  - David Roderick, American poet
  - Faruk Šehić, Bosnian poet and fiction writer
  - Brenda Shaughnessy, Japanese-born American poet

== Deaths ==
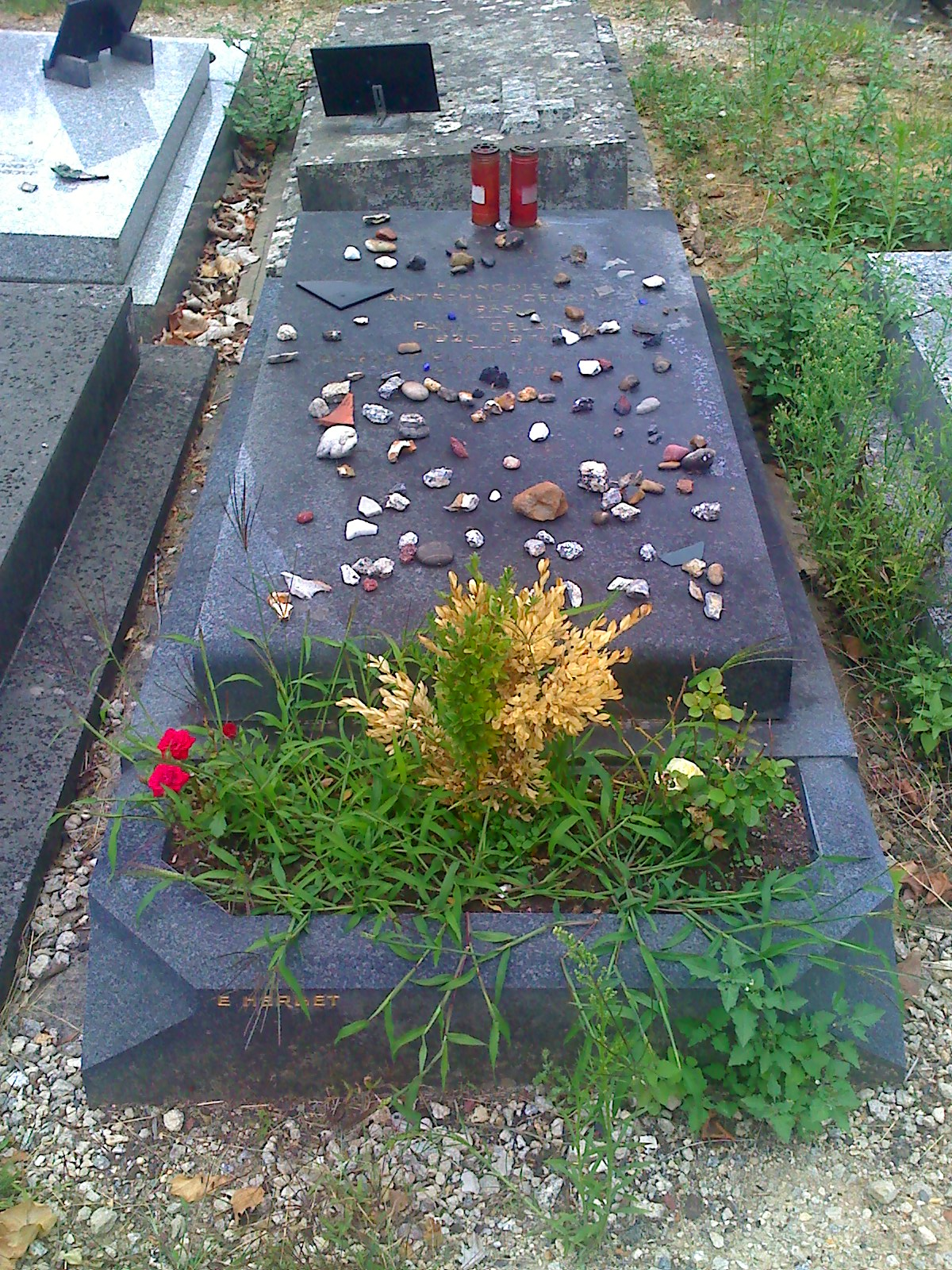
The grave of Paul Celan at the Thiais cemetery near Paris

Birth years link to the corresponding "[year] in poetry" article:

- January 10 – Charles Olson, 59 (born 1910), American poet, of cancer
- January 15 – Leah Goldberg, 58 (born 1911), Israeli poet who wrote in Hebrew
- January 24 – Caresse Crosby, also known as "Mary Phelps Jacob", 78 (born 1891), American poet and New York socialite, who, in 1927, founded Black Sun Press with her husband Harry Crosby (also a poet) and who in 1910 invented the first modern bra to receive a patent and gain wide acceptance
- February 4 – Louise Bogan, 72 (born 1897), American poet, United States Poet Laureate
- February 19 – Edsel Ford, 41 (born 1928), American poet
- March 26 – Rosa Zagnoni Marinoni, 82 (born 1888), American poet
- March 28 – Nathan Alterman, 59 (born 1910), Israeli poet, journalist and translator
- March 29 – Vera Brittain, 76 (born 1893) English novelist and poet
- about April 20 – Paul Celan, 49 (born 1920), Romanian-born poet who wrote in German and became a French citizen, suicide
- May 12 – Nelly Sachs, 78 (born 1891), German-Swedish poet and dramatist who won the Nobel Prize for Literature in 1966
- June 2 – Giuseppe Ungaretti, 82 (born 1888), Italian modernist poet, journalist, essayist, critic and academic
- June 18 – N. P. van Wyk Louw, 64 (born 1906), South African Afrikaans poet and critic
- September 23 – John Gawsworth, 58 (born 1912), English poet, anthologist, Fitzrovian and King Juan I of Redonda
- September 28 – John Dos Passos, 74 (born 1896), American novelist, poet and artist
- November 25 – Yukio Mishima 三島 由紀夫, pen name of Kimitake Hiraoka 平岡 公威, 45 (born 1925), Japanese author, poet and playwright, by public ritual suicide
- December 11 – Arthur Nortje, 27 (born 1942), South African poet, of a drug overdose
- December 31 – Lorine Niedecker, 67 (born 1903), American Objectivist poet

== Notes and references ==
- 1971 Britannica Book of the Year (covering events of 1970), "Literature" article and "Obituaries of 1970" article; source of many of the books in the "Works published" list and some deaths.
- Lal, P., Modern Indian Poetry in English: An Anthology & a Credo, Calcutta: Writers Workshop, second edition, 1971 (however, on page 597 an "editor's note" states contents "on the following pages are a supplement to the first edition" and is dated "1972"); hereafter: "P. Lal (1971)"

== See also ==
- Poetry
- List of poetry awards
- List of years in poetry
