= W. D. Snodgrass =

American poet (1926–2009)

- Born: William De Witt Snodgrass; January 5, 1926; Beaver Falls, Pennsylvania, US
- Died: January 13, 2009 (aged 83); Erieville, New York, US
- Education: Geneva College; University of Iowa (BA, MA, MFA)
- Occupations: Poet, professor
- Spouses: Lila Hank (m. 1946; div. 1953); Janice Ferguson Wilson (m. 1954; div. 1966); Camille Rykowski (m. 1967; div. 1978); Kathleen Brown (m. 1985)
- Children: 2
- Writing career
- Pen name: W. D. Snodgrass; S. S. Gardons
- Notable work: Heart's Needle
- Notable awards: Pulitzer Prize for Poetry (1960)
- Literary movement: Confessional poetry

William De Witt Snodgrass (January 5, 1926 – January 13, 2009) was an American poet who also wrote under the pseudonym S. S. Gardons. He won the 1960 Pulitzer Prize for Poetry.

== Life ==
Snodgrass was born on January 5, 1926, in Beaver Falls, Pennsylvania, to Bruce De Witt, an accountant, and Jesse Helen (Murchie) Snodgrass. The family lived in Wilkinsburg, but drove to Beaver Falls for his birth since his grandfather was a doctor in the town. Eventually the family moved to Beaver Falls and Snodgrass graduated from the local high school in 1943. He then attended Geneva College until 1944 when he was drafted into the United States Navy. After demobilization in 1946, Snodgrass transferred to the University of Iowa and enrolled in the Iowa Writers' Workshop, originally intending to become a playwright but eventually joining the poetry workshop which was attracting as teachers some of the finest poetic talents of the day, among them John Berryman, Randall Jarrell and Robert Lowell. He received a Bachelor of Arts degree in 1949, a Master of Arts degree in 1951, and a Master of Fine Arts degree in 1953.

Snodgrass was known to friends throughout his life as "De", pronounced "dee", but only published using his initials. He had a long and distinguished academic career, having taught at Cornell (1955–57), Rochester (1957–58), Wayne State (1959–68), Syracuse (1968–77), Old Dominion (1978–79), and the University of Delaware. He retired from teaching in 1994 to devote himself full-time to his writing. This included autobiographical sketches, essays, and the critical verse "deconstructions" of De/Compositions. He died in his home in Madison County, New York, aged 83, four-months after being diagnosed with lung cancer, and was survived by his fourth wife, writer Kathleen Snodgrass.

Snodgrass had married his first wife, Lila Jean Hank, in 1946, by whom he had a daughter, Cynthia Jean. Their marriage ended in divorce in 1953 and it was the separation from his daughter as a result that became the subject of his first collection, Heart's Needle. The following year Snodgrass married his second wife, Janice Marie Ferguson Wilson. Together they have a son, Russell Bruce, and a stepdaughter, Kathy Ann Wilson. Divorcing again in 1966, he married his third wife, Camille Rykowski in 1967 but this ended in 1978. His fourth marriage to Kathleen Ann Brown was in 1985.

== Literary career ==
Snodgrass's first poems appeared in 1951, and throughout the 1950s he published in magazines such as Botteghe Oscure, Partisan Review, The New Yorker, The Paris Review and The Hudson Review. In 1957, five sections from a sequence entitled "Heart's Needle" were included in Hall, Pack and Simpson's anthology, New Poets of England and America.

By the time Heart's Needle was published as a book, in 1959, Snodgrass had won The Hudson Review Fellowship in Poetry and an Ingram Merrill Foundation Poetry Prize. Heart's Needle earned him a citation from the Poetry Society of America, a grant from the National Institute of Arts, and the 1960 Pulitzer Prize in Poetry. It has been said that Heart's Needle inaugurated confessional poetry. Snodgrass disliked the term.. His confessional work was to influence his contemporaries, including Robert Lowell.

Snodgrass was one of the founders of the Creative Writing program at Syracuse. One of his students, the poet Stephen Dunn, has written of his 1969-70 experience at Syracuse that, "We had come to study with Philip Booth, Donald Justice, W.D. Snodgrass, George P. Elliott, arguably the best group of writer-teachers that existed at the time."

The label of confessional poet affected his work and its reception (he was perceived by some to have "wrecked his career"). His later work moved in new directions: The Führer Bunker cycle of poems, monologues by Adolf Hitler and his circle in the closing days of the Third Reich, began appearing as a "poem in progress" in 1977 and was finally completed in 1995. An adaptation of these for the stage was performed in the 1980s. Snodgrass satirized his former confessional style in a series of poems written in response to DeLoss McGraw's surrealistic paintings, a collaboration that eventually grew into a partnership.

== Bibliography ==
Poetry

- 1959: Heart's Needle
- 1968: After Experience: Poems and Translations
- 1968: Leaving the Motel
- 1970: Remains
- 1977: The Führer Bunker: A Cycle of Poems in Progress
- 1979: If Birds Build with Your Hair
- 1981: These Trees Stand
- 1982: Heinrich Himmler
- 1983: The Boy Made of Meat
- 1983: Magda Goebbels
- 1984: D. D. Byrde Callying Jennie Wrenn
- 1986: The Kinder Capers
- 1986: A Locked House
- 1987: Selected Poems: 1957–1987
- 1988: W. D.'s Midnight Carnival
- 1989: The Death of Cock Robin
- 1993: Each in His Season
- 1995: The Führer Bunker: The Complete Cycle
- 2006: Not for Specialists: New and Selected Poems

Prose

- In Radical Pursuit: Critical Essays and Lectures (1975)
- After-images: Autobiographical Sketches (1999)
- To Sound Like Yourself: Essays on Poetry (2002)

Drama

- The Führer Bunker (1981)

Anthologies

- Gallows Song (1967)
- Six Troubadour Songs (1977)
- Traditional Hungarian Songs (1978)
- Six Minnesinger Songs (1983)
- The Four Seasons (1984)
- Five Romanian Ballads, Cartea Romaneasca (1993)
- Selected Translations (1998)
- De/Compositions: 101 Good Poems Gone Wrong (2001)

== Sources ==
- W. D. Snodgrass (Twayne's United States authors series; TUSAS 316) by Paul L. Gaston
- The Poetry of W. D. Snodgrass: Everything Human (Under Discussion) by Stephen Haven (Editor)
- No music, no poem: Interviews with W.R. Moses & W. D. Snodgrass by Roy Scheele
- W. D. Snodgrass: A Bibliography by William White
- Tuned and Under Tension: The Recent Poetry of W. D. Snodgrass (edited by Philip Raisor)
- W. D. Snodgrass and The Führer bunker: an interview, Gaston
- The First Confessionalist, an interview with Ernest Hilbert in Contemporary Poetry Review
- An Examination of "Discourses on the apostolical succession", by W. D. Snodgrass, D.D by William Johnson
- American Writers: A Collection of Literary Biographies, Supplement Vi, Don Delillo to W. D. Snodgrass, edited by Jay Parini
- Everything Human: On the Poetry of W. D. Snodgrass by Richard Howard
