= Alaev =

Alaev, Alayev (masculine), Alaeva, Alayeva (feminine) is a surname. It may be a Russian-language surname. Notable people with the surname include:

- Eduard Alayev (born 1967), Israeli former Olympic sport shooter
- Kateryna Alaeva (born 1979), Ukrainian prima ballerina
- Leonid Alaev (1932–2023), Soviet and Russian historian and indologist
- Serhiy Alayev, Ukrainian footballer

== See also ==
- Aliev
