= George P. Elliott =

American writer (1918–1980)

- Born: George Paul Elliott; June 16, 1918; Knightstown, Indiana
- Died: May 3, 1980 (aged 61); New York City, New York
- Occupation: Writer
- Spouse: Mary Emma Jeffress
- Children: Nora Catherine Elliott

George P. Elliott (June 16, 1918 – May 3, 1980) was an American poet, novelist, short story writer, and essayist.

== Life ==
Elliott was born and raised on a dairy farm outside Knightstown, Indiana. When he was ten, his father lost the farm in a mortgage foreclosure and moved the family to Riverside, California, when he bought a carob farm. He later said that growing up in the desert shaped his life considerably: "Nobody lived nearby, and I could not afford to visit people far away. I was thrown back on books and I read enormously--mostly books from the public library." He also said that his father had a strong influence on him as a writer: "He was a very religious, unsocial, profoundly moral man, and because I couldn't have a normal adolescent social life, these qualities impressed themselves upon me very strongly indeed and have considerably modified what I have written."

He attended the University of California, Berkeley, earning a B.A. in English in 1939 and an M.A. in 1941. He married Mary Emma Jeffress on 18 January 1941, and they had one daughter, Nora Catherine Elliott, born on 3 February 1943. After working a variety of jobs during World War II, he received an appointment to the faculty of Saint Mary's College of California in 1947. He later said the experience had a profound effect upon him: "Dealing with the students, nearly all of them Catholics ... I was enormously influenced.... I found the richness and complexity and subtlety of Catholicism powerfully attractive." The San Francisco Bay Area also played a significant role in his fiction, serving as the setting for three of his four novels (Parktilden Village, David Knudsen, and In the World) and a number of his short stories ("A Family Matter", "Children of Ruth").

His first published short story, "The NRACP" (the acronym stood for "National Relocation Authority: Colored Persons"), appeared in The Hudson Review in 1949. A satirical dystopia about the establishment of extermination camps for African Americans, the story offended a number of his acquaintances, while others failed to recognize it as a satire. He went on to publish a number of well-regarded short stories in The Hudson Review, The Magazine of Fantasy & Science Fiction and other journals during the next decade that were later collected in his book, Among the Dangs (1961).

In 1955, he took a job on the faculty at Cornell University, and in 1957, he joined the faculty at Barnard College. He won a Hudson Review Fellowship in 1956 and a residence at the Yaddo writer's colony in 1957. Around the same time, his wife became a managing editor at The Hudson Review and she later replaced William Arrowsmith as editor in 1960. He published his first book of fiction, the novel Parktilden Village, in 1958. Reviewing the book for Commentary, Robert Brustein called it "a satiric nose-thumbing at the age of the social sciences and ... a plea for the restoration of certain values which the permissive disciplines have squeezed out of the human spirit."

In 1960, he moved to the Iowa Writers' Workshop at the University of Iowa, where he taught alongside Philip Roth, R. V. Cassill, and W. D. Snodgrass. He returned to the Bay Area in 1962, teaching first at University of California, Berkeley and then at St Mary's. In 1963, he took a post in the Creative Writing Program at Syracuse University, where he remained until his death in 1980 just days ahead of his planned retirement date. Elliot was one of the founders of the Creative Writing program at Syracuse. One of his students, the poet Stephen Dunn, has written of his 1969-70 experience at Syracuse that, "We had come to study with Philip Booth, Donald Justice, W.D. Snodgrass, George P. Elliott, arguably the best group of writer-teachers that existed at the time." He won a number of fellowships during his career, including a D. H. Lawrence fellowship in 1962, a Ford Foundation fellowship in 1965, and Guggenheim fellowships in 1961 and 1970.

His short story collection, Among the Dangs, won the Indiana Authors' Day Award in 1962. His second novel, David Knudsen (1962), was called "A luminous and important novel that deserves much better than the perfunctory or hostile reviews that it received when it was published six months ago" in a long review by Theodore Solotaroff in 'Commentary'. Its story centered on the title character, the son of a nuclear scientist, who suffers from radiation sickness due to exposure to fallout a hydrogen bomb test his father had been responsible for. Solotaroff wrote that, "To read David Knudsen is to realize how little has been done with this subject [living in the nuclear age] until now."

By the time his third and longest novel, In the World, was published in 1965, however, Elliott's work was beginning to fall rapidly in its assessment by critics. Reviewing the book in the New York Times, Charles Poore wrote that its "execution is fogged in great blurs of words, words, words"', and in the same paper, Elizabeth Janeway judged that "Mr. Elliott has stirred a lot of things together here, but he hasn't cooked them at a high enough temperature to melt them into one." Elliott must have taken some of this criticism to heart, because his fourth and final novel, Muriel (1972) was his shortest. In his New York Times review, Geoffrey Wolff wrote that "It is not like any book I have seen for quite some time: of grand ambition and reach, of ruthlessly suppressed execution" and praised the writer for "keeping his prose tightly buttoned, his effects in decorous control."

Throughout his working life, Elliott devoted almost every morning to writing: "Even when he visited friends for a weekend he insisted in spending the morning at a borrowed desk," Brustein remembered. At the time of his death, he was working on a very long historical novel, Michael of Byzantium, that he was adapting from an earlier play, "Michael the God", that Brustein had rejected. "It can be argued that he had not fulfilled his early promise as a writer of fiction, but nothing George wrote was without value, and his essays remained as percipient and brave as ever," Brustein later wrote. His autobiographical essays, many of them, such as "A Piece of Lettuce", "A Brown Pen", and "Growing Up on a Carob Plantation", based on his experiences as a teenager on his family's farm outside Riverside, have been called "among the most original and impressive of all his literary production." Brustein agreed, finding them "even more congenial than his fiction; they were certainly more original, because in them George was effectively developing a new prose form." David J. Gordon wrote that Elliott's best essays combine "cultural-literary comment with a kind of personal reminiscence that offers us a few glimpses into the role his temperament played in the formation of his opinions." Not everyone shared this view, however: reviewing A Piece of Lettuce in the New York Times, John Berryman called it an "agreeable and rather unimportant book."

Elliott died suddenly, of a heart attack, while visiting New York City on 3 May 1980.

== Works ==
Novels

- Parktilden Village, Boston: Beacon Press, 1958
- David Knudsen,
- In the World, New York: Viking, 1965
- Muriel, New York, Dutton, 1972

Short Stories

- Among the Dangs: Ten Short Stories, New York: Viking, 1961
- An Hour of Last Things and Other Stories, New York: Harper & Row, 1968

Poetry

- Fever and Chills, Iowa City, Stone Wall Press, 1961
- 14 Poems, Landham, MD: Goosetree Press, 1964
- From the Berkeley Hills, New York: Harper & Row, 1969
- Young Woman's Song, Highland Park, Michigan: The Red Hanrahan Press, 1972
- Reaching, Northridge, CA: Santa Susana Press, 1979

Essays

- A Piece of Lettuce: Personal Essays on Books, Beliefs, American Places, and Growing Up in a Strange Country, New York: Random House, 1964
- Conversions: Literature and the Modernist Deviation, New York: E. P. Dutton & Co., 1971

As Editor

- Fifteen modern American poets, New York, Holt, Rinehart and Winston, 1956
- Types of Prose Fiction, New York: Random House, 1964
- Syracuse Poems 1963-1969, Syracuse, NY: Syracuse University Press, 1970
- Themes in World Literature: A guide for writing about literature, Boston: Houghton Mifflin, 1970

Anthology

- A George P. Elliott Reader: Selected Poetry and Prose, edited by Robert Pack and Jay Parini, Hanover, VT: University Press of New England, 1992
