= Vanasco =

Vanasco is a surname. Notable people with the surname include:

- Alberto Vanasco (1925–1993), Argentine writer and poet
- Jeannie Vanasco, American writer
- Jennifer Vanasco (born 1971), American journalist
- Ricky Vanasco (born 1998), American baseball player
