= No Mountains Poetry Project =

- Status: not currently active
- Founded: 1975
- Founder: Amazingrace Coffeehouse, TriQuarterly Magazine, Whole Earth Center, The Ravine Press
- Country of origin: USA
- Headquarters location: Evanston, IL
- Publication types: broadside series
- Nonfiction topics: literary performance and the book arts

The No Mountains Poetry Project was a unique and popular interdisciplinary program of workshops, live readings, recordings, and letterpress broadsides located in Evanston, Illinois during the 1970s. Its objectives were to bring poets and writers together with academic and non-academic audiences in non-traditional settings, to encourage poetry-as-performance, and to collaborate with the book and poster arts.

The project was the result of a collaboration between TriQuarterly magazine, Amazingrace Coffeehouse, The Whole Earth Center, and the Ravine Press.

== Participants ==
The series featured leading practitioners in a wide variety of styles. Diane di Prima and Anne Waldman represented the Beat tradition. Ed Dorn was a member of the Black Mountain poets. John Hawkes was a proponent of postmodern literature. Robert Coover and William H. Gass worked in the style that has come to be known as metafiction. And Charles Bukowski has been characterized as a rock star “pulp” writer. Poet essayist, and short-story writer Tess Gallagher and poet Laura Jensen provided strong voices from the Pacific Northwest.

Several of the No Mountains Poetry Project participants went on to achieve Poet Laureate status. Diane di Prima was appointed Poet Laureate of San Francisco, Mark Strand was the fourth US Poet Laureate and Galway Kinnell was Poet Laureate for Vermont.

== Locations ==
The workshops took place on the campus of Northwestern University, primarily for the academic community. The performances for the larger community took place either at Amazingrace Coffeehouse (845 Main St., Evanston, IL) or the Whole Earth Center (530 Dempster St., Evanston, IL). The Charles Bukowski reading sold out all 400 seats available. The Whole Earth Center served as distributor for the authors’s books and the broadsides.

== Broadsides ==
The limited edition broadsides were printed by The Ravine Press on a No. 4 Vandercook proof press on Arches paper. The color illustrations were done by Amazingrace using the hand-pulled screen printing process. Print runs varied from 150-199. Advisors were The Art Institute of Chicago on paper and ink, and the Newberry Library on typography. Complete sets are available for viewing at the New York Public Library Special Collections and the Northwestern University Library Archives, Amazingrace Coffeehouse collection.

== Performance & Publication History ==
| Date | Poet/Writer | Broadside Title | Edition Notes | Reading Location |
|---|---|---|---|---|
| Oct 1975 | Anne Waldman | Dance Song | 13” x 20”; 150 signed and numbered | Amazingrace |
| Oct 1975 | Mark Strand | From Two Notebooks | 10” x 20”; 150 signed and numbered | Amazingrace |
| Nov 1975 | Robert Coover | The Fallguy’s Faith | 13” x 20”; 150 signed and numbered | Amazingrace |
| Nov 1975 | Charles Bukowski | winter | 13” x 20”; 199 signed and numbered, with additional cartoon illustrations by the author | Amazingrace |
| Jan 1976 | John Hawkes | Travesty | 13” x 20”; 150 signed and numbered | Amazingrace |
| Feb 1976 | Diane di Prima | The Bell Tower | 13” x 20”; 150 signed and numbered | Amazingrace |
| Feb 1976 | Ed Dorn | Hello, La Jolla | 13” x 20”; 150 signed and numbered | Amazingrace |
| Apr 1976 | William H. Gass | Mad Meg in the Maelstrom | 13” x 20”; 150 signed and numbered | Amazingrace |
| Apr 1976 | Galway Kinnell | Saint Francis and the Sow | 13” x 20”; 150 signed and numbered | Amazingrace |
| May 1976 | Tess Gallagher | | | Amazingrace |
| May 1976 | Laura Jensen | | | Amazingrace |
| Sept 1976 | Mark Strand | My Son | 13” x 20”; 150 signed and numbered | Amazingrace |
| Nov 1976 | Peter Michelson | | | Whole Earth Center |
| Dec 1976 | Eugene Wildman | | | Whole Earth Center |
