= Robert Mezey =

American writer and academic (1935–2020)

Robert Mezey (February 28, 1935 – April 25, 2020) was an American poet, critic and academic. He was also a noted translator, in particular from Spanish, having translated with Richard Barnes the collected poems of Borges.

He was born in Philadelphia, and attended Kenyon College as a contemporary of E. L. Doctorow and James Wright; after a time and serving in the army he finished in 1959 an undergraduate degree at the University of Iowa. Having worked for a while, he became a graduate student at Stanford University. Then he began teaching at Case Western Reserve University, in 1963. During a year at Franklin and Marshall College he was for a time suspended after an accusation of inciting students to burn draft cards. After holding other positions, he settled in 1976 at Pomona College, until retiring in 2000.

He received numerous awards including the 2002 Poets' Prize for Collected Poems: 1952-1999.

== Works ==
- "Fishing Around", The New Yorker, January 21, 2008
- The Lovemaker (1960), poems, received the Lamont Poetry Prize in 1961.
- White Blossoms (1965), poems
- A Book of Dying, poems
- The Mercy of Sorrow, poems
- Naked Poetry (1969), anthology, editor with Stephen Berg
- The Door Standing Open: Selected Poems (1970)
- Poems from the Hebrew (1973), translator
- Small Song (1979), poems
- Tungsteno, novel by Caesar Vallejo (1982), translator
- Evening Wind (1987), poems
- Couplets
- Selected Translations
- The Collected Poems of Henri Coulette (1990), editor with Donald Justice
- Natural Selection (1995), poems
- Thomas Hardy: Selected Poems (1998), editor
- The Poetry of E. A. Robinson (1999), editor
- Collected Poems 1952-1999 (2000)
- Poems of the American West (2002), editor
- Poems of Jorge Luis Borges, translator with Richard Barnes
