= Laura Jensen =

Laura Jensen may refer to:

- Laura Jensen (handballer) (born 1999), Danish handball player
- Laura Linnea Jensen (born 1948), American poet
