= Leonid Alaev =

Russian scientist (1932–2023)

- Born: Leonid Borisovich Alaev; 20 October 1932; Moscow, Russian SFSR, USSR
- Died: 31 July 2023 (aged 90); Moscow, Russia
- Education: MSU Faculty of History; Institute of Asian and African Countries
- Occupation: Historian
- Employer(s): Institute of Practical Oriental Studies; Institute of Asian and African Countries; Institute of Oriental Studies of the Russian Academy of Sciences; Moscow State Institute of International Relations; Pedagogical Institute of Irkutsk State University

Leonid Borisovich Alaev (Russian: Леонид Борисович Алаев; 20 October 1932 – 31 July 2023) was a Soviet and Russian historian and indologist, Doctor of Sciences in Historical Sciences, principal researcher at the Institute of Oriental Studies of the Russian Academy of Sciences, professor at the Moscow State Institute of International Relations, and honorary professor at the Pedagogical Institute of Irkutsk State University.

Alaev was the editor of Oriens (1988–1999).

== Life and career ==
Leonid Borisovich Alaev was born on 20 October 1932. He graduated from the Faculty of History at Lomonosov Moscow State University in 1954. Since 1956, he was working at the Institute of Oriental Studies of the Russian Academy of Sciences.

In 1960, he defended his candidate's dissertation. In 1982, he defended his doctoral dissertation. In 1986, he received the title of professor.

Alaev was the author of about 250 works. He published in the Great Russian Encyclopedia and the Cambridge Economic History of India.

His work has been reviewed by Alexander Gordon and Gennady Drach. He was a friend of Leonid Vasilyev.

Leonid Alaev died in Moscow on 31 July 2023, at the age of 90.
