= ACA Galleries =

Art Gallery in Chelsea NYC

- Established: 1932; 94 years ago
- Location: Chelsea, New York City
- Coordinates: 40°44′46″N 74°00′20″W
- Type: Art gallery
- Founders: Herman Baron, Stuart Davis, Yasuo Kuniyoshi, and Adolf Dehn
- Website: www.acagalleries.com

ACA Galleries is a New York City-based art gallery founded in 1932 by Herman Baron, Stuart Davis, Yasuo Kuniyoshi, and Adolf Dehn. ACA Galleries is recognized as a pioneer in exhibiting contemporary American art by African Americans, minorities, and women artists.

== History ==
=== 1930s ===
In 1932, Herman Baron opened the first iteration of A.C.A. Gallery at 1269 Madison Avenue. Originally named American Contemporary Art Galleries, ACA Galleries was founded during the Great Depression and focused on showing art from the Social Realism movement. Social Realist artists featured at ACA included Raphael and Moses Soyer, Adolf Dehn, Yasuo Kuniyoshi, and William Gropper. The gallery also showcased works by American Modernists, such as Stuart Davis, Rockwell Kent, Max Weber, and Otto Soglow.

In 1935, the ACA Galleries and Herman Baron hosted the first meeting of the American Artists' Congress. By 1938 the gallery had moved to 52 West Eighth Street.

=== 1940s ===
ACA's exhibitions during the 1940s, featured works by artists including Philip Evergood and Phillip Reisman. In 1942, the gallery presented Charles W. White's first solo exhibition. In the 1940s, ACA faced criticism from Michigan congressman George A. Dondero, who accused the gallery of promoting an un-American vision. ACA's Herman Baron countered Dondero's allegations in his essay "American Art Under Attack".

=== 1950s ===
ACA showcased Alice Neel's work from December 1950 to January 1951. In the late 1950s, Herman Baron's nephew, Sidney Bergen, joined the gallery.

=== 1960s ===
In 1960, ACA Galleries presented a four-person show of work by: Alice Neel, Jonah Kinigstein, Anthony Toney, Giacomo Porzano. Upon Herman Baron's death in 1961, Sidney Bergen assumed the Directorship of ACA.

=== 1970s ===
During the 1970s, ACA's exhibitions featured African American artists such as Barkley L. Hendricks and Benny Andrews. Additionally, the gallery showcased works of sculpture and assemblage, including pieces by John Kearney and Joseph Cornell.

=== 1990s ===
In the 1990s, ACA exhibited artists like African-American painter Richard Mayhew, who explored landscape themes through his Native American heritage, and painter/printmaker Wendy Mark, known for her abstract landscapes in monotype. The gallery also added Faith Ringgold to its program, showcasing her paintings, prints, books, tankas, and quilts that reference her activism and African-American heritage.

=== 2000s ===
In the 21st century, ACA Galleries moved to Chelsea, New York City and expanded its programs under the leadership of Jeffrey Bergen, who took charge in 2001 following Sidney Bergen's death. Exhibitions have featured Ilya Bolotowsky, Sidney Goodman, Irwin Kremen, and DeLoss McGraw.

=== 2010s ===
In 2018, the gallery presented a memorial show of Richard Hambleton. In 2018, the gallery presented a series of paintings by John Mellencamp. In June 2019, Faith Ringgold, in collaboration with ACA Galleries, had her first international solo exhibition at London's Serpentine Galleries. In 2019, the gallery presented a solo exhibition of Salvador Dalí, featuring etchings, tapestries and drawings from the Argillet Collection. In 2019, the gallery presented a show by Bruce High Quality Foundation.

=== 2020s ===
In 2022, ACA Galleries presented a solo show by photorealist painter John Baeder. In 2023, the gallery presented a show by graffiti artist Phase 2. In 2025, the gallery presented a show of Robert Graham Carter and Charles W. White. In 2025, the gallery presented a show by Doowon Lee of artworks inspired by Pakistan. In 2025, the gallery collaborated with The McEachern Art Center at Mercer University to present “Vaivén” featuring the work of artist Kandy Lopez.
