= Laura Linnea Jensen =

American poet (born 1948)

- Born: November 16, 1948 (age 77); Tacoma, Washington
- Education: University of Washington in Seattle; MFA from the Iowa Writers' Workshop in 1974
- Occupation: Poet
- Writing career
- Language: English
- Notable awards: 1989 Guggenheim Fellowship; NEA fellowship; Washington State Arts Commission grant

Laura Linnea Jensen (born November 16, 1948, in Tacoma, Washington) is an American poet.

She graduated from the University of Washington in Seattle, where she studied with David Wagoner, Mark Strand, and Galway Kinnell, and from the Iowa Writers' Workshop with an MFA in 1974, where she studied with Norman Dubie, Donald Justice, and Marvin Bell. She became friends with Tess Gallagher.

Her work appeared in Ploughshares. She read at Burning Word 2005. She lives near Wright Park, Tacoma, Washington.

== Awards ==
- 1989 Guggenheim Fellowship
- NEA fellowship
- Washington State Arts Commission grant

== Works ==
- "Sarge"; "Steve Allen", Salt River Review, Volume 6, Number 1, Winter, 2002–2003
- "The Red Dog", Nothing to Say and Saying It, September 6, 2006
- Shelter Dragon Gate, 1985 ISBN 978-0-937872-28-4
- Memory, Dragon Gate, 1982, ISBN 978-0-937872-02-4; Carnegie Mellon University Press, 2006, ISBN 978-0-88748-456-8
- Bad boats, Ecco Press, 1977; ECCO Press, 1984 ISBN 978-0-912946-39-9

=== Chapbooks ===
- Sky Empty of Orion, 1985
- The Story Makes Them Whole, Porch Publications, 1979
- Tapwater: poems, Graywolf Press, 1978
- Anxiety and ashes: poems, Penumbra Press, 1976
- After I Have Voted, Gemini 1972
