= Philip Booth (poet) =

American poet (1925–2007)

Philip Edmund Booth (October 8, 1925 – July 2, 2007) was an American poet and educator; he has been called "Maine's clearest poetic voice."

== Life ==
Booth was born in 1925 in Hanover, New Hampshire. Booth served in the United States Air Force in the Second World War. He then attended Dartmouth College, where he studied with Robert Frost; he received his B.A. in 1947. He subsequently received an M.A. from Columbia University. Booth married Margaret Tillman in 1946; they had three daughters. He spent much of his time living in Castine, Maine in a house that has been handed down through his family for five generations.

Booth was an instructor and professor of English and of creative writing at Dartmouth College, Bowdoin College, Wellesley College, and at Syracuse University. Booth was one of the founders of the Creative Writing program at Syracuse. One of his students, the poet Stephen Dunn, has written of his 1969-70 experience at Syracuse that, "We had come to study with Philip Booth, Donald Justice, W.D. Snodgrass, George P. Elliott, arguably the best group of writer-teachers that existed at the time."

== Poetry ==
Booth's poetry was published in many periodicals including The New Yorker, The Atlantic Monthly, The American Poetry Review, Poetry, and Denver Quarterly. He published 10 poetry collections and one book about writing poetry (see references below).

One of Booth's early poems, "Chart 1203," is indicative of the physical character of some of his poetry and also of his lifelong love of the sea and sailing:

Whoever works a storm to windward, sails
in rain, or navigates in island fog,
must reckon from the slow swung lead, from squalls

on cheek; must bear by compass, chart, and log.
...

...He weathers rainsquall,

linestorm, fear, who bears away from the sound
of sirens wooing him to the cape's safe lee.
He knows the ghostship bow, the sudden headland

immanent in fog; but where rocks wander, he
steers down the channel that his courage
dredges. He knows the chart is not the sea.

A much later poem, "Places without Names," has a more public concern:

...What gene demands old men command young men to die?
The young gone singing to Antietam, Aachen, Anzio.

To Bangalore, the Choisin Reservoir, Dien Bien Phu,
My Lai. Places in the heads of men who have no
mind left...

A major essay regarding Booth's poetry was published by Guy Rotella in 1983.

== Works incorporating Booth's poetry ==
An illustrated children's book built on Booth's poem "Crossing" from Letter from a Distant Land was published in 2001. This was the first book illustrated by Bagram Ibatoulline, who has since illustrated many books published for young readers. The book received a starred review from Kirkus Reviews, and was listed as one of the best children's books of 2001 by Publishers Weekly. Booth's poem has a rhythm but isn't a narrative; Ibatoulline's illustrations provide one.

Around 1996, Arnold Berleant created songs from Booth's poems "First Song", "Chances", and "The Dancer". A performance of Berleant's "Chances" by Nancy Ogle has been posted online.

== Awards ==
Bess Hokin Prize (1955). Lamont Poetry Prize for Letter from a Distant Land (1956). Saturday Review Poetry Award (1957). Emily Clark Balch Prize of the Virginia Quarterly Review (1964). Theodore Roethke Prize for a poem in Poetry Northwest (1970). Syracuse University Chancellor's Citation (1981). Fellowships from the Academy of American Poets (1983), the Guggenheim Foundation (1958, 1964), and the Rockefeller Foundation (1968). Maurice English Poetry Award for Relations (1987). Poem selected for The Best American Poetry 1999. Poets' Prize (2001) for Lifelines.

== Poetry collections ==
- Lifelines: Selected Poems, 1950-1999 (Viking Press, 1999). ISBN 0-670-88287-9
- Pairs (Viking Penguin, New York, 1994). ISBN 0-14-058724-1
- Selves (Viking Penguin, New York, 1990). ISBN 0-14-058646-6
- Relations (Viking Penguin, 1986). ISBN 0-14-058560-5
- Before Sleep (Viking Adult, 1980). ISBN 0-670-15529-2
- Available Light (Viking Adult, 1976). ISBN 0-670-14310-3
- Margins (Viking Adult, 1970). ISBN 0-670-45623-3
- Weathers and Edges (Viking Adult, 1966). ISBN 0-670-75509-5
- The Islanders (Viking Adult, 1961). ISBN 0-670-40221-4
- Letter from a Distant Land (Viking, 1957). ASIN B000BYR9AE

== Additional bibliography ==
- Booth, Philip (1996). Trying to Say It: Outlooks and Insights on How Poems Happen. Ann Arbor: University of Michigan Press. ISBN 0-472-06586-6.
