= Mario Trejo (writer) =

Argentine poet, playwright, screenwriter and journalist

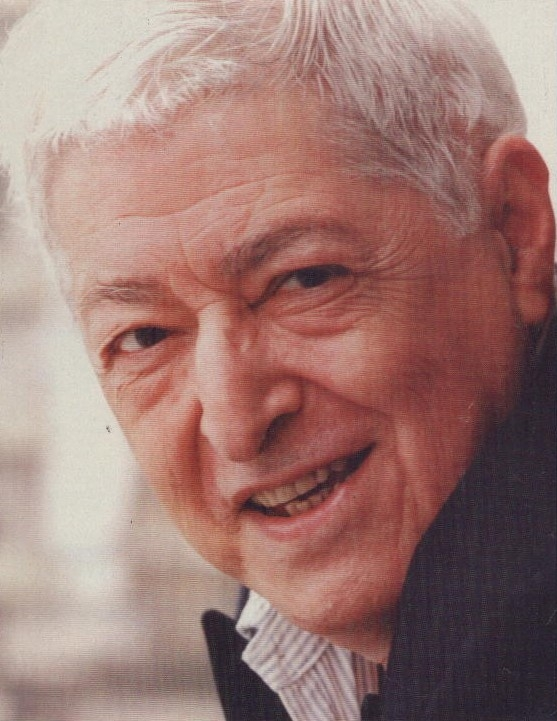
- Born: Mario César Trejo; 13 January 1926; Argentina
- Died: 14 May 2012 (aged 86)
- Occupations: Poet, playwright, and journalist

Mario Trejo (13 January 1926 – 14 May 2012) was an Argentine poet, playwright, screenwriter, and journalist.

== Biography ==
Mario César Trejo was born on January 13, 1926, though there is disagreement on his birth city; some sources indicate the city of Buenos Aires, while others La Plata; yet, Jorge Ariel Madrazo states in his prologue written for Trejo's poem entitled Orgasm (Orgasmo) that "Mario Trejo declares, otherwise, being born in Tierra del Fuego, in Comodoro Rivadavia, or in many other locations: everything indicates that this happened in the southern part of the country, but he does not specify in which year (Trejo agrees with Marcel Duchamp in that such precisions "only serve the fools and Spanish literature professors." He collaborated with several Argentine literary journals such as Contemporánea (1949), Luz y sombra (1948), Cinedrama, revista de cine y teatro contemporáneos (1953), Ciclo y Conjugación de Buenos Aires, as well as others European publications such as L'Expresso of Rome.

== Career ==
Trejo was part of the very important "Poetry Buenos Aires Movement", formed in the 50s around the "Poetry Buenos Aires" magazine directed by Raúl Gustavo Aguirre, of which 30 editions were published during a decade, starting on the spring of 1950. Other important poets of those years collaborated, like Alberto Vanasco, Edgar Bailey, Rodolfo Alonso, Ramiro de Casasbellas, Paco Urondo, Alejandra Pizarnik, Daniel Giribaldi, Miguel Brascó, Elizabeth Azcona Cronwell, Natalio Hocsman and Jorge Carrol.

He also worked in cinema and two films must be mentioned: in The Oil Route (Italy, 1966) Trejo interpreted himself, directed by Bernardo Bertolucci, whereas Desarraigo (Uprooted, Cuba 1965), directed by Fausto Canel, obtained an honorable mention at the 1966 San Sebastián International Film Festival.

His relationship with music and friendships with musicians resulted in collaborations, including the songs The Lost Birds and Private Scandals with Ástor Piazzolla, and Enrico Rava's album Quotation Marks (Japo Records, 1976), which featured John Abercrombie, Jack DeJohnette, Néstor Astarita, Ricardo Lew, and singer Jeanne Lee performing Trejo's poems written in English.

=== Award ===
In 1964, Trejo unanimously won the Casa de las Américas literary award for his book The use of the word.

== Death ==
He died on 14 May 2012 at the age of 86 years.

== Works ==
- Poetry
  - Celdas de la sangre (1946)
  - El uso de la palabra (1964)
  - La pena capital (1980)
  - Orgasmo y otros poemas (1989)
- Playwright
  - No hay piedad para Hamlet (No Mercy for Hamlet, 1954), in collaboration with Alberto Vanasco, Buenos Aires Municipal Award, 1957, and Florencio Sánchez National Award, 1960.
  - Libertad y otras intoxicaciones (1968)
  - Libertad, Libertad, Libertad (1968)
  - La reconstrucción de la Ópera de Viena (1968)
  - La guerra civil (1973)
- Screenplays
  - El final (1964)
  - Desarraigo (1965)
  - Infinito futuro/Kill me future (1965), in collaboration with Bernardo Bertolucci; however, the screenplay that was never shot.
- Song lyrics
  - Los pájaros perdidos (1973), music by Ástor Piazzolla.
  - La tristeza y el mar, music by Waldo de los Ríos.
