= Henri Coulette =

American poet

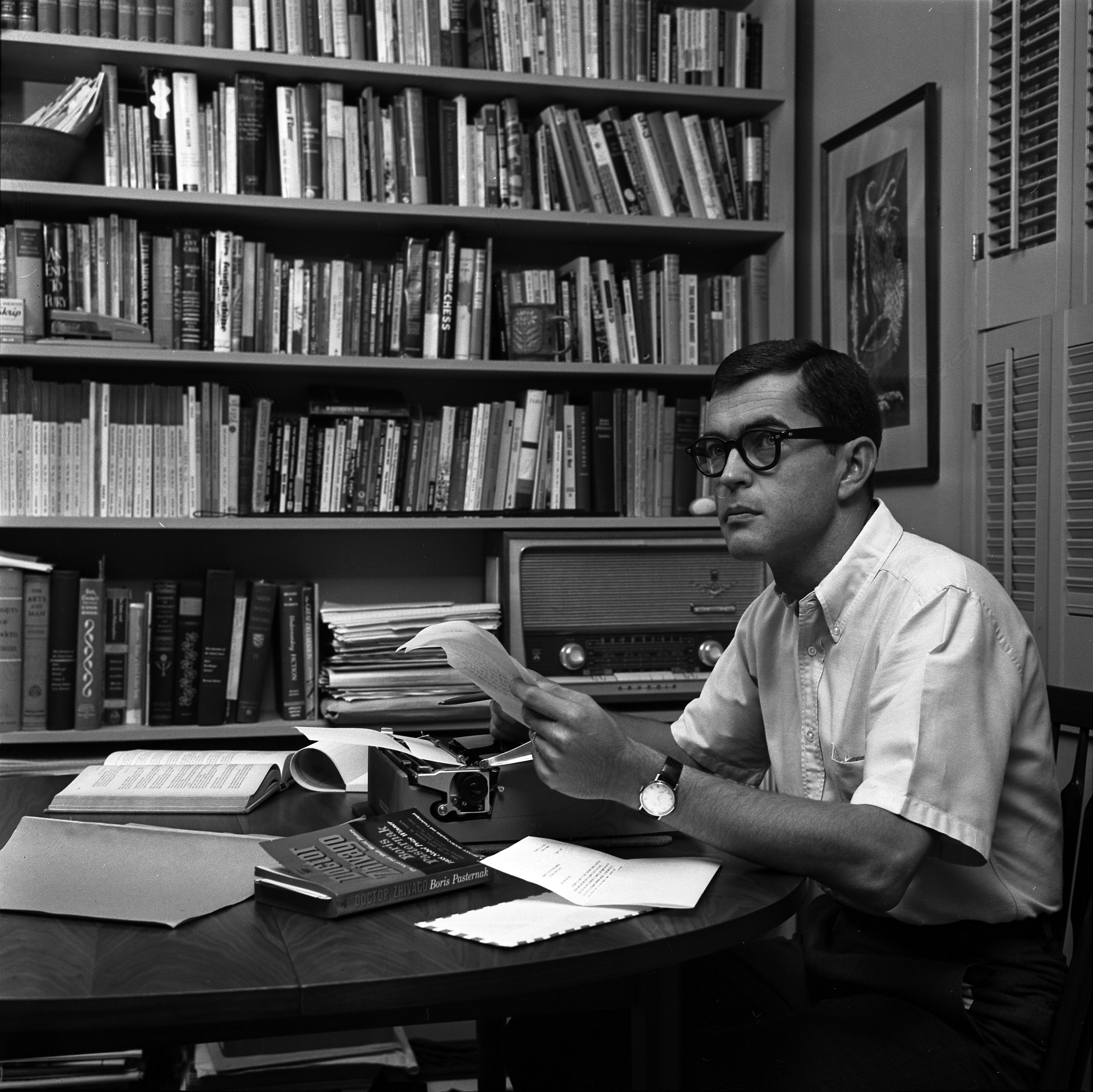
Coulette in 1965

Henri Coulette (November 17, 1927 – March 26, 1988) was an American poet and educator. His first book, The War of the Secret Agents and Other Poems (Scribner, 1965), was greeted with acclaim and won the Lamont Poetry Prize. His second collection, The Family Goldschmitt (Scribner, 1971), seems to have received little attention, and it has been reported that much of the print run was accidentally pulped. He did not publish another book during his life, but had been organizing a volume when he died. Of these later poems, Tad Richards has written, "Though only in his fifties, he surveys the territory of death, particularly in the near-perfect 'Petition,' an elegy for his cat, with a concreteness he did not often find in life." Two of Coulette's poems, "Night Thoughts" and "Postscript", were included in the 2003 anthology, California Poetry: From the Gold Rush to the Present; the editors write that "Coulette melded seamless metrics with a lifelong devotion to California icons like the LBG-30 (a Glendale computer), the noir Los Angeles memorialized by Raymond Chandler, and the gravesites of Hollywood movie stars."

Coulette was born in Los Angeles, California, and earned a bachelor's degree in 1952 from Los Angeles State College, now known as California State University, Los Angeles. He studied at the University of Iowa Writers' Workshop, after which he returned to California. He spent nearly his entire career as a faculty member at California State University, Los Angeles. After Coulette's death (in South Pasadena, California, at 60), the poets Donald Justice and Robert Mezey edited and published Coulette's collected poetry. The collection included a wealth of unpublished poems, and was published in 1990 by the University of Arkansas Press. In 2026, Michael Caines and Boris Dralyuk edited and introduced a New and Selected Poems (Carcanet), which includes much of the work in the 1990 volume and a few more previously unpublished poems.

Lord of the Tenth Life,
Welcome my Jerome,
A fierce, gold tabby.
Make him feel at home.

He loves bird and mouse,
He loves a man's lap,
And in winter light,
Paws tucked in, a nap.

— Petition

== Poetry collections ==
- The War of the Secret Agents and Other Poems. Scribner. 1966. OCLC 291698.
- The Family Goldschmitt. Scribner. 1971. ISBN 9780684124827. OCLC 161749.
- Justice, Donald; Mezey, Robert, eds. (1990). The Collected Poems of Henri Coulette. University of Arkansas Press. ISBN 9781557281449. OCLC 21448000.
- Caines, Michael; Dralyuk, Boris, eds. (2026). New and Selected Poems. Carcanet. ISBN 9781800175525.
