= Rolling Stock (newspaper) =

Rolling Stock was a newspaper of ideas and a chronicler of the 1980s published in Boulder, Colorado by Ed Dorn and Jennifer Dunbar Dorn.

== History ==
In 1977, Edward and Jennifer Dunbar Dorn moved from San Francisco to Boulder, Colorado, where Edward had a contract as visiting poet at the University of Colorado. The couple initially considered it temporary, but Edward was asked to stay on to teach, and later offered a tenure track position. Jennifer began teaching Film Studies, and Boulder became the couple's permanent home for the 1980s.

For most of his life Edward had nurtured an interest in printing, and in 1972 had published an experimental single-issue tabloid titled Bean News. In Boulder, the university's creative writing program had become a hub of the regional avant-garde literary scene, and the Dorns had talked with friends from the program about creating a journal to give voice to this community. They envisioned a "real" newspaper, "a modern day version of the Eighteenth Century's Rambler, Spectator, Tatler, and Idler". The first issue was published in June 1981. In total, Rolling Stock ran for seventeen issues, with two being double issues. Publication ceased in 1991.

== Contents and contributors ==
The contents of Rolling Stock were eclectic and freewheeling, covering topics both literary and political, reflective of the Edward and Jennifer's varying interests. Under the motto "If it moves, print it!", it published columns on law, medicine, cinema, books, and sport—notably golf, which Dorn himself played seriously at the time. Social commentary, satire, and letters mixed with poetry and editorials from Edward. Writing in 1993, Dorn called it "the literary gazette which spanned the Eighties like a rope suspension bridge spans a bottomless defile in the jungles of Borneo".

Jennifer Dunbar Dorn's contributions as coeditor and producer were substantial; Edward Dorn said that Rolling Stock was "Jenny's effort". The newspaper was conventionally designed, with Jennifer performing layout via paste up on a light table, and printed via offset lithography in tabloid format. The title was suggested by Sidney Goldfarb and played on associations with the iconography of the American West, the Rolling Stones, and the rolling of newsprint through a press. Jim Howard provided the cover logo, an image of an oncoming steam locomotive. Graphics were regularly supplied by Tom Clark, John Dunbar and Ann Mikolowski among others.

The paper had a regional motif but international aspirations, and it published dispatches from around the world. Correspondents in the first issue reported from Mexico, England, and Chicago; the Mideast, Latin America, and the Soviet Union were locations of ongoing interest. According to Edward, for several months in 1983 and 1984 it was the sole U.S. publication to feature a stringer reporting from Damascus, which he regarded as the "apex" of its ambitions.

Contributors included Woody Haut on Labor, John Daley on Law, Roger Echo-Hawk on Native American Affairs, Nick Sedgwick on Golf, Stan Brakhage on Film, Jane Brakhage on Lump Gulch, Dick Dillof the "hobo swing musician and Montana rambler", Lucía Berlin in California, Tom Raworth, London and Cambridge, Fielding Dawson, New York City; Jeremy Prynne, English Letters, Marilyn Krysl in China, James Inskeep, Southern Colorado, Tom Clark, Southern California, and Bob Lewis, Akron, Ohio and Abroad.

Rolling Stock and Edward Dorn drew criticism for commentary on the AIDS crisis. Issue #5 contained a page dedicated to "the 1983 Lemon/AIDS awards for Poetry in recognition of the current Epidemic of Idiocy on the poetry scene." Written in collaboration with Clark, the satirical awards were "a kind of over-the-top thumbs-down sign handed out for behavior Dorn and his cronies in the poetry business didn't want to tolerate". Keith Tuma wrote that they were "sophomoric, stupid, and cruel". They drew even sharper criticism from Eliot Weinberger and Kevin Killian, triggered debate in the literary community, and damaged Dorn's reputation with some readers.
