= Mark Strand =

Canadian-American poet, essayist, translator

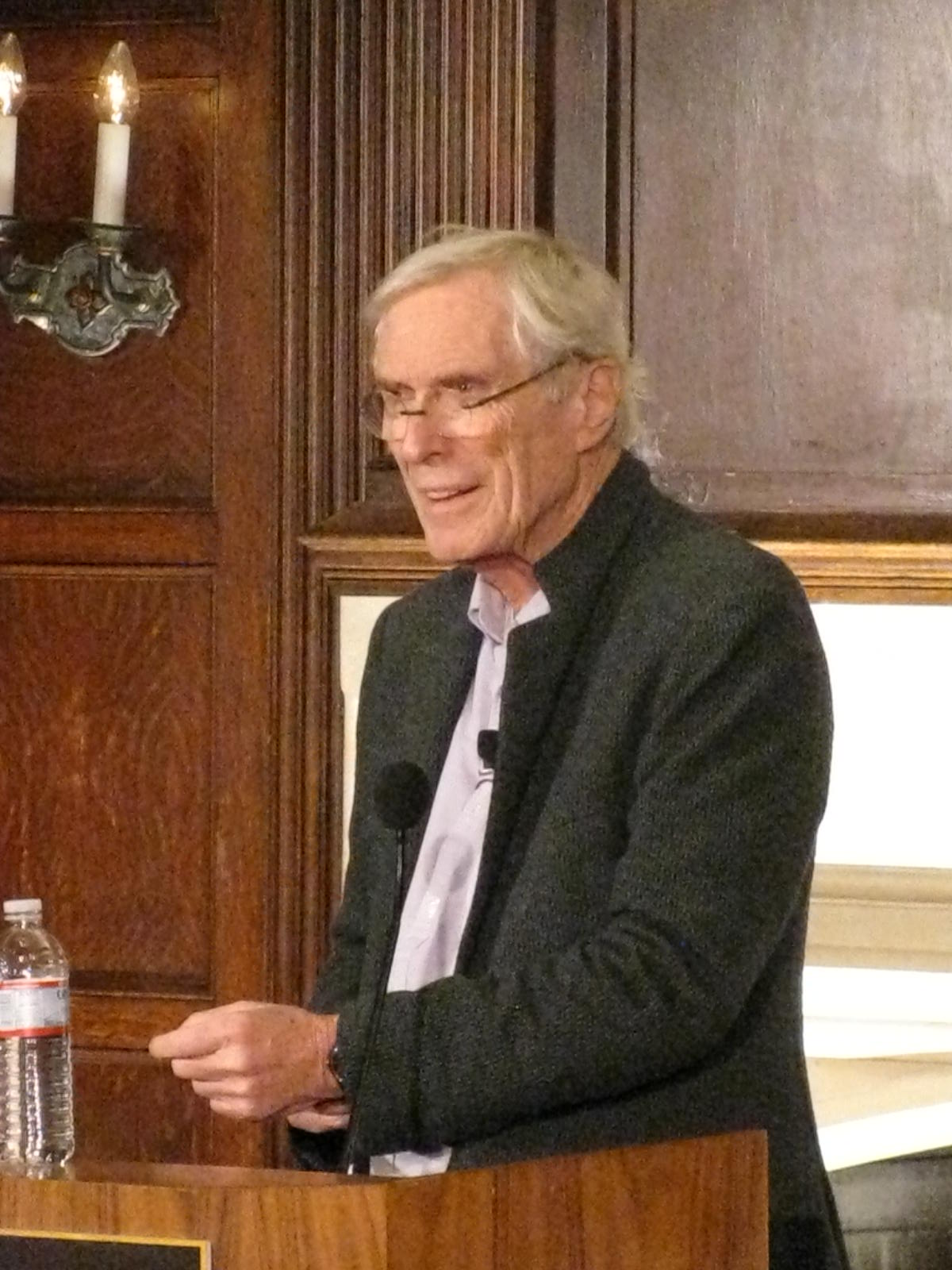
- Strand at Georgetown University, 2012
- Born: April 11, 1934; Summerside, Prince Edward Island, Canada
- Died: November 29, 2014 (aged 80); Brooklyn, New York, U.S.
- Education: Antioch College (BA); Yale University (BFA); University of Iowa (MFA)
- Occupations: Poet; translator; novelist; essayist

Mark Strand (April 11, 1934 – November 29, 2014) was a Canadian-born American poet, essayist and translator. He was appointed Poet Laureate Consultant in Poetry to the Library of Congress in 1990 and received the Wallace Stevens Award in 2004. Strand was a professor of English and Comparative Literature at Columbia University from 2005 until his death in 2014.

== Biography ==
Strand was born in 1934 at Summerside, Prince Edward Island, Canada, to Robert Joseph Strand and Sonia Apter. Raised in a secular Jewish family, he spent his early years in North America and much of his adolescence in South and Central America. Strand graduated from Oakwood Friends School in 1951 and in 1957 earned his B.A. from Antioch College in Ohio. He then studied painting under Josef Albers at Yale University, where he earned a B.F.A in 1959. On a U.S.-Italy Fulbright Commission scholarship, Strand studied 19th-century Italian poetry in Florence in 1960–1961. He attended the Iowa Writers' Workshop at the University of Iowa the following year and earned a Master of Fine Arts in 1962. In 1965, he spent a year in Brazil as a Fulbright Lecturer.

In 1981, Strand was elected a member of The American Academy of Arts and Letters. He served as Poet Laureate Consultant in Poetry to the Library of Congress during the 1990–1991 term. In 1998, he left Johns Hopkins University to accept the Andrew MacLeish Distinguished Service Professorship of Social Thought at the Committee on Social Thought at the University of Chicago. From 2005 to his death, Strand taught literature and creative writing at Columbia University, in New York City.

Strand received numerous awards, including a MacArthur Fellowship in 1987 and the 1999 Pulitzer Prize for Poetry, for Blizzard of One. Harold Bloom included three volumes of Strand's poetry in his list of works defining the Western Canon.

Strand died of liposarcoma on November 29, 2014, in Brooklyn, New York.

== Poetry ==
Many of Strand's poems are nostalgic in tone, evoking the bays, fields, boats, and pines of his Prince Edward Island childhood. He has been compared to Robert Bly in his use of surrealism, though he attributes his poems' surreal elements to an admiration of the works of Max Ernst, Giorgio de Chirico, and René Magritte. Strand's poems use plain and concrete language, usually without rhyme or meter. In a 1971 interview, he said, "I feel very much a part of a new international style that has a lot to do with plainness of diction, a certain reliance on surrealist techniques, and a strong narrative element."

== Academic career ==
Strand's academic career took him to various colleges and universities, including:

=== Teaching positions ===
- University of Iowa, Iowa City, instructor in English, 1962–1965
- University of Brazil, Rio de Janeiro, Fulbright lecturer, 1965–1966
- Mount Holyoke College, South Hadley, MA, assistant professor, 1967
- Columbia University, New York City, adjunct associate professor, 1969–1972
- Brooklyn College, New York City, associate professor, 1970–1972
- Princeton University, Princeton, NJ, Bain-Swiggett Lecturer, 1973
- Brandeis University, Hurst professor of poetry, 1974–1975
- University of Utah, Salt Lake City, professor of English, 1981–1993
- Johns Hopkins University, Elliot Coleman Professor of Poetry, 1994–c. 1998
- University of Chicago, Committee on Social Thought, 1998 – ca. 2005
- Columbia University, New York City, professor of English and Comparative Literature, ca. 2005–2014

=== Visiting professor ===
- University of Washington, 1968, 1970
- Columbia University, 1980
- Yale University, 1969–1970
- University of Virginia, 1976, 1978
- California State University, Fresno, 1977
- University of California, Irvine, 1979
- Wesleyan University, 1979
- Harvard University, 1980

== Awards ==
Strand was awarded the following:

- 1960–1961: Fulbright Fellowship
- 1979: Fellowship of the Academy of American Poets
- 1987: MacArthur Fellowship
- 1990–1991: Poet Laureate Consultant in Poetry to the Library of Congress
- 1992: Bobbitt National Prize for Poetry
- 1993: Bollingen Prize
- 1999: Pulitzer Prize, for Blizzard of One
- 2004: Wallace Stevens Award
- 2009: Gold Medal in Poetry, from the American Academy of Arts and Letters

== Bibliography ==
=== Poetry ===
- 1964: Sleeping with One Eye Open, Stone Wall Press
- 1968: Reasons for Moving: Poems, Atheneum
- 1970: Darker: Poems, including "The New Poetry Handbook", Atheneum
- 1973: The Story of Our Lives, Atheneum ISBN 9780689105760
- 1973: The Sargentville Notebook, Burning Deck
- 1975: From Two Notebooks, No Mountains Poetry Project
- 1976: My Son, No Mountains Poetry Project
- 1978: Elegy for My Father, Windhover
- 1978: The Late Hour, Atheneum
- 1980: Selected Poems, including "Keeping Things Whole", Atheneum
- 1990: The Continuous Life, Knopf ISBN 9780679738442
- 1990: New Poems
- 1991: The Monument, Ecco Press (see also The Monument, 1978, prose)
- 1993: Dark Harbor: A Poem, long poem divided into 55 sections, Knopf
- 1998: Blizzard of One: Poems, Knopf winner of the 1999 Pulitzer Prize for poetry
- 1999: Chicken, Shadow, Moon & More, with illustrations by the author, Turtle Point Press
- 1999: "89 Clouds" a single poem, monotypes by Wendy Mark and introduction by Thomas Hoving, ACA Galleries (New York)
- 2006: Man and Camel, Knopf ISBN 9780375711268
- 2007: New Selected Poems
- 2012: Almost Invisible, Random House, ISBN 9780307957313
- 2014: Collected Poems, Knopf ISBN 9780385352512

=== Prose ===
- 1978: The Monument, Ecco (see also The Monument, 1991, poetry) ISBN 9780880012744
- 1982: Contributor: Claims for Poetry, edited by Donald Hall, University of Michigan Press
- 1982: The Planet of Lost Things, for children
- 1983: The Art of the Real, art criticism, C. N. Potter
- 1985: The Night Book, for children
- 1985: Mr. and Mrs. Baby and Other Stories, short stories, Knopf ISBN 9780880013864
- 1986: Rembrandt Takes a Walk, for children
- 1987: William Bailey, art criticism, Abrams
- 1993: Contributor: Within This Garden: Photographs by Ruth Thorne-Thomsen, Columbia College Chicago/Aperture Foundation
- 1994: Hopper, art criticism, Ecco Press ISBN 9780307957108
- 2000: The Weather of Words: Poetic Invention, Knopf
- 2000: With Eavan Boland, The Making of a Poem: A Norton Anthology of Poetic Forms, Norton (New York)

=== Poetry translations ===
- 1971: 18 Poems from the Quechua, Halty Ferguson
- 1973: The Owl's Insomnia, poems by Rafael Alberti, Atheneum
- 1976: Souvenir of the Ancient World, poems by Carlos Drummond de Andrade, Antaeus Editions
- 2002: Looking for Poetry: Poems by Carlos Drummond de Andrade and Rafael Alberti, with Songs from the Quechua
- 1993: Contributor: "Canto IV", Dante's Inferno: Translations by Twenty Contemporary Poets edited by Daniel Halpern, Harper Perennial
- 1986, according to one source, or 1987, according to another source: Traveling in the Family, poems by Carlos Drummond de Andrade, with Thomas Colchie; translator with Elizabeth Bishop, Colchie, and Gregory Rabassa) Random House

=== Editor ===
- 1968: The Contemporary American Poets, New American Library
- 1970: New Poetry of Mexico, Dutton
- 1976: Another Republic: Seventeen European and South American Writers, with Charles Simic, Ecco
- 1991: The Best American Poetry 1991, Macmillan
- 1994: Golden Ecco Anthology, Ecco Press
- 1994: The Golden Ecco Anthology
- 2005: 100 Great Poems of the Twentieth Century, W. W. Norton
