= Donald Justice =

American poet

- Born: August 12, 1925; Miami, Florida, U.S.
- Died: August 6, 2004 (aged 78); Iowa City, Iowa, U.S.
- Education: University of Miami (BA); University of North Carolina, Chapel Hill (MA); Stanford University; University of Iowa (PhD)
- Awards: Guggenheim Fellowship; Pulitzer Prize
- Scientific career
- Fields: Poetry
- Workplaces: University of Florida; Syracuse University

Donald Rodney Justice (August 12, 1925 – August 6, 2004) was an American poet and teacher of creative writing who won the Pulitzer Prize for Poetry in 1980.

== Early life and education ==
Justice was born on August 12, 1925, in Miami. He attended the University of Miami, where he obtained his bachelor's degree in 1945. He received an MA from the University of North Carolina in 1947, studied for a time at Stanford University, and earned a doctorate from the University of Iowa in 1954.

== Career ==
After obtaining his doctorate, Justice went on to teach for many years at the Iowa Writers' Workshop, the nation's first graduate program in creative writing. He also taught at Syracuse University, the University of California, Irvine, Princeton University, the University of Virginia, and the University of Florida.

Justice published thirteen collections of his poetry. The first collection, The Summer Anniversaries, was the winner of the Lamont Poetry Prize given by the Academy of American Poets in 1961; Selected Poems won the Pulitzer Prize for Poetry in 1980. He was awarded the Bollingen Prize in Poetry in 1991, and the Lannan Literary Award for Poetry in 1996.

His honors also included grants from the Guggenheim Foundation, the Rockefeller Foundation, and the National Endowment for the Arts. He was a member of the American Academy of Arts and Letters, and a Chancellor of the Academy of American Poets from 1997 to 2003. His Collected Poems was nominated for the National Book Award in 2004. Justice was a National Book Award Finalist three times, in 1961, 1974, and 1995.

== Death ==
Justice died August 6, 2004, at an Iowa City, Iowa nursing home. He had been in a nursing home after suffering a stroke several weeks before his death. He was 78 years old. His family said the immediate cause of death was pneumonia, but that he also had Parkinson's disease.

== Legacy ==
"In most ways, Justice was no different from any number of solid, quiet older writers devoted to traditional short poems. But he was different in one important sense: sometimes his poems weren't just good; they were great. They were great in the way that Elizabeth Bishop's poems were great, or Thom Gunn's or Philip Larkin's. They were great in the way that tells us what poetry used to be, and is, and will be."

David Orr

In his obituary for The Independent, Andrew Rosenheim wrote that Justice "was a legendary teacher, and despite his own Formalist reputation influenced a wide range of younger writers — his students included Mark Jarman, Rita Dove, James Tate, C. Dale Young, Ellen Bryant Voigt, Will Schmitz, Mark Strand, William Stafford, Larry Levis, and the novelist John Irving." Justice was one of the founders of the Creative Writing program at Syracuse. One of his students, the poet Stephen Dunn, has written of his 1969-70 experience at Syracuse that, "We had come to study with Philip Booth, Donald Justice, W.D. Snodgrass, George P. Elliott, arguably the best group of writer-teachers that existed at the time." His student and later colleague Marvin Bell said, "As a teacher, Don chose always to be on the side of the poem, defending it from half-baked attacks by students anxious to defend their own turf. While he had firm preferences in private, as a teacher Don defended all turfs. He had little use for poetic theory..."

Justice's former student, the poet and critic Tad Richards, noted that, "Donald Justice is likely to be remembered as a poet who gave his age a quiet but compelling insight into loss and distance, and who set a standard for craftsmanship, attention to detail, and subtleties of rhythm."

Critic Harold Bloom included Justice's Selected Poems (1979) in his list of works constituting the Western Canon.

Justice's work was the subject of the 1998 volume Certain Solitudes: On The Poetry of Donald Justice, a collection of essays edited by Dana Gioia and William Logan.

== Published work ==
=== Poetry collections ===
- The Old Bachelor and Other Poems (Pandanus Press, Miami, FL), 1951.
- The Summer Anniversaries (Wesleyan University Press, Middletown, CT), 1960; revised edition (University Press of New England, Hanover, NH), 1981.
- A Local Storm (Stone Wall Press, Iowa City, IA, 1963).
- Night Light (Wesleyan University Press, Middletown, CT, 1967); revised edition (University Press of New England, Hanover, NH, 1981).
- Sixteen Poems (Stone Wall Press, Iowa City, IA, 1970).
- From a Notebook (Seamark Press, Iowa City, IA, 1971).
- Departures (Atheneum, New York City, 1973).
- Selected Poems (Atheneum, New York City, 1979). Included in Harold Bloom's The Western Canon.
- Tremayne (Windhover Press, Iowa City, IA, 1984).
- The Sunset Maker (Anvil Press Poetry, 1987). ISBN 978-0-85646-195-8.
- A Donald Justice Reader (Middlebury, 1991). ISBN 978-0-87451-626-5.
- New and Selected Poems (Knopf, 1995). ISBN 978-0-679-44173-1.
- Orpheus Hesitated beside the Black River: Poems, 1952-1997 (Anvil Press Poetry, London, England), 1998.
- Collected Poems (Knopf, 2004). ISBN 978-1-4000-4239-5 .

=== Essay and interview collections ===
- Platonic Scripts, 1984
- Oblivion: On Writers and Writing, 1998
- Compendium: A Collection of Thoughts on Prosody. ed. David Koehn & Alan Soldofsky (Omnidawn, 2017). ISBN 978-1-63243-032-8

=== Edited volumes ===
Justice edited posthumous selections of unpublished poetry for four poets: Weldon Kees, Henri Coulette, Raeburn Miller, and Joe Bolton.

- Aspel, Alexander (1965). Aspel, Alexander; Justice, Donald (eds.). Contemporary French Poetry: Fourteen Witnesses after Man's Fate. University of Michigan Press.
- Kees, Weldon; Wojahn, David (2003). Justice, Donald (ed.). The Collected Poems of Weldon Kees (Third ed.). Bison Books. ISBN 978-0-8032-7809-7. The first edition of this collection was published in 1960.
- Coulette, Henri (1990). Justice, Donald; Mezey, Robert (eds.). Collected Poems of Henri Coulette. University of Arkansas Press. ISBN 978-1-55728-145-6.
- Miller, Raeburn; Justice, Donald (1994). Justice, Donald; Mackin, Cooper R.; Olson, Richard D. (eds.). The Comma after Love: Selected Poems of Raeburn Miller. University of Akron Press. ISBN 978-1-884836-03-9.
- Bolton, Joe (1999). Justice, Donald (ed.). Last Nostalgia: Poems 1982-1990. University of Arkansas Press. ISBN 978-1-55728-558-4.

=== Libretti ===
- The Young God - A Vaudeville (opera by Edward Miller), 1969
- The Death of Lincoln: an opera by Edwin London on an original libretto by Donald Justice, 1988

== See also ==
- Donald Justice Poetry Prize
