= Alberto Girri =

Argentine poet and writer

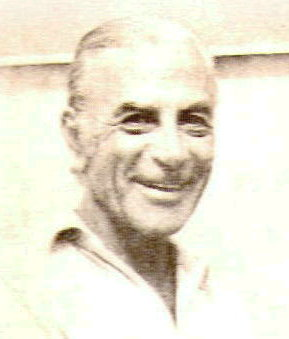
Alberto Girri

Alberto Girri (27 November 1919 – 16 November 1991) was an Argentine poet and writer born in Buenos Aires.

== Principal works ==
- Beatrix Cenci. Ópera.
- Juegos alegóricos. 1993.
- Trama de conflictos. 1988.
- Páginas de Alberto Girri. 1983.
- Lírica de percepciones. 1983.
- Lo propio lo de todos. 1980.
- Recluso platónico. 1978
- El motivo es el poema. 1976.
- Quien habla no esta muerto. 1975.
- Penitencia y el mérito. 1957.
- El tiempo que destruye. 1950.
- Trece poemas. 1949.
- Coronación de la espera. 1947.
- Playa sola. 1946.
- Poesía de observación.
