= Washington Delgado =

Peruvian poet

- Born: October 26, 1927; Cusco, Peru
- Died: September 7, 2003 (aged 75); Lima, Peru
- Occupations: Writer, poet, essayist, professor

José Washington Delgado Tresierra (October 26, 1927 in Cusco – September 7, 2003 in Lima) was a Peruvian poet.

He studied at the Pontificia Universidad Católica del Perú in Lima, later pursuing his studies in literature in Madrid between 1955 and 1958.

== Works ==
- Formas de la ausencia (1955)
- Días del corazón (1957)
- Para vivir mañana (1959)
- Un mundo dividido (1970)
- Destierro por vida (1970)
- Reunión elegida (1988)
- Historia de Artidoro (1994)
- La muerte del doctor Octavio Aguilar
- Historia de la literatura del Perú Republicano
