= Kandy G. Lopez =

American Artist (born 1987)

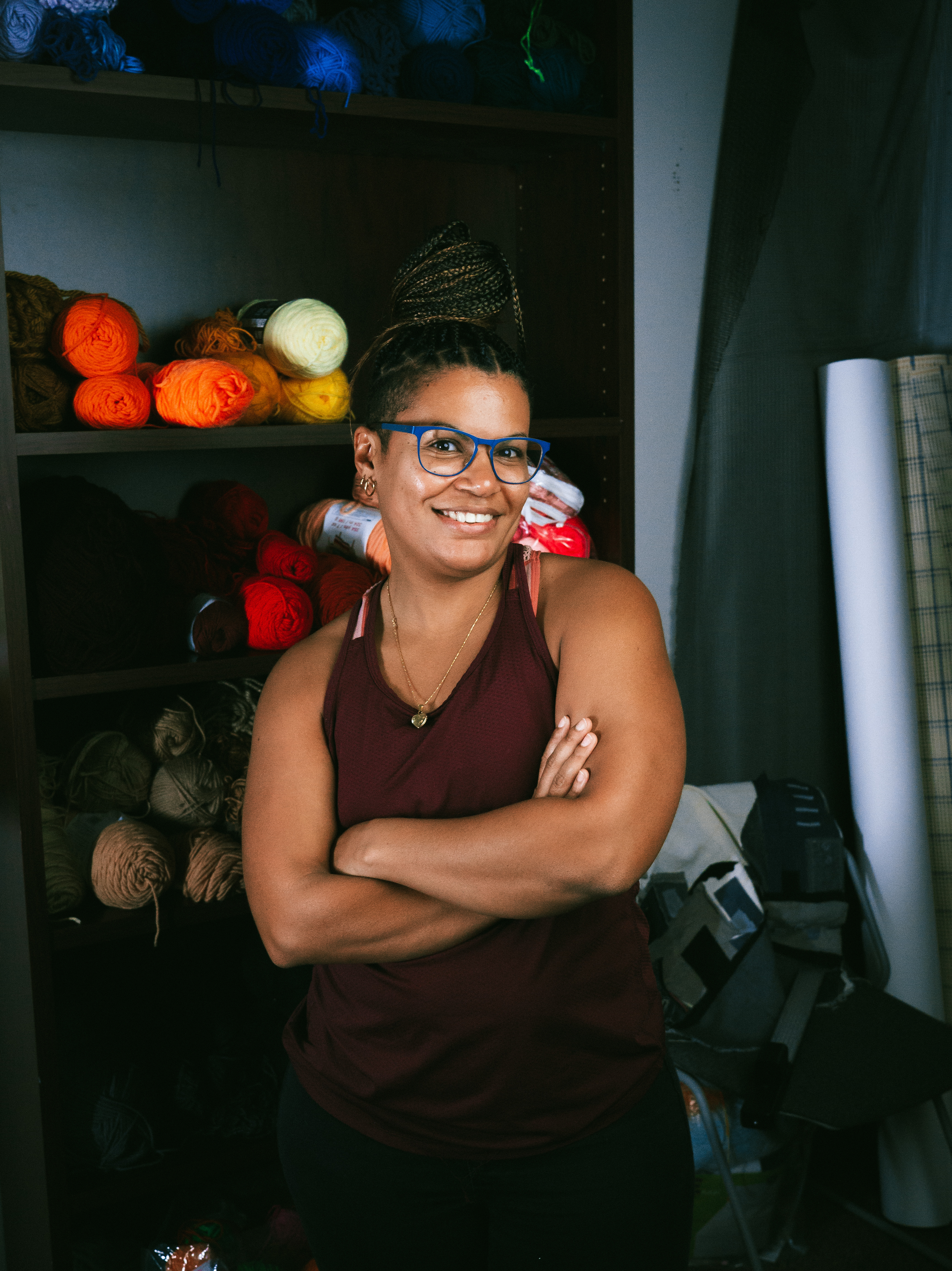
- Born: July 10, 1987 (age 39); Bayonne, New Jersey, U.S.
- Other name: Kandy G. Lopez–Moreno
- Education: Maryland Institute College of Art; University of South Florida (B.S., B.F.A.); Florida Atlantic University (M.F.A.)
- Occupations: Visual artist, professor
- Known for: Fiber art and portrait paintings
- Website: kandyglopez.com

Kandy G. Lopez , also known as Kandy G. Lopez–Moreno (born July 10, 1987) is an American multidisciplinary and mixed media artist, and educator. She is known for her fiber art works, which focus on the representation of marginalized individuals to explore race, gender, and class. Lopez is an associate professor at Nova Southeastern University in Fort Lauderdale, Florida.

== Early life and education ==
Kandy G. Lopez was born on July 10, 1987, to Dominican parents in Bayonne, New Jersey. After her parents divorced, she moved to Hialeah, Florida with her mother and brother. It wasn't until she attended Rainbow Park Elementary in Opa-locka, Florida that she found a sense of cultural identity and belonging in the area's predominantly African-American population. Her art education began at Norland Middle School of the Arts in Opa-locka, and continued at the New World School of the Arts in Miami, Florida.

She attended Maryland Institute College of Art in Baltimore for a year before she relocated to Tampa, Florida where she received her B.S. degree in business with a concentration in marketing and management, and B.F.A. degree with a concentration in painting from the University of South Florida. She went on to receive her M.F.A. degree with a concentration in painting from Florida Atlantic University.

== Work ==
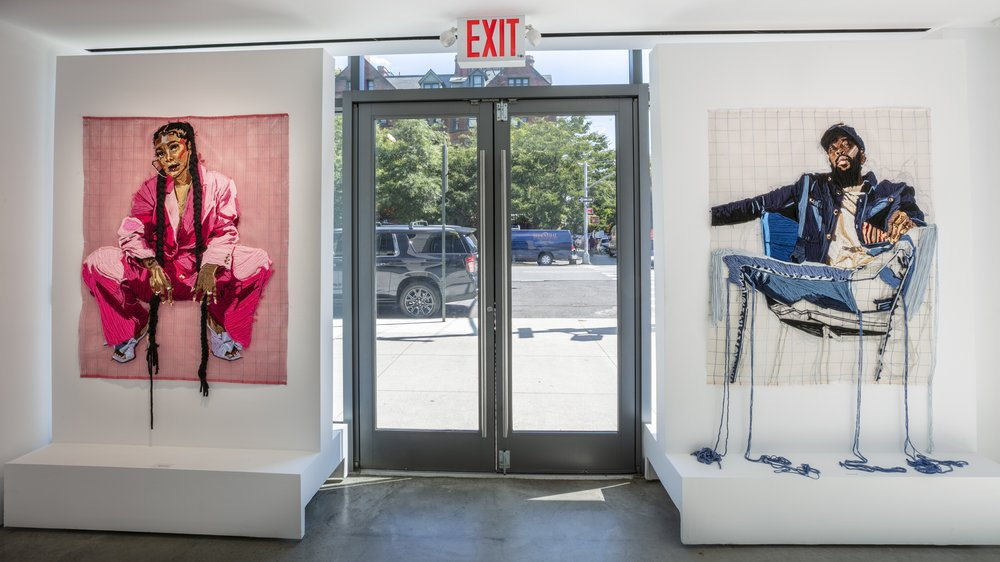

Lopez' artwork explores the complexities of the Afro-Caribbean American experience. She credits a piece of thread falling on a piece of her artwork back in 2015 for her incorporation of fiber into her artwork.

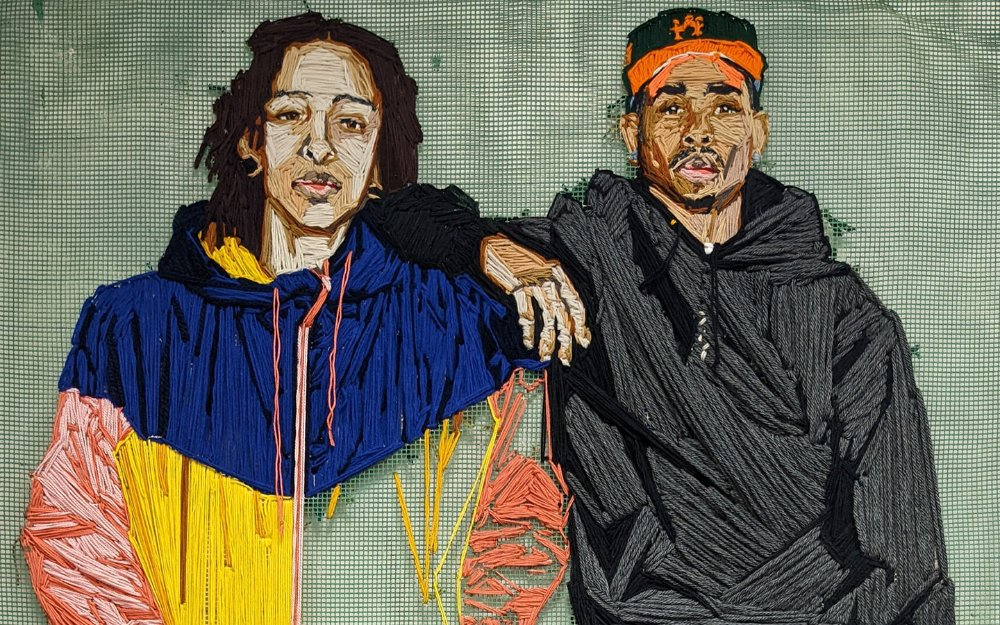
Marly & Luis (green), 2022

Marly and Luis is a (96 x 60 inch) yarn and acrylic on mesh canvas depicting two siblings of Dominican decent in front of a green background. In the image, Luis is leaning his arm on Marly's shoulder while they both look straight. Created in 2022, it's featured in Lopez' solo exhibition, (In)Visible Threads Exhibition (2024–2025), at the Riverside Art Museum, California.

Lopez works as an associate professor at Nova Southeastern University in Fort Lauderdale, Florida.
