= Ed Dorn =

American poet (1929–1999)

- Born: Edward Merton Dorn; April 2, 1929; Villa Grove, Illinois, U.S.
- Died: December 10, 1999 (aged 70); Denver, Colorado, U.S.
- Education: University of Illinois Urbana-Champaign
- Occupations: Poet; educator
- Spouse(s): Helene; Jennifer Dunbar
- Writing career
- Notable work: Gunslinger (1968)

Edward Merton Dorn (April 2, 1929 – December 10, 1999) was an American poet and teacher often associated with the Black Mountain poets. His most famous work is Gunslinger (1968).

== Overview ==
Dorn was born on April 2, 1929, in Villa Grove, Illinois, United States. He grew up in rural poverty during the Great Depression. He attended a one-room schoolhouse for his first eight grades. He later studied at the University of Illinois and at Black Mountain College (1950–55). At Black Mountain he came into contact with Charles Olson, who greatly influenced his literary worldview and his sense of himself as poet.

Dorn's final examiner at Black Mountain was Robert Creeley, with whom, along with the poet Robert Duncan, Dorn became included as one of a trio of younger poets later associated with Black Mountain and with Charles Olson.

In 1951, Dorn left Black Mountain and traveled to the Pacific Northwest, where he did manual labor and met his first wife, Helene; they returned to the school in late 1954. After graduation and two years of travel, Dorn's family settled in Washington state, the setting for his autobiographical novel By the Sound (originally published as Rites of Passage), which describes the grinding poverty of life in "the basement stratum of society". In 1961, he accepted his first teaching job at Idaho State University, where he published the magazine Wild Dog. His first book of poetry, The Newly Fallen, was published by LeRoi Jones's Totem Press in 1961.

In 1965, with the photographer Leroy Lucas, Dorn spent the summer visiting Indian reservations for a book commissioned by William Morrow & Co. Press, The Shoshoneans. That fall, British poet and scholar Donald Davie invited him to join the faculty at the Literature Department he was creating at the new University of Essex. He spent most of the next five years in England, where he published several collections of poems and wrote Book 1 of Gunslinger. He also started working with Gordon Brotherston on translations from Latin American texts, solidified his close friendship with British poet J.H. Prynne, and met his second wife, Jennifer Dunbar.

On returning to the United States, Dorn spent the 1970s as an academic migrant, teaching at over half a dozen universities across the country. In San Francisco, he collaborated with the printer and artist team of (Holbrook) Teter and (Michael) Myers on a number of projects, including the Bean News, the comic book format of Recollections of Gran Apachería', and the typesetting of the complete Gunslinger in 1974. In 1977 Dorn accepted a professorship at the University of Colorado at Boulder, where he taught for the rest of his life, directing the Creative Writing Program and editing the literary newspaper Rolling Stock (motto: “If It Moves Print It”) with his wife Jennifer.

Dorn was openly homophobic. His 1984 poem "Aid(e) Memoire" warned that those who "screw and are screwed...drink directly from the sewer." He inaugurated the "Aids Award for Poetry" in the same year, giving it to several leading gay poets.

During the 1990s, after a teaching exchange visit to Paul Valery University in Montpellier inspired an interest in the Cathars of Southern France, he started working on Languedoc Variorum: A Defense of Heresy and Heretics. He was also writing another long narrative poem Westward Haut. During the last two and a half years of his life, he wrote the poems for the posthumously published Chemo Sabe, reporting on his cancer treatments.

Dorn's main work, his magnum opus, is Gunslinger. Gunslinger is a long poem in five sections. Part 1 was first published in 1968, and the final complete text appeared in 1974. Other important publications include The Collected Poems: 1956-1974 (1975), Recollections of Gran Apacheria (1975), Abhorrences (1989), High West Rendezvous: A Sampler (1997), and [Way More West: New and Selected Poems] (2008).

Popular horror novelist Stephen King admired Dorn, describing his poetry as "talismans of perfect writing" and even naming the first novel of The Dark Tower series, "The Gunslinger", in honor of Dorn's poem. King opened both the prologue and epilogue of "The Stand" with Dorn's line, "We need help, the Poet reckoned."

== Death ==
Dorn died of pancreatic cancer on December 10, 1999, in Denver, Colorado. His papers are collected at the University of Connecticut as well as at Indiana University at Bloomington.

== Dorn's teaching career ==
During his life, Dorn taught at a number of institutions of higher learning, including Idaho State University at Pocatello (1961–65); the University of Essex in England (1965–70) as a Fulbright lecturer; Northeastern Illinois University at Chicago (1970–71); Kent State University, Ohio (1973–74); and the University of Colorado (1977–99). His second wife, Jennifer Dunbar Dorn, is an English filmmaker and writer Dorn met during his Essex years.

In the early 1970s, as a visiting poet at Kent State University, Dorn, along with British poet and editor Eric Mottram, was a mentor and supporter of the musical group Devo, and its founders Gerald Casale and Bob Lewis.

== Works ==
=== Poetry ===
- 1961: The Newly Fallen, New York: Totem Press
- 1964: Hands Up!, New York: Totem Press
- 1964: From Gloucester Out, London (U.K.): Matrix Press
- 1965: Idaho Out, London: Fulcrum Press
- 1965: Geography, London: Fulcrum Press
- 1967: The North Atlantic Turbine, London: Fulcrum Press
- 1968: Gunslinger, Black Sparrow Press
- 1969: Gunslinger: Book II, Black Sparrow Press
- 1969: The Midwest Is That Space Between the Buffalo Statler and the Lawrence Eldridge, T. Williams
- 1969: The Cosmology of Finding Your Spot, Cottonwood
- 1969: Twenty-four Love Songs, Frontier Press
- 1970: Gunslinger I & II, London: Fulcrum Press ISBN 978-0822309321
- 1970: Songs Set Two: A Short Count, Frontier Press, ISBN 978-0-686-05052-0
- 1971: The Cycle, Frontier Press
- 1971: A Poem Called Alexander Hamilton, Tansy/Peg Leg Press
- 1971: Spectrum Breakdown: A Microbook, Athanor Books
- 1972: The Hamadryas Baboon at the Lincoln Park Zoo, Wine Press
- 1972: Gunslinger, Book III: The Winterbook, Prologue to the Great Book IV Kornerstone, Frontier Press
- 1974: Recollections of Gran Apacheria, Turtle Island
- 1974: Slinger (contains Gunslinger, Books I-IV and "The Cycle"), Wingbow Press
- 1975: With Jennifer Dunbar, Manchester Square, Permanent Press
- 1975: Collected Poems: 1956-1974, Four Seasons Foundation
- 1976: "Hello, La Jolla", No Mountains Poetry Project Broadside Series, Evanston, Il, 1976
- 1978: Hello, La Jolla, Wingbow Press, ISBN 978-0-914728-24-5
- 1978: Selected Poems, edited by Donald Allen, Grey Fox Press
- 1981: Yellow Lola, Cadmus Editions
- 1983: Captain Jack's Chaps—Houston/MLA, Black Mesa Press
- 1989: Abhorrences, Black Sparrow Press
- 1993: The Denver Landing, Uprising Press
- 1996: High West Rendezvous: A Sampler
- 2001: Chemo Sábe, Limberlost Press
- 2007: Way More West: New & Selected Poems, edited by Michael Rothenberg, Penguin Books. ISBN 978-0-14-303869-6 (posthumous)
- 2012: Westward Haut, Etruscan Books (posthumous)
- 2012: Collected Poems, Carcanet Press (posthumous). ISBN 978-1847771261
- 2015: Derelict Air: From Collected Out, Enitharmon Editions (posthumous). ISBN 978-1-907587-78-8

=== Translations ===
- 1968: With Gordon Brotherston, Our Word: Guerilla Poems From Latin America, Grossman
- 1969: With Gordon Brotherston, Jose Emilio Pacheco, Tree Between Two Walls, Black Sparrow Press
- 1976: With Gordon Brotherston, Selected Poems of Cesar Vallejo, Penguin
- 1979: With Gordon Brotherston, Image of the New World, Thames & Hudson
- 1999: With Gordon Brotherston, Sun Unwound: Original Texts from Occupied America, North Atlantic Books,[4] anthology

=== Prose, fiction and essay ===
- 1960: What I See in the Maximus Poems, Migrant Press (criticism)
- 1964: Michael Rumaker and Warren Tallman, Prose 1, Four Seasons Foundation
- 1965: The Rites of Passage: A Brief History, Frontier Press
- 1966: The Shoshoneans: The People of the Basin-Plateau, Morrow, 66 pages
- 1969: Author of introduction, The Book of Daniel Drew [written in 1910 by Bouck White], Frontier Press
- 1969: By the Sound, Frontier Press; republished with a new preface by the author, Black Sparrow Press, 1991
- 1971: Some Business Recently Transacted in the White World (short stories), Frontier Press
- 1972: Bean News (newspaper, various authors, the 'secret book' of Gunslinger), Zephyrus Image
- 1976: The Poet, the People, the Spirit, Talonbooks
- 1978: Roadtesting the Language: An Interview with Ed Dorn, UC, San Diego
- 1980: Interviews, Four Seasons Press
- 1980: Views, Four Seasons Press
- 1993: Way West: Stories, Essays and Verse accounts, 1963–1993, Black Sparrow Press, includes the previously published (1974) Recollections of Gran Apacheria
- 2007: Ed Dorn Live: Lectures, Interviews, and Outtakes, edited by Joseph Richey, University of Michigan Press. ISBN 978-0-472-06862-3 (posthumous)
- 2012: Two Interviews, Shearsman Books (posthumous)
- 2013: Amiri Baraka and Edward Dorn: The Collected Letters, University of New Mexico Press. ISBN 9780826353917
