= Pedagogical Institute of Irkutsk State University =

Coordinates: 52°17′33″N 104°17′11″E

- Педагогический институт Иркутского государственного университета
- Former names: Irkutsk Teaching Institute (1909) East-Siberian Institute of People's Education (1918) Pedagogical Faculty of Irkutsk State University (1921) Irkutsk State Pedagogical Institute (1931) Irkutsk State Pedagogical University (1997) East-Siberian State Academy of Education (2009)
- Type: Public
- Established: 1909
- Parent institution: Irkutsk State University
- Director: Prof. Aleksandr Vladimirovich Semirov
- Academic staff: >200
- Students: >4000
- Location: Irkutsk, Irkutsk Oblast, Russia
- Language: Russian
- Website: pi.isu.ru

The Pedagogical Institute of Irkutsk State University (Russian: Педагоги́ческий институ́т Ирку́тского госуда́рственного университе́та) was founded in 1909 in Irkutsk, Siberia as Irkutsk Teaching Institute for training teachers for schools and colleges. The institute has 3 faculties and 21 departments, and provides education in 9 training directions. Minor plant 2585 Irpedina, discovered by Soviet astronomer and a graduate of the Institute Nikolay Chernykh, is named after the institute (Chernykh's wife, Lyudmila Chernykh, was also an astronomer and a graduate of the institute).
