= Gunslinger (poem) =

Poem by Ed Dom

Gunslinger is a six-part 1968 poem by Ed Dorn.

== History ==
Book I was first published in 1968, Book II in 1969, The Cycle ('Book 2 1/2') in 1971, The Winterbook (Book III) in 1972, Bean News (Gunslinger's 'secret book') in 1972, and 'Book IIII' as part of the complete Slinger (minus Bean News) in 1975. Gunslinger is Dorn's best-known work, and widely considered his most important.

== Summary ==
The gunslinger is a long form political poem about a demigod cowboy, a saloon madam, and a talking horse named Claude Levi-Strauss, who travel the Southwest in search of Howard Hughes.

The conversation stream of the poem is constantly interrupted. Dorn mixes the jargon of drug addicts, Westerners, and others to reflect the jumble of American speech. He seems to intentionally frustrate the reader; syntax is ambiguous, punctuation is sparse, and puns, homonyms, and nonsense words become an integral part of conversation.
