= Galway Kinnell =

American poet (1927–2014)

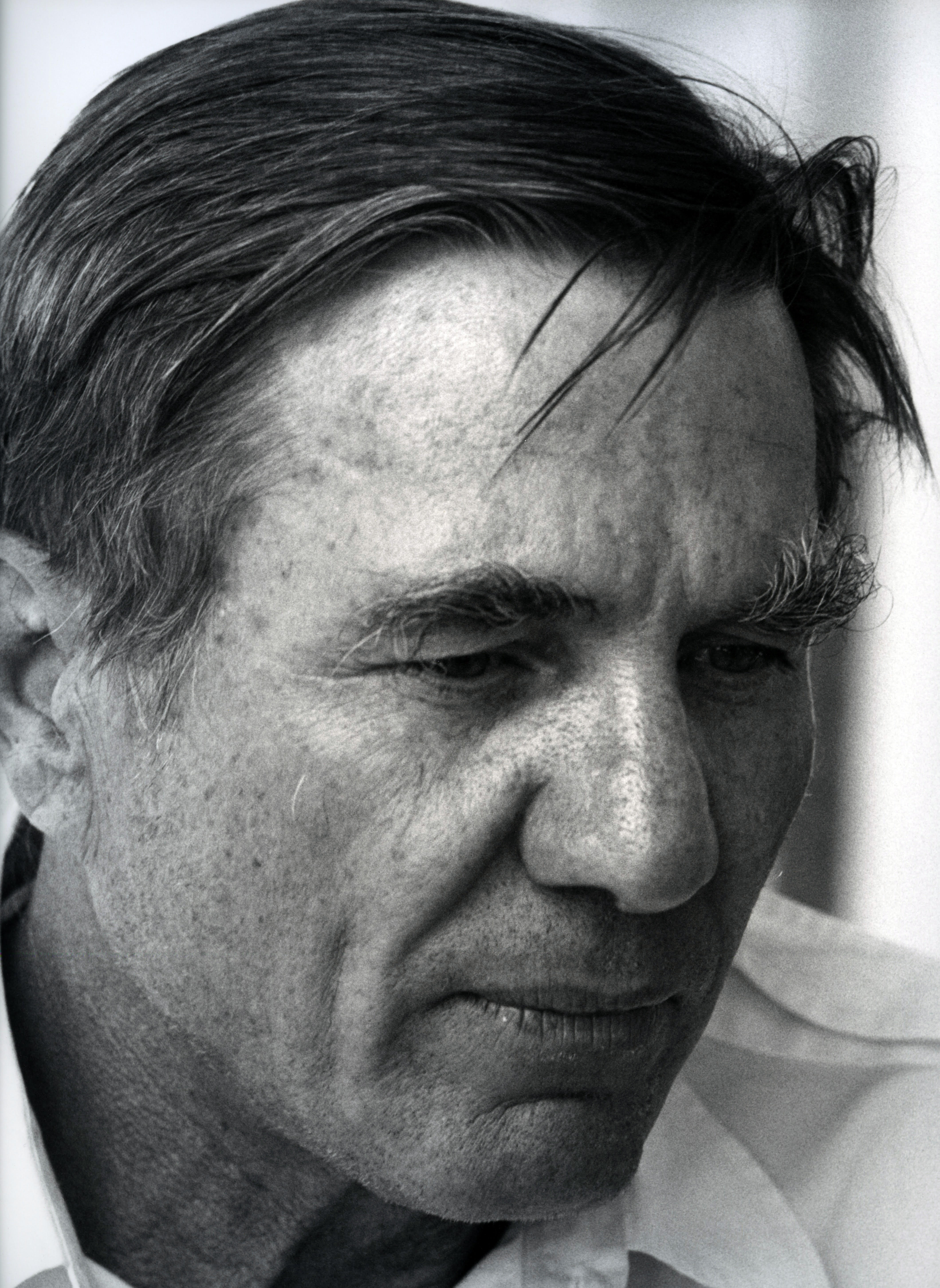
- Born: February 1, 1927; Providence, Rhode Island, U.S.
- Died: October 28, 2014 (aged 87); Sheffield, Vermont, U.S.
- Education: Princeton University (BA); University of Rochester (MA)
- Occupation: Poet
- Spouse: Barbara Bristol
- Website: galywaykinnell.com at the Wayback Machine (archived 2020-10-25)

Galway Mills Kinnell (February 1, 1927 – October 28, 2014) was an American poet. His dark poetry emphasized scenes and experiences in threatening, ego-less natural environments. He won the Pulitzer Prize for Poetry for his 1982 collection, Selected Poems and split the National Book Award for Poetry with Charles Wright. From 1989 to 1993, he was poet laureate for the state of Vermont.

Although exploring arguably darker themes, Kinnell has been regarded as being in line with Walt Whitman in his rejection of the idea of seeking personal fulfillment by escaping into the imaginary world. His most celebrated and commonly anthologized poems include the poem cycle The Book of Nightmares, as well as "St. Francis and the Sow", "After Making Love We Hear Footsteps", and "Wait".

== Biography ==
Galway Mills Kinnell was born in Providence, Rhode Island on February 1, 1927. He said that as a youth he became interested in the poetry of American dark Romantics such as Edgar Allan Poe and Emily Dickinson, drawn to both the musical appeal of their poetry and the allure of their use of language which spoke to what he later described as the homogeneous feel of his hometown, Pawtucket, Rhode Island. He also described himself as being an introvert in his adolescence, which scholars have compared to the aforementioned authors' histories of leading solitary lives.

Kinnell attended Wilbraham & Monson Academy in Wilbraham, Massachusetts and graduated in 1944. After graduating from the academy, he studied at Princeton University, graduating in 1948 alongside friend and fellow poet W.S. Merwin. He received his Master of Arts degree from the University of Rochester. He traveled extensively in Europe and the Middle East, and went to Paris on a Fulbright Fellowship. During the 1960s, the Civil Rights Movement in the United States caught his attention. Upon returning to the US, he joined CORE (Congress of Racial Equality) and worked on voter registration and workplace integration in Hammond, Louisiana. This effort got him arrested. In 1968, he signed the "Writers and Editors War Tax Protest" pledge, vowing to refuse tax payments in protest against the Vietnam War. Alongside other personal themes and anxieties, Kinnell drew upon both his involvement with the civil rights movement and his experiences protesting against the Vietnam War in his 1971 poem cycle The Book of Nightmares.

Galway Kinnell reading at Poets House, NYC, Sept. 26, 2009

From 1989 to 1993 he was poet laureate for the state of Vermont. Kinnell was the Erich Maria Remarque Professor of Creative Writing at New York University and a Chancellor of the Academy of American Poets. As of 2011 he was retired and resided at his home in Vermont until his death in October 2014 from leukemia.

== Work ==
While much of Kinnell's work has been regarded as dealing with social issues, it is by no means confined to one subject. Some critics have pointed to the spiritual dimensions of his poetry, as well as the natural imagery present throughout his work. For instance, "The Fundamental Project of Technology" deals with all three of those elements, creating an eerie, chant-like and surreal exploration of the horrors atomic weapons inflict on humanity and nature. Kinnell occasionally used simple and brutal images ("Lieutenant! / This corpse will not stop burning!" from "The Dead Shall be Raised Incorruptible" in The Book of Nightmares) to convey his anger at the destructiveness of humanity, informed by his activism and love of nature. Scholars have also identified, on the contrary, themes of optimism and beauty in his use of language, especially in the large role animals and children have in his later work, evident in poems such as "Daybreak" and "After Making Love We Hear Footsteps".

In addition to his works of poetry and his translations, Kinnell published one novel (Black Light, 1966) and one children's book (How the Alligator Missed Breakfast, 1982).

Kinnell wrote two elegies for his close friend, the poet James Wright, upon the latter's death in 1980. They appear in From the Other World: Poems in Memory of James Wright.

Kinnell's poem The Correspondence-School Instructor Says Goodbye to His Poetry Students was excerpted in Delia Owens’ novel Where the Crawdads Sing, as a goodbye note left by the protagonist's mother who left her at a young age.

== Personal ==
Kinnell married Inés Delgado de Torres, a Spanish translator, in 1965 – naming their two children, Fergus and Maud, after figures in Yeats. They divorced after 20 years of marriage. He married Barbara Kammer Bristol in 1997. He had two grandchildren.

== Death ==
Kinnell died October 28, 2014, at his home in Sheffield, Vermont, at the age of 87. The cause was leukemia according to his wife, Barbara K. Bristol.

== Bibliography ==
=== Poetry ===
==== Collections ====
- What a Kingdom It Was. Boston: Houghton Mifflin. 1960.
- Flower Herding on Mount Monadnock. Houghton Mifflin. 1964.
- Body Rags. Houghton Mifflin. 1968. UK edition: Rapp & Whiting, 1969 (Poetry USA series).
- The Book of Nightmares. Houghton Mifflin Harcourt. 1971. ISBN 978-0-395-12098-9. "Galway Kinnell."
- The Avenue Bearing the Initial of Christ into the New World: Poems 1946–64. Houghton Mifflin. 1974.
- "Saint Francis and the Sow" No Mountains Poetry Project Broadside Series (1976)
- Walking Down the Stairs (a collection of interviews) (1978).
- Mortal Acts, Mortal Words. Houghton Mifflin. 1980. ISBN 978-0-395-29125-2.
- Blackberry Eating. William B. Ewert. 1980.
- Selected Poems. Houghton Mifflin. 1982. ISBN 978-0-395-32045-7. Winner of the National Book Award and Pulitzer Prize, and included in Harold Bloom's The Western Canon.
- How the Alligator Missed Breakfast. Illustrator Lynn Munsinger. Houghton Mifflin. 1982. ISBN 978-0-395-32436-3.
- The Past. Houghton Mifflin. 1985. ISBN 978-0-395-39385-7.
- When One Has Lived a Long Time Alone. Knopf. 1990. ISBN 978-0-394-58856-8.
- Three Books. Houghton Mifflin Harcourt. 2002. ISBN 978-0-618-21911-7.
- Imperfect Thirst. Houghton Mifflin Harcourt. 1996. ISBN 978-0-395-75528-0.
- A New Selected Poems. Houghton Mifflin Harcourt. 2000. ISBN 978-0-618-15445-6. "Galway Kinnell." —finalist for the National Book Award
- The Avenue Bearing the Initial of Christ into the New World: Poems 1953–1964. Houghton Mifflin Harcourt. 2002. ISBN 978-0-618-21912-4.
- Strong Is Your Hold. Houghton Mifflin. 2006. ISBN 978-0-618-22497-5.
- Collected Poems. Houghton Mifflin Harcourt. 2017. ISBN 978-0-544-87521-0.

Translated collections

- Yves Bonnefoy (1968). On the motion and immobility of Douve. Translated by Galway Kinnell. Ohio University Press.
- François Villon (1982). The poems of François Villon. Translated by Galway Kinnell. UPNE. ISBN 978-0-87451-236-6.
- Yvan Goll (1970). Lackawanna Elegy. Translated by Galway Kinnell. Sumac Press. ISBN 978-0-912090-07-8.
- Yvan Goll (1968). Yvan Goll, Selected Poems. Translated by Paul Zweig; Jean Varda; Robert Bly; George Hitchcock; Galway Kinnell. Kayak Books.
- Rainer Maria Rilke (2000). Galway Kinnell (ed.). The Essential Rilke. Translated by Galway Kinnell; Hannah Liebmann. HarperCollins. ISBN 978-0-06-095654-7.

==== Poems ====
Title	Year	First published in	Reprinted/collected in
I, Coyote, stilled wonder	2013	The New Yorker 88/43 (January 14, 2013)	
The silence of the world	2013	The New Yorker 89/13 (May 13, 2013)	

=== Novels ===
- Black Light. Houghton Mifflin. 1966.
