= Wendy Mark =

- Born: 1950
- Known for: Printmaking, painting, drawing
- Website: wendymarkart.com

Wendy Mark (1950) is an American artist. In 1990 she was the recipient of a MacDowell residency.

Her work is in the collection of the Metropolitan Museum of Art
