= Alberto Vanasco =

Argentine novelist, poet and short fiction writer

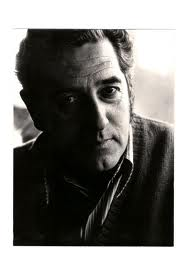
Alberto Vanasco

Alberto Vanasco (Buenos Aires, Argentina; 1925 – May 11, 1993) was an Argentine novelist, poet and short fiction writer.

== Biography ==
Alberto Vanasco was born in 1925 in Buenos Aires, Argentina. His family moved to San Juan to settle at an estate belonging to his grandfather on his mother's side as a consequence to the crisis of the 1930s, as his father lost his job at the Municipal Bank. There in San Juan, Alberto Vanasco started his primary education. In 1934, his family moved back to a suburb of Buenos Aires, and by 1939, he moved once again to the town of San Martin. Changing to different sites of residence, from the countryside to the suburbs, had a profound impact on the author's personality that was reflected on his poetry. During his studies at the Colegio Nacional de Buenos Aires he met other artists such as Mario Trejo, Aldo Cristiani, and César de Vedia. In 1943 he published his first book, a short novel entitled Justo en la cruz del camino (Just in the Way's Crossing).

After his father's death in 1944, his family returned to Buenos Aires; there Alberto Vanasco had different jobs: at the Transportation Corporation, at the Court, as private professor of mathematics, as a custom's officer, journalist, translator, among others. These jobs left on him an experience that he reflected on his poems and short stories.

In 1961 he travelled to New York, where he stood two years working for Crown Publishers. In 1968, he married Alicia Virginia Petti, with whom he travelled through Europe in 1972, and settled in Barcelona, at Alberto Cousté's house. From that moment he lived exclusively from his literary works and wrote television scripts. He published in the magazine Zona among other poets, and was professor of physics, mathematics, and literature. He participated in the vanguard literary movement. His job as a story teller adjusts to the necessity of renewing and broadening the possibilities of the novelistic language through new means or expressive instruments. He was pointed by critics as one of the Argentina writers that used the techniques of objectivism before this movement became widely known, his latter novelistic works comprise a trilogy in which this judgment is based: Sin embargo Juan vivía (Even Though Juan Lived, 1948); Para ellos la eternidad (Eternity for Them, 1957); Los muchos que no viven (The Many of Them Who Don't Live, 1964). In his poetic topics, identified with reality in different planes, it is evident a permanent interest and preoccupation for the political-social circumstances. He was president of the National Protecting Commission of Popular Libraries of Argentina (Conabip) from 1991 until his death. He died on May 11, 1993, in Buenos Aires.

== Works ==
- Novels
  - Justo en la cruz del camino (Just in the Crossroads, 1943)
  - Sin embargo Juan vivía (Nevertheless, Juan Lived, 1948)
  - Para ellos la eternidad (For Them is Eternity, 1957), that was later made a movie in 1964 titled Todo sol es amargo (Every Sun is Bitter), directed by Alfredo Mathé and starring Federico Luppi, Lautaro Murúa, Héctor Alterio, Elena Cánepa and Haydée Padilla.
  - Los muchos que no viven (The Many Who Don't Live, 1964)
  - Nueva York-Nueva York (New York-New York, 1967)
  - Otros verán el mar (Others Will See the Sea, 1977)
- Playwrights
  - No hay piedad para Hamlet (No Mercy for Hamlet, 1948), in collaboration with Mario Trejo, Buenos Aires Municipal Award, 1957, and Florencio Sánchez National Award, 1960.
- Poetry
  - 24 sonetos absolutos y dos intrascendentes (24 absolute sonnets and two intrascendental ones) (1945)
  - Cuartetos y tercetos definitivos (Definitive Quartets and Tercets)(1947)
  - Ella en general (She in General, 1954)
  - Canto rodado (Rolling Stone [a play on words that can also mean Rolling Song], 1962).
  - Sonetos (Sonnets, 1971), reedition of 24 sonetos absolutos y 2 intrascendentes and Cuartetos y Tercetos definitivos together.
- Short Fiction
  - Memorias del futuro (Memories of the Future, 1966), in collaboration with Eduardo Goligorsky.
  - Adiós al mañana (Goodbye to Tomorrow, 1967), in collaboration with Eduardo Goligorsky.
  - Memorias del futuro (1976), book that included three stories from the previous book under the same title, and five from Adiós al mañana, with new short stories.
  - Nuevas memorias del futuro (New Memories of the Future, 1977)
- Essay
  - Vida y obra de Hegel (Life and Works of Hegel, 1973)
