= Leonid Vasilyev =

Russian historian and sociologist (1930–2016)

- Born: Leonid Sergeyevich Vasilyev; October 9, 1930; Moscow, RSFSR, Soviet Union
- Died: October 6, 2016 (aged 85); Moscow, Russia

Leonid Sergeyevich Vasilyev (Russian: Леони́д Серге́евич Васи́льев; October 9, 1930 — October 6, 2016) was a Soviet and Russian historian, social scientist, religious scholar, sociologist, orientalist (sinologist) and Doctor of Historical Sciences.

Vasilyev was Head of the Laboratory of Historical Research and HSE (National Research University – Higher School of Economics) and until 2011, Head of the Department of General and National History and a professor. He began his tenure as the head of the sector of Theoretical Problems of the History of the East, then the Department of Oriental History of the Institute of Oriental Studies of the Russian Academy of Sciences and finally, the Institute's chief research officer.

He authored works devoted to the history and culture of China, the problems of Oriental studies and universal history - including the theory of the historical process - and the driving forces and dynamics of evolution. Among these works is a two-volume university textbook, History of the East, a six-volume textbook series on Universal History, monographs on the problems throughout ancient Chinese history, a textbook, History of Eastern Religions, and other books.

== Basic work ==
- Agrarian Relations and the Community in Ancient China (11th-7th centuries BC) (1961)
- Cults, Religions, Traditions in China (1970); 2nd edition (2001)
- Problems of the Genesis of Chinese Civilization. Formation of the Foundations of Material Culture and Ethnicity (1976)
- Problems of the Genesis of the Chinese State (1983)
- History of Eastern Religions (1988)
- Problems of the Genesis of Chinese Thought. Formation of the Foundations of Worldview and Mentality (1989)
- History of the East in 2 volumes (1993)
- Ancient China in 3 volumes
  - Prehistory, Shan-Yin, Western Zhou (until the 8th century BC). (1995)
  - Chunqiu Period (8th-5th centuries BC) (2000)
  - The Zhangguo Period (5th-3rd centuries BC) (2006)
- East and West in History (Basic Parameters of Problematics) // Alternative ways to civilization (2000)
- Evolution of the Society. Types of the Society and their Transformation (2011)
- Universal History in 6 volumes (2012-2013)
- History of Religions (2016)
