= Stephen Dunn =

American poet and educator (1939–2021)

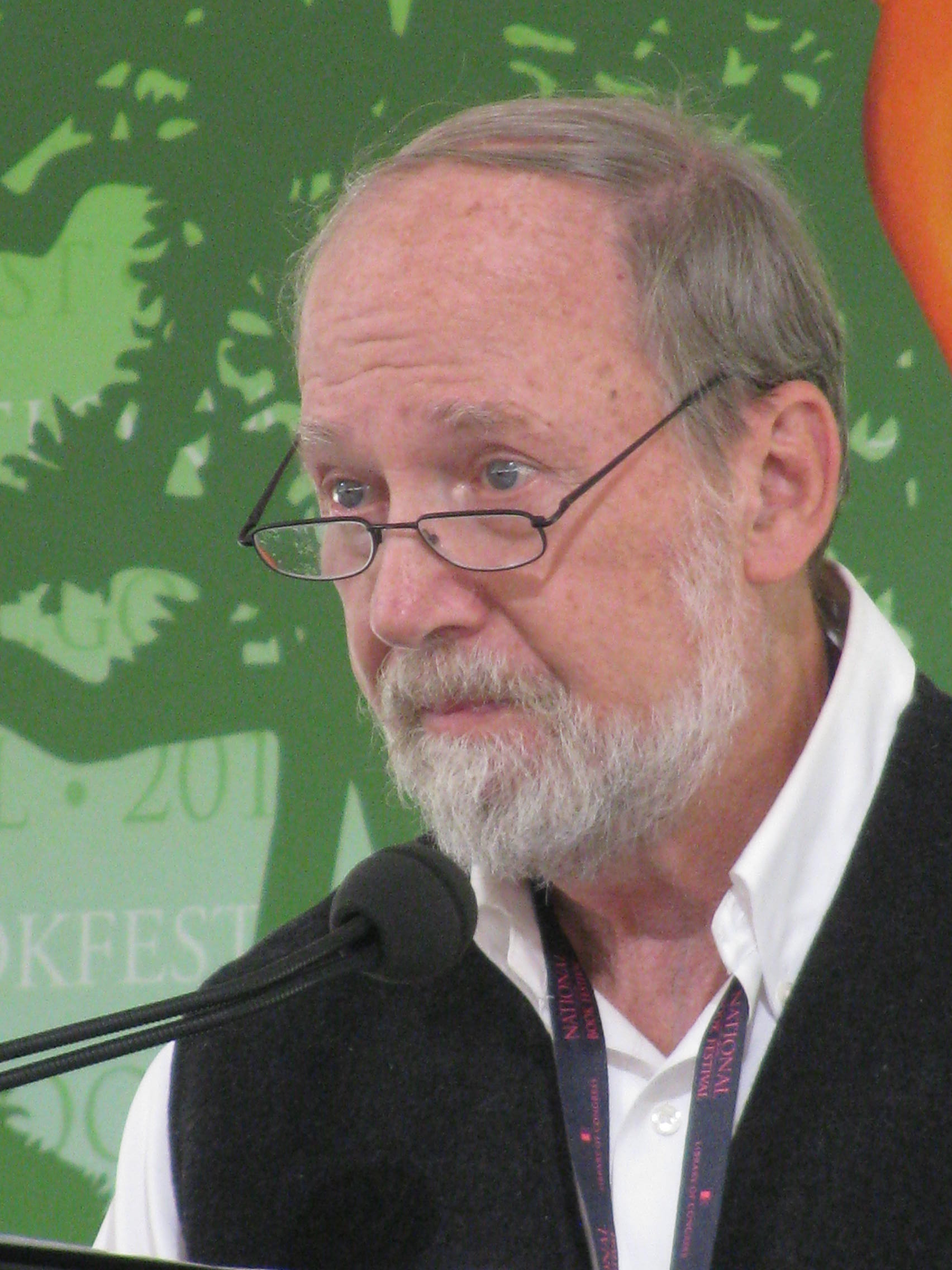
- Stephen Dunn at the 2012 National Book Festival
- Born: June 24, 1939; Forest Hills, Queens, New York, U.S.
- Died: June 24, 2021 (aged 82); Frostburg, Maryland, U.S.
- Education: Hofstra University (BA); Syracuse University (MFA)
- Occupations: Professor and poet
- Writing career
- Genre: Poetry
- Notable awards: Pulitzer Prize for Poetry; Academy Award in Literature from the American Academy of Arts and Letters

Stephen Elliot Dunn (June 24, 1939 – June 24, 2021) was an American poet and educator who authored twenty-one collections of poetry. He won the Pulitzer Prize for Poetry for his 2000 collection, Different Hours, and received an Academy Award in Literature from the American Academy of Arts and Letters. He also won three National Endowment for the Arts Creative Writing Fellowships, Guggenheim Fellowship, and Rockefeller Foundations Fellowship.

== Early life ==
Dunn was born in Forest Hills, Queens, New York on June 24, 1939. His parents were Ellen (Fleishman) and Charles Dunn. He attended Forest Hills High School, where he played basketball. After graduating in 1957, he studied history at Hofstra University. He played guard for its basketball team and was part of the squad that had a 23–1 record during the 1959–60 season. He was nicknamed "Radar" for his ability to make jump shots.

Dunn graduated from Hofstra University in 1962 and went on to play one season for the Williamsport Billies of the Eastern Basketball Association. He then worked in advertising until he was 26, when he traveled to Spain to pen a novel, which he ended up discarding. He subsequently undertook postgraduate studies at Syracuse University, obtaining a master's degree in creative writing in 1970.

== Career ==
Dunn began teaching at Stockton University in 1974 and published his first full-length collection entitled Looking for Holes in the Ceiling that same year. He continued working at Stockton for approximately three decades, and also taught at Wichita State University, University of Washington, Columbia University, University of Michigan, and Princeton University.

A collection of essays about Dunn's poetry was published in 2013. He finished his last book, The Not Yet Fallen World, shortly before his death. Dunn thought it was the best work he had written. It was published in May 2022, nearly a year after he died,

== Personal life ==
Dunn married his first wife, Lois Kelly, in 1964. Together, they had two children: Susanne and Andrea. They divorced in 2001. He married Barbara Hurd the following year.

Dunn had earlier lived in Port Republic, New Jersey. He later resided at homes in Ocean City, New Jersey, as well as Hurd's hometown of Frostburg, Maryland. He died on the night of his 82nd birthday at his home in Frostburg. He suffered from Parkinson's disease prior to his death.

== Selected bibliography ==
=== Poetry ===
==== Collections ====
- 5 impersonations. Marshall, Minn.: Ox Head Press. 1971. LCCN 79301667. OCLC 656950.
- Looking for holes in the ceiling : poems. Amherst, Mass.: University of Massachusetts Press. 1974. ISBN 9780870231544.
- Full of Lust and Good Usage, Carnegie-Mellon University Press (Pittsburgh, PA), 1976. ISBN 9780915604074
- A Circus of Needs, Carnegie-Mellon University Press (Pittsburgh, PA), 1978. ISBN 9780915604500
- Work and Love, Carnegie-Mellon University Press (Pittsburgh, PA), 1981. ISBN 9780915604609
- Not Dancing, Carnegie-Mellon University Press (Pittsburgh, PA), 1984. ISBN 9780887480003
- Local Time, Quill/Morrow (New York, NY), 1986. ISBN 9780688062965
- Between Angels: Poems, W. W. Norton & Company (New York, NY), 1989. ISBN 9780393026917
- Landscape at the End of the Century: Poems, W. W. Norton & Company (New York, NY), 1991. ISBN 9780393029727
- New and Selected Poems: 1974-1994, W. W. Norton & Company (New York, NY), 1994. ISBN 9780393313000
- Loosestrife: Poems, W. W. Norton & Company (New York, NY), 1996. ISBN 9780393316834
- Riffs & Reciprocities: Prose Pairs, W. W. Norton & Company (New York, NY), 1998. ISBN 9780393319576
- Different Hours, W. W. Norton & Company (New York, NY), 2000. ISBN 9780393322323
- The Insistence of Beauty: Poems, W. W. Norton & Company (New York, NY), 2004. ISBN 9780393059557
- Local Visitations: Poems, Norton, 2004, ISBN 9780393326031
- Everything Else in the World, W. W. Norton & Company (New York, NY), 2006. ISBN 9780393330380
- What Goes On: Selected and New Poems 1995-2009, W. W. Norton (New York, NY), 2009. ISBN 9780393338553
- Here and Now: Poems, W. W. Norton & Company (New York, NY), 2011. ISBN 9780393080216
- Lines of Defense, W. W. Norton & Company (New York, NY), 2014. ISBN 9780393240818
- Whereas: Poems, W. W. Norton & Company (New York, NY), 2017. ISBN 978-0393254679
- Pagan Virtues: Poems, W. W. Norton & Company (New York, NY), 2019. ISBN 978-1324002314
- The Not Yet Fallen World: New and Selected Poems. W. W. Norton & Company (New York, NY), 2022. ISBN 978-0-393-88225-4.

==== Selected list of poems ====
Title	Year	First published	Reprinted/collected	Ref
Ambush at five o'clock	2014	"Ambush at five o'clock". The New Yorker. 89 (47): 50–51. February 3, 2014.		—N/a
Salvation	2005	"Salvation". Poetry. November 1, 2005.		—N/a
Whereas the animal I cannot help but be	2015	"Whereas the animal I cannot help but be". The New Yorker. 90 (47): 33. February 9, 2015.		—N/a
Charlotte Bronte in Leeds Point	2003			
The Routine Things Around the House	2006			
The Kiss	2007			
Here and Now	2011			
Mrs. Cavendish and the Dancer	2014			
Glimpses	2018			

=== Non fiction ===
- Walking Light: Memoirs and Essays on Poetry, BOA Editions, Ltd., 2001. ISBN 9781929918003
- Degrees of Fidelity: Essays on Poetry and the Latitudes of the Personal, Tiger Bark Press, 2018. ISBN 9781732901209
