= Alfonso Molina =

Nicaraguan boxer

Personal information
- Full name: Alfonso Molina
- Born: 6 October 1944 (age 81) Managua, Nicaragua

Sport
- Sport: Boxing

Alfonso Molina (born 6 October 1944) is a Nicaraguan boxer. During his international sporting career, Molina was selected to compete for Nicaragua at the 1968 Summer Olympics for their first appearance at an Olympic Games. He competed in the men's lightweight event at the 1968 Summer Olympics. He received a bye in the first round and lost to Mongi Landhili in the second round by decision. Molina placed equal seventeenth overall with sixteen other competitors.

== Biography ==
Alfonso Molina was born on 6 October 1944 in Managua, Nicaragua. As an athlete, he competed for Nicaragua in international competition.

Molina was selected to compete for Nicaragua at the 1968 Summer Olympics held in Mexico City, Mexico, for Nicaragua's first appearance at any edition of the Olympic Games. With this, he was one of the first boxers to compete for Nicaragua at the Olympic Games. At the 1968 Summer Games, he competed in boxing in the men's lightweight category for competitors who weighed 60 kilograms (130 lb) or less. For the first round in the event held on 13 October 1968, Molina received a bye and was automatically entered into the second round. For the second round in the event held on 17 October 1968, he was assigned to fight in the fourth round. There, he was scheduled to fight against Mongi Landhili of Tunisia. At the end of the fight, Landhili was awarded the win by decision and advanced further into the third round, while Molina was eliminated from competition. For the official standings, Molina placed equal seventeenth with sixteen other competitors, namely: Marvin Arneson, Bayu Ayele, Dominique Azzaro, Inoua Bodia, Roberto Caminero, Jonathan Dele, Sayed Abdel Gadir, László Gula, Lee Chang-Gil, Luis Muñoz, Erik Nikkinen, Ramón Puello, Peter Rieger, Juan Rivero, and Tin Tun.
