= Boxing at the 1968 Summer Olympics – Lightweight =

Boxing competitions

The Lightweight class in the boxing competition was the fifth-lowest weight class. Lightweights were limited to those boxers weighing a maximum of 60 kilograms (132.3 lbs). 37 boxers qualified for this category. Like all Olympic boxing events, the competition was a straight single-elimination tournament. Both semifinal losers were awarded bronze medals, so no boxers competed again after their first loss. Bouts consisted of six rounds each. Five judges scored each bout.

== Medalists ==
Gold	Ronnie Harris; United States
Silver	Józef Grudzień; Poland
Bronze	Zvonimir Vujin; Yugoslavia
Bronze	Calistrat Cuțov; Romania

== Schedule ==
Date	Round
Sunday, October 13, 1968	First round
Thursday, October 17, 1968	Second round
Sunday, October 20, 1968	Third round
Wednesday, October 23, 1968	Quarterfinals
Thursday, October 24, 1968	Semifinals
Saturday, October 26, 1968	Final Bout

== Draw ==
=== Finals ===
Semifinals		Final
Ronnie Harris (USA)	5
Calistrat Cuțov (ROU)	0	Ronnie Harris (USA)	5
Zvonimir Vujin (YUG)	0	Józef Grudzień (POL)	0
Józef Grudzień (POL)	5

=== Top half ===
First round

Second round
Stoiane Pilitchev (BUL)	5
Bayu Ayele (ETH)	0
Antonio Durán (MEX)	RSC
Dominique Azzaro (FRA)
Calistrat Cuțov (ROU)	5
Erik Nikkinen (FIN)	0
Mongi Landhili (TUN)	5
Alfonso Molina (NCA)	0
Ronnie Harris (USA)	5
Lee Chang-gil (KOR)	0
John Stracey (GBR)	3
Marvin Arneson (CAN)	2
Mohamed Muruli (UGA)	5
Luis Muñoz (CHI)	0
Armando Mendoza (VEN)	RSC
Ramón Puello (DOM)

Third round
Stoiane Pilitchev (BUL)	4
Antonio Durán (MEX)	1
Calistrat Cuțov (ROU)	5
Mongi Landhili (TUN)	0
Ronnie Harris (USA)	4
John Stracey (GBR)	1
Mohamed Muruli (UGA)	4
Armando Mendoza (VEN)	1

Quarterfinals
Stoiane Pilitchev (BUL)	1
Calistrat Cuțov (ROU)	4
Ronnie Harris (USA)	5
Mohamed Muruli (UGA)	0

Final
Ronnie Harris (USA)	5
Calistrat Cuțov (ROU)	0

=== Bottom half ===
First round
Józef Grudzień (POL)	5
Ho Su-lung (TPE)	0
Dele Jonathan (NGR)	5
Marcos Chinea (ESP)	0
Enzo Petriglia (ITA)	3
Joe Martey (GHA)	2
Abdel Sheed (SUD)	5
Eugenio Febus (PUR)	0
Pedro Agüero (ARG)	3
Rodolfo Arpón (PHI)	2

Second round
Luis Minami (PER)	KO-2
Tin Tun (BIR)
Yeter Sevimlı (TUR)
Juan Rivero (URU)	DSQ
Valery Belousov (URS)	RSC
László Gula (HUN)
Zvonimir Vujin (YUG)	3
Peter Rieger (GDR)	2
Anthony Quinn (IRL)	KO-1
Inoua Bodia (CMR)
Roberto Caminero (CUB)	0
Józef Grudzień (POL)	5
Dele Jonathan (NGR)	0
Enzo Petriglia (ITA)	5
Abdel Sheed (SUD)	0
Pedro Agüero (ARG)	5

Third round
Luis Minami (PER)	3
Yeter Sevimli (TUR)	2
Valery Belousov (URS)	0
Zvonimir Vujin (YUG)	5
Anthony Quinn (IRL)	1
Józef Grudzień (POL)	4
Enzo Petriglia (ITA)	3
Pedro Agüero (ARG)	2

Quarterfinals
Luis Minami (PER)	0
Zvonimir Vujin (YUG)	4
Józef Grudzień (POL)	5
Enzo Petriglia (ITA)	0

Semifinals
Zvonimir Vujin (YUG)	0
Józef Grudzień (POL)	5
