= Boxing at the 1964 Summer Olympics – Lightweight =

Boxing competitions

The lightweight class in the boxing at the 1964 Summer Olympics competition was the fourth-lightest class. Lightweights were limited to those boxers weighing less than 60 kilograms. 34 boxers from 34 nations competed.

== Medallists ==
Gold	Jozef Grudzien; Poland
Silver	Vellikton Barannikov; Soviet Union
Bronze	Ronald Allen Harris; United States
Bronze	Jim McCourt; Ireland

== Results ==
Round of 64; 11 October
Odhiambo (UGA)	W
You (CAM)	RSC
Mekonnen (ETH)	0
Serrano (MEX)	5

Round of 32; 14 October
Halonen (FIN)	1
Grudzien (POL)	4
Arcari (ITA)	RSC
Oundo (KEN)	W
Pilitchev (BUL)	W
Pakandam (IRI)	RSC
Achy Assi (CIV)	2
Palmer (CAN)	3
Hassan (EGY)	L
Harris (USA)	KO
Amekudji (GHA)	L
Shiratori (JPN)	KO
Dunne (GBR)	4
Hita (CUB)	1
Krogh (DEN)	1
Arpon (PHI)	4
Sarwar (PAK)	5
Cotot (FRA)	0
McCourt (IRL)	4
Suh (KOR)	1
Pace (ARG)	W
Donovan (NZL)	RSC
Barrera (ESP)	4
Schmitt (EUA)	1
Wang (ROC)	RSC
Blair (AUS)	W
Barannikov (URS)	4
Zuñiga (CHI)	1
Ramparsad (NEP)	RSC
Kajdi (HUN)	W
Odhiambo (UGA)	5
Serrano (MEX)	0

Round of 16; 18 October
Grudzien (POL)	4
Oundo (KEN)	1
Pilitchev (BUL)	5
Palmer (CAN)	0
Harris (USA)	5
Shiratori (JPN)	0
Dunne (GBR)	1
Arpon (PHI)	4
Sarwar (PAK)	1
McCourt (IRL)	4
Pace (ARG)	1
Barrera (ESP)	4
Blair (AUS)	0
Barannikov (URS)	5
Kajdi (HUN)	5
Odhiambo (UGA)	0

Quarterfinals; 20 October
Grudzien (POL)	5
Pilitchev (BUL)	0
Harris (USA)	5
Arpon (PHI)	0
McCourt (IRL)	4
Barrera (ESP)	1
Barannikov (URS)	W
Kajdi (HUN)	RSC

Semifinals; 21 October
Grudzien (POL)	4
Harris (USA) (bronze)	1
McCourt (IRL) (bronze)	2
Barannikov (URS)	3

Final; 23 October
Grudzien (POL) (gold)	5
Barannikov (URS) (silver)	0

== Sources ==
Tokyo Organizing Committee (1964). The Games of the XVIII Olympiad: Tokyo 1964, vol. 2.
