= Campbell Palmer =

Canadian boxer

Personal information
- Born: 29 April 1936 Loon Lake, Saskatchewan, Canada
- Died: 9 February 2007 (aged 70)

Sport
- Sport: Boxing

Campbell Roger "Buddy" Palmer (29 April 1936 – 9 February 2007) was a Canadian boxer. He competed in the men's lightweight event at the 1964 Summer Olympics. At the 1964 Summer Olympics, he defeated Gabriel Achy Assi of the Ivory Coast, before losing to Stoyan Pilichev of Bulgaria. Prior to competing at the Olympics, he competed in Haney, British Columbia and 100 Mile House, British Columbia.
