= Józef Grudzień =

Polish boxer (1939–2017)

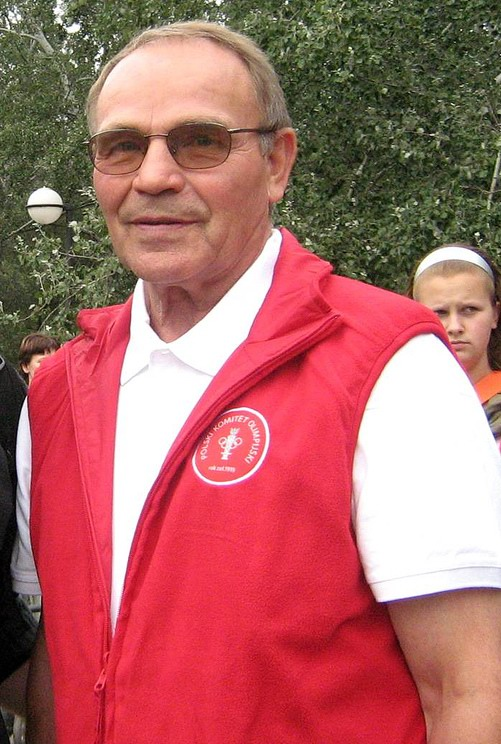

Medal record

Men's Boxing

Representing Poland

Olympic Games
| Gold medal – first place | 1964 Tokyo | Lightweight |
| Silver medal – second place | 1968 Mexico City | Lightweight |

European Amateur Championships
| Gold medal – first place | 1967 Rome | Lightweight |
| Silver medal – second place | 1965 East Berlin | Lightweight |

Józef Grudzień (1 April 1939 – 17 June 2017) was a Polish boxer.

Grudzień was born 1 April 1939 in Piasek Wielki, Poland, which is near Busko-Zdrój. He won two medals at the Olympic Games: gold in the Lightweight division at Tokyo in 1964 and silver at Mexico City in 1968. He also twice won medals at the European Amateur Boxing Championships, silver at East Berlin in 1965 and gold at Rome in 1967.

Grudzień won the Aleksander Reksza Boxing Award in 1991.

== 1964 Olympic results ==
Below are the results of Jozef Grudzień, a lightweight boxer who competed for Poland at the 1964 Tokyo Olympics:

- Round of 32: Defeated Tauno Halonen (Finland) by decision, 4–1
- Round of 16: Defeated Alex Oundo (Kenya) by decision, 4–1
- Quarterfinal: Defeated Stoyan Pilitchev (Bulgaria) by decision, 5–0
- Semifinal: Defeated Ronnie Harris (United States) by decision, 4–1
- Final: Defeated Velikton Barannikov (Soviet Union) by decision, 5–0 (won gold medal)

== 1968 Olympic results ==
Below are the results of Jozef Gudzień, a lightweight boxer who competed for Poland at the 1968 Mexico Olympics:

- Round one: Defeated Ho Su-Lung (Taiwan) by decision, 5-0
- Round two: Defeated Roberto Caminero (Cuba) by decision, 5-0
- Round three: Defeated Marty Quinn (Ireland) by decision, 4-1
- Quarterfinal: Defeated Enzo Petriglia (Italy) by decision, 5-0
- Semifinal: Defeated Zvonko Vujin (Yugoslavia) by decision, 5-0
- Final: Lost Ronnie Harris by decision, 0-5 (won silver medal)
