= Ronald Allen Harris =

American boxer (1947–1980)

Medal record

Men's boxing

Representing United States

Olympic Games
Bronze medal – third place	1964 Tokyo	Lightweight

Ronald Allen Harris (February 8, 1947 – December 31, 1980) was an American boxer who competed at the 1964 Summer Olympics in Tokyo.

Harris was born in Detroit, Michigan, where he attended Chadsey High School.

== Amateur career ==
Harris won the National AAU Lightweight title in 1964, earning him an Olympic team birth. Boxing at 132 pounds, Harris captured the bronze medal at the 1964 Tokyo Olympiad.

=== 1964 Olympic results ===
- Round of 64: bye
- Round of 32: Defeated Fawzi Hassan (United Arab Republic/Egypt) KO
- Round of 16: Defeated Kanemaru Shiratori (Japan) 5-0
- Quarterfinal: Defeated Rodolfo Arpon (Philippines) 5-0
- Semifinal: Lost to Jozef Grudzien (Poland) 1-4 (was awarded bronze medal)

== Professional career ==
Harris turned professional in 1965 and won his first 19 fights before he lost a decision to Shinichi Kadota. He retired in 1973, having never fought for a world title.

1973-09-22 Arturo Zuniga Toronto, ON, Canada L PTS 10

1973-08-20 Peter Cobblah Las Vegas, NV, USA W PTS 10

1973-07-10 Horacio Agustin Saldano Buenos Aires, Argentina L PTS 10

1973-04-29 Bobby Hayman Detroit, MI, USA W PTS 10

1972-08-21 Alvin Phillips New Orleans, LA, USA L PTS 10

1972-07-22 Papo Villa Detroit, MI, USA W PTS 10

1972-03-25 Raul Soriano Detroit, MI, USA W PTS 10

1972-01-14 Percy Pugh Detroit, MI, USA W UD 10

1971-10-29 Don Cobbs Detroit, MI, USA W KO 3

1969-06-12 Shinichi Kadota Los Angeles, CA, USA L SD 10

1969-04-18 Frank Steele Detroit, MI, USA W PTS 12

1969-04-10 Manuel Lugo Los Angeles, CA, USA W PTS 6

1969-02-14 Jesus Alicia Indianapolis, IN, USA W KO 3

1968-12-04 Arnold Bushman (Bush) Indianapolis, IN, USA W KO 2

1968-11-26 Frank Steele Detroit, MI, USA W PTS 8

1968-07-24 Brad Silas Detroit, MI, USA W PTS 10

1968-07-18 Pulga Serrano Los Angeles, CA, USA W UD 10

1968-06-28 Primus Williams Akron, OH, USA W PTS 6

1968-06-21 Primus Williams Buffalo, NY, USA W PTS 6

1967-08-24 Rudy Richardson Detroit, MI, USA W PTS 6

1967-05-06 Clyde Tyler Huntington, WV, USA W PTS 8

1967-04-03 Roger Evans Baltimore, MD, USA W PTS 6

1967-03-27 Howard Moore Norfolk, VA, USA W PTS 6

1966-11-21 Larry Youngblood Detroit, MI, USA W KO 1

1966-11-16 Larry Youngblood Canton, OH, USA W PTS 6

1966-08-29 Rudy Richardson Detroit, MI, USA W PTS 6

1966-04-02 Al Massey Baltimore, MD, USA W PTS 6

1966-03-04 Billy Lloyd Baltimore, MD, USA D PTS 6

1965-05-07 Willie Cooper Wheeling, WV, USA W KO 6

Record to date: Won 24 (KOs 5) Lost 4 Drawn 1 Total 29
