= Stary Korczyn =

- Village
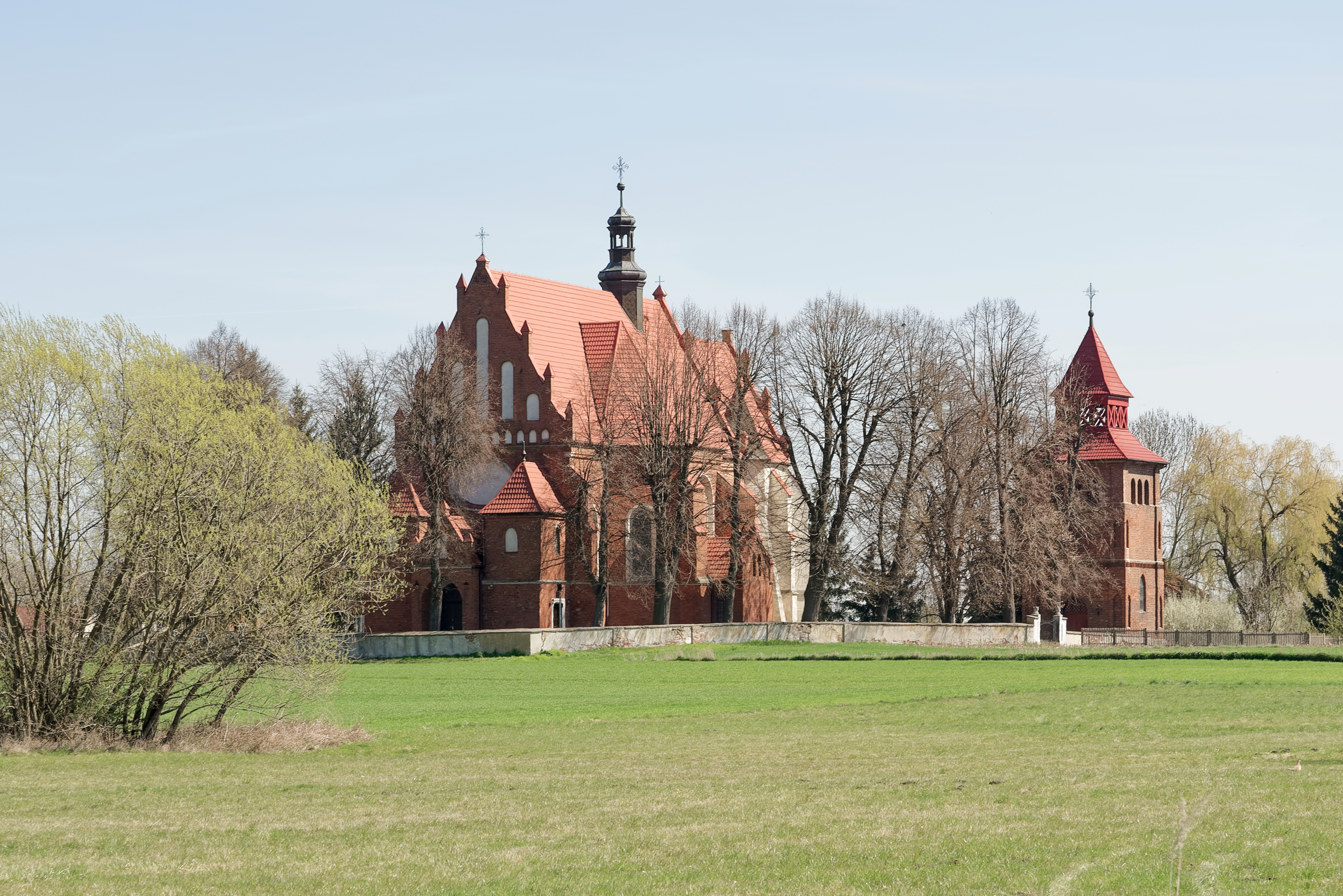
- St. Nicholas' Church in Stary Korczyn

- Location within Poland
- Coordinates: 50°18′N 20°45′E
- Country: Poland
- Voivodeship: Świętokrzyskie
- County: Busko
- Gmina: Nowy Korczyn
- Population: 304

Stary Korczyn [ˈstarɨ ˈkɔrt͡ʂɨn] is a village in the administrative district of Gmina Nowy Korczyn, within Busko County, Świętokrzyskie Voivodeship, in south-central Poland. It lies approximately 5 km (3 mi) west of Nowy Korczyn, 19 km (12 mi) south of Busko-Zdrój, and 66 km (41 mi) south of the regional capital Kielce.

Stary Korczyn was the subject of a well-known painting from World War I, Erstürmung des Dorfes Stary Korczyn durch das Landsturminfanterieregiment Nr. 1, 22. Dez. 1914 (Attack on the Village of Stary Korczyn by the Vienna First Infantry Regiment on December 22, 1914), by Alfred Basel, now hanging in the Heeresgeschichtliches Museum, Vienna.
