= Błotnowola =

- Village
- Location within Poland
- Coordinates: 50°20′N 20°56′E
- Country: Poland
- Voivodeship: Świętokrzyskie
- County: Busko
- Gmina: Nowy Korczyn
- Population: 1,339

Błotnowola [bwɔtnɔˈvɔla] is a village in the administrative district of Gmina Nowy Korczyn, within Busko County, Świętokrzyskie Voivodeship, in south-central Poland. It lies approximately 10 km (6 mi) north-east of Nowy Korczyn, 22 km (14 mi) south-east of Busko-Zdrój, and 65 km (40 mi) south of the regional capital Kielce.
