= Łęka, Świętokrzyskie Voivodeship =

Łęka
- Village
- Location within Poland
- Coordinates: 50°17′21″N 20°49′38″E
- Country: Poland
- Voivodeship: Świętokrzyskie
- County: Busko
- Gmina: Nowy Korczyn
- Population: 175

Łęka [ˈwɛnka] is a village in the administrative district of Gmina Nowy Korczyn, within Busko County, Świętokrzyskie Voivodeship, in south-central Poland. It lies approximately 2 km (1 mi) south-east of Nowy Korczyn, 22 km (14 mi) south of Busko-Zdrój, and 68 km (42 mi) south of the regional capital Kielce.
