= Grotniki Małe =

- Village
- Location within Poland
- Coordinates: 50°18′44″N 20°50′14″E
- Country: Poland
- Voivodeship: Świętokrzyskie
- County: Busko
- Gmina: Nowy Korczyn
- Population: 347

Grotniki Małe [ɡrɔtˈniki ˈmawɛ] is a village in the administrative district of Gmina Nowy Korczyn, within Busko County, Świętokrzyskie Voivodeship, in south-central Poland. It lies approximately 3 km (2 mi) north-east of Nowy Korczyn, 20 km (12 mi) south-east of Busko-Zdrój, and 66 km (41 mi) south of the regional capital Kielce.
