= Marcos Chinea =

Spanish boxer

Personal information
- Nationality: Spanish
- Born: 12 June 1950 (age 74); La Gomera, Spain

Sport
- Sport: Boxing

Marcos Chinea (born 12 June 1950) is a Spanish boxer. He competed in the men's lightweight event at the 1968 Summer Olympics. At the 1968 Summer Olympics, he lost to Jonathan Dele of Nigeria.
