= Tunisia at the 1968 Summer Olympics =

- IOC code: TUN
- NOC: Tunisian Olympic Committee

in Mexico City
- Competitors: 7 in 2 sports
- Flag bearer: Habib Galhia
- Medals Ranked 28th: Gold 1 Silver 0 Bronze 1 Total 2

Summer Olympics appearances (overview)
- 1960; 1964; 1968; 1972; 1976; 1980; 1984; 1988; 1992; 1996; 2000; 2004; 2008; 2012; 2016; 2020; 2024

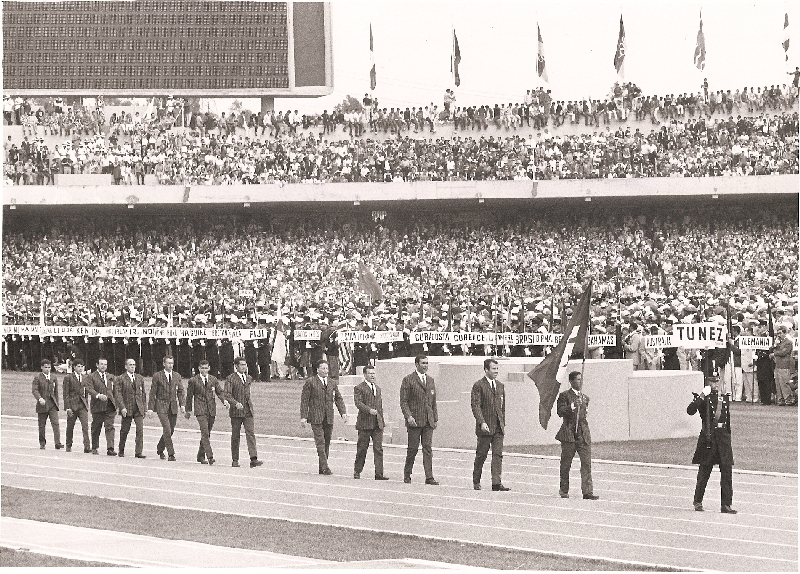
Parade of the Tunisian delegation during the opening ceremony of the 1968 Summer Olympics in Mexico

Tunisia competed at the 1968 Summer Olympics in Mexico City, Mexico.

== Medalists ==
=== Gold ===
- Mohammed Gammoudi — Athletics Men's 5000 metres

=== Bronze ===
- Mohammed Gammoudi — Athletics Men's 10000 metres

== Athletics ==
Men
Track & road events

Athlete	Event	Heat		Quarterfinal		Semifinal		Final	
Athlete	Event	Result	Rank	Result	Rank	Result	Rank	Result	Rank
Mohammed Gammoudi	5000 m	14:29.0	2 Q	—N/a				14:05.0	Gold medal
Mohammed Gammoudi	10,000 m	—N/a						29:34.2	Bronze medal
Labidi Ayachi	3000 m steeplechase	9:24.62	6	did not advance					
Ahmed Zammel	5000 m	14:54.0	6	did not advance					

== Boxing ==
Men

Athlete	Event	1 Round	2 Round	3 Round	Quarterfinals	Semifinals	Final
Athlete	Event	Opposition Result	Opposition Result	Opposition Result	Opposition Result	Opposition Result	Rank
Mahmoud Ladjili	Bantamweight	BYE	Domingo Casco (ARG); L 2-3	did not advance			
Mouldi Manai	Featherweight	Abdel Khallaf (EGY); L 1-4	did not advance				
Mongi Landhili	Lightweight	BYE	Alfonso Molina (NCA); W 5-0	Calistrat Cuțov (ROU); L 0-5	did not advance		
Habib Galhia	Light-welterweight	Adalberto Siebens (PUR); W 5-0	Antoniu Vasile (ROU); L WO	did not advance			
