= Czarkowy =

- Village
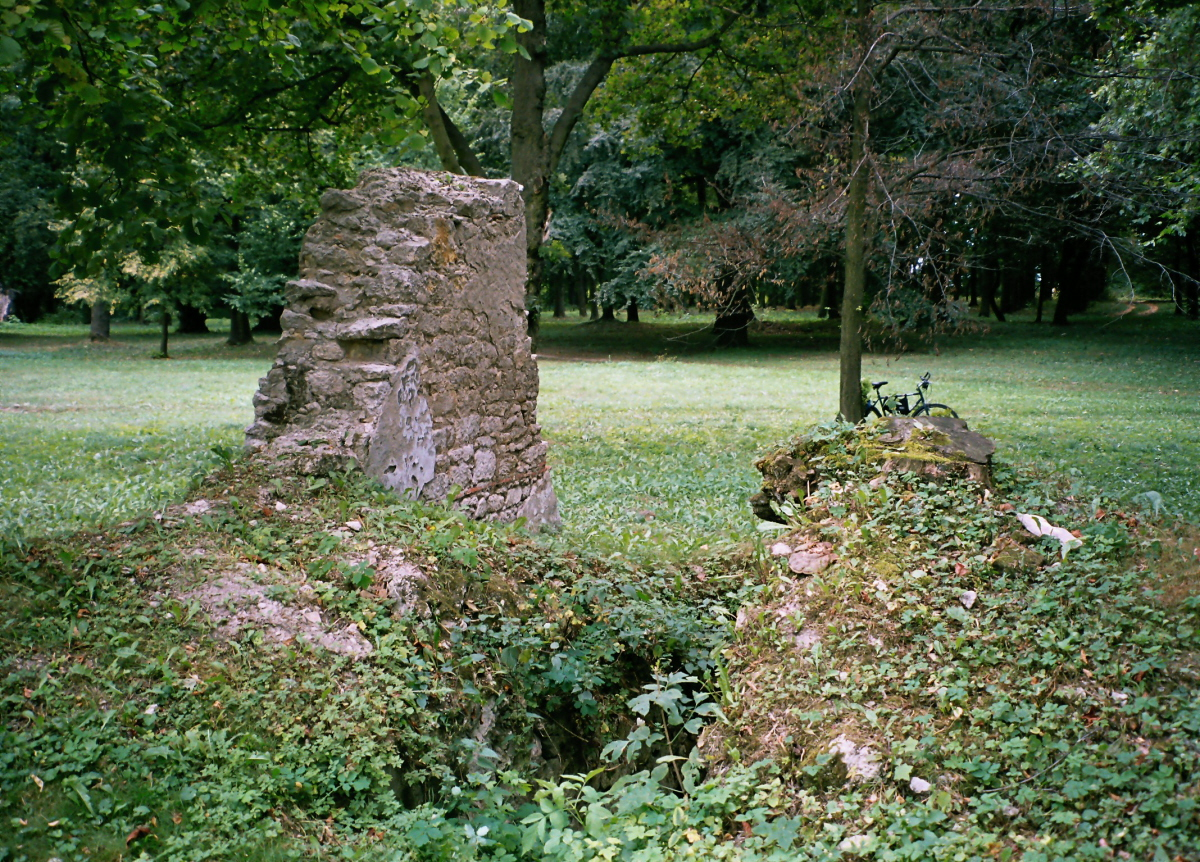

- Location within Poland
- Coordinates: 50°18′N 20°43′E
- Country: Poland
- Voivodeship: Świętokrzyskie
- County: Busko
- Gmina: Nowy Korczyn
- Population: 433

Czarkowy [t͡ʂarˈkɔvɨ] is a village in the administrative district of Gmina Nowy Korczyn, within Busko County, Świętokrzyskie Voivodeship, in south-central Poland. It lies approximately 7 km (4 mi) west of Nowy Korczyn, 19 km (12 mi) south of Busko-Zdrój, and 66 km (41 mi) south of the regional capital Kielce.

Manor house in Czarkowy

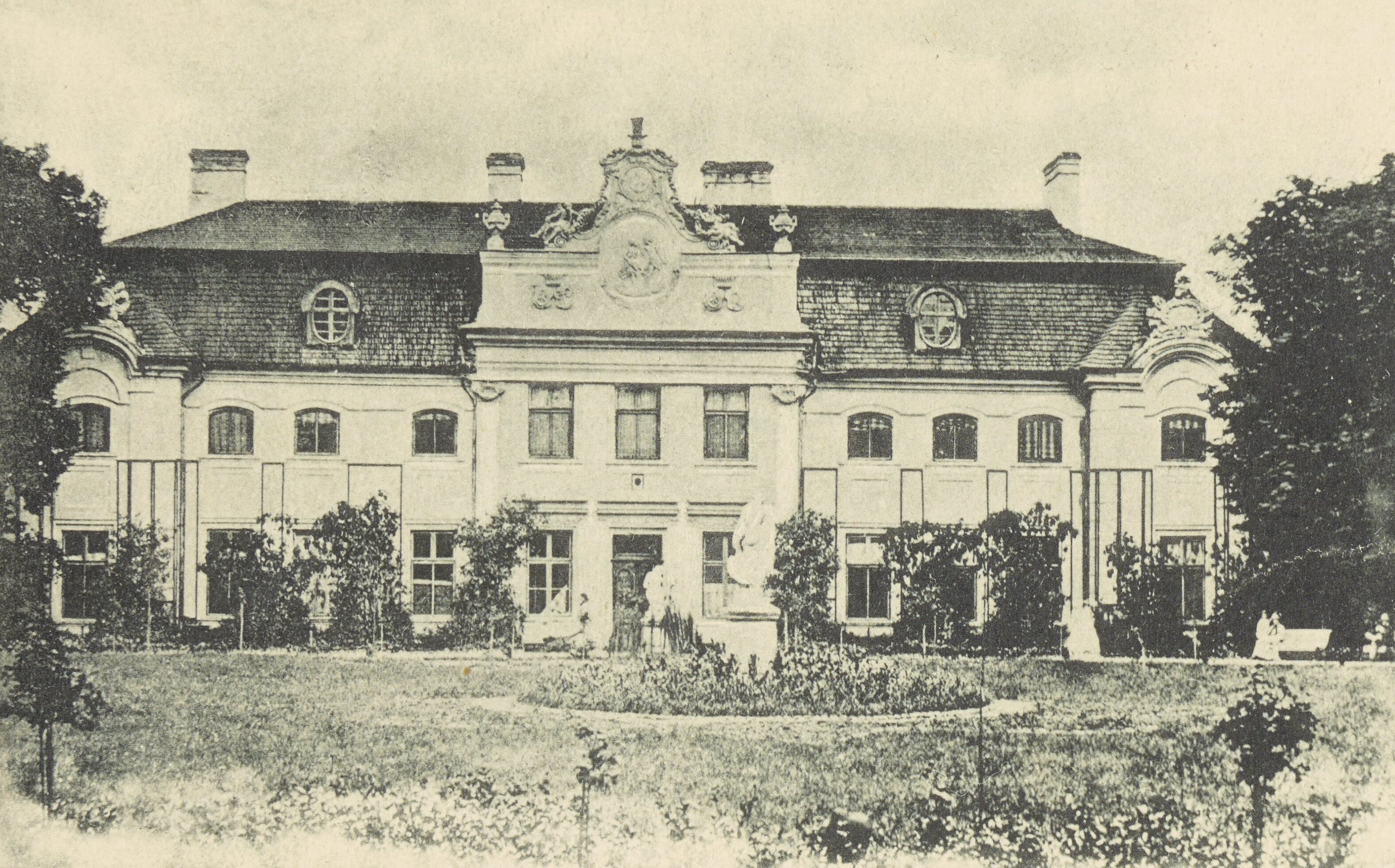
Before 1906

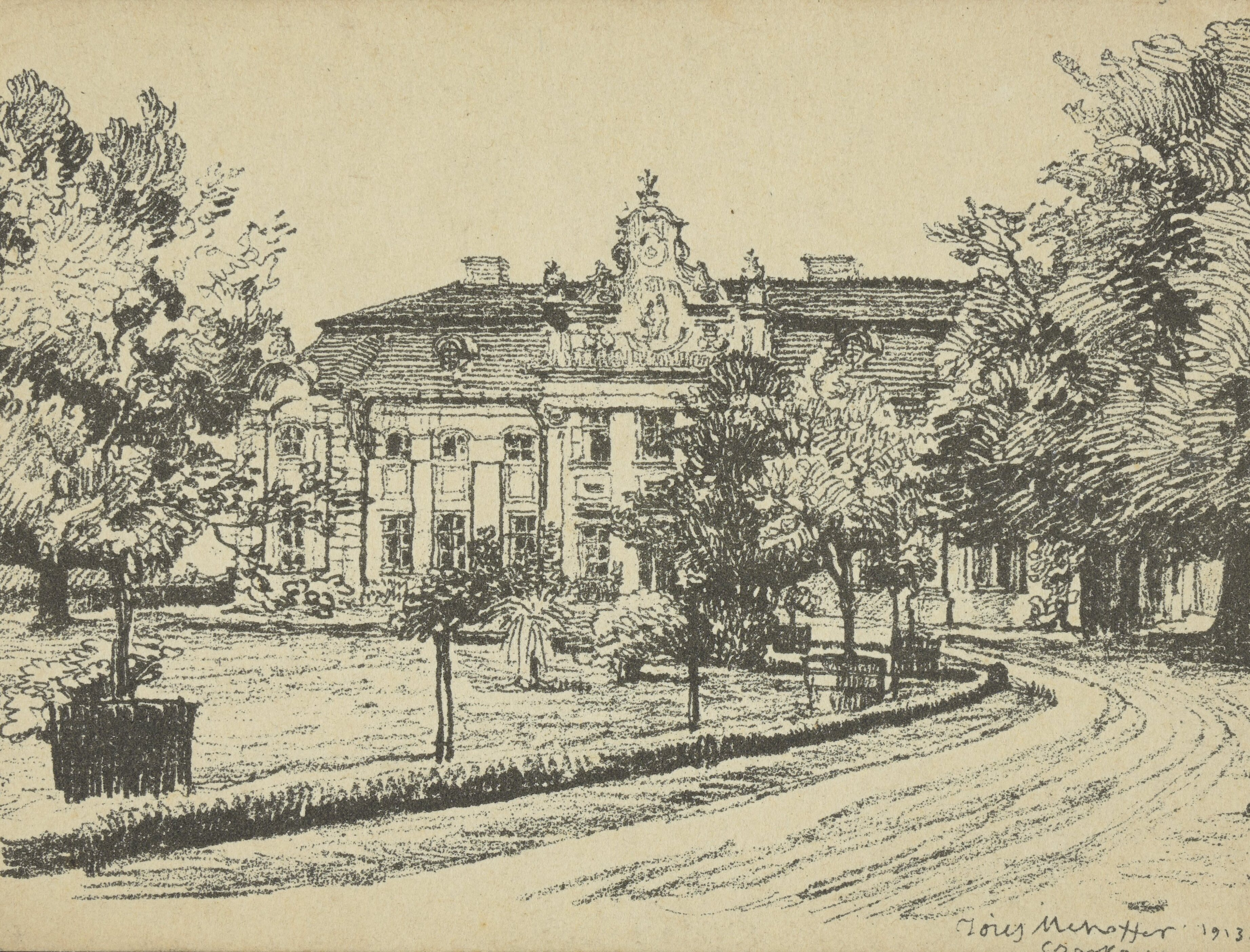
1913

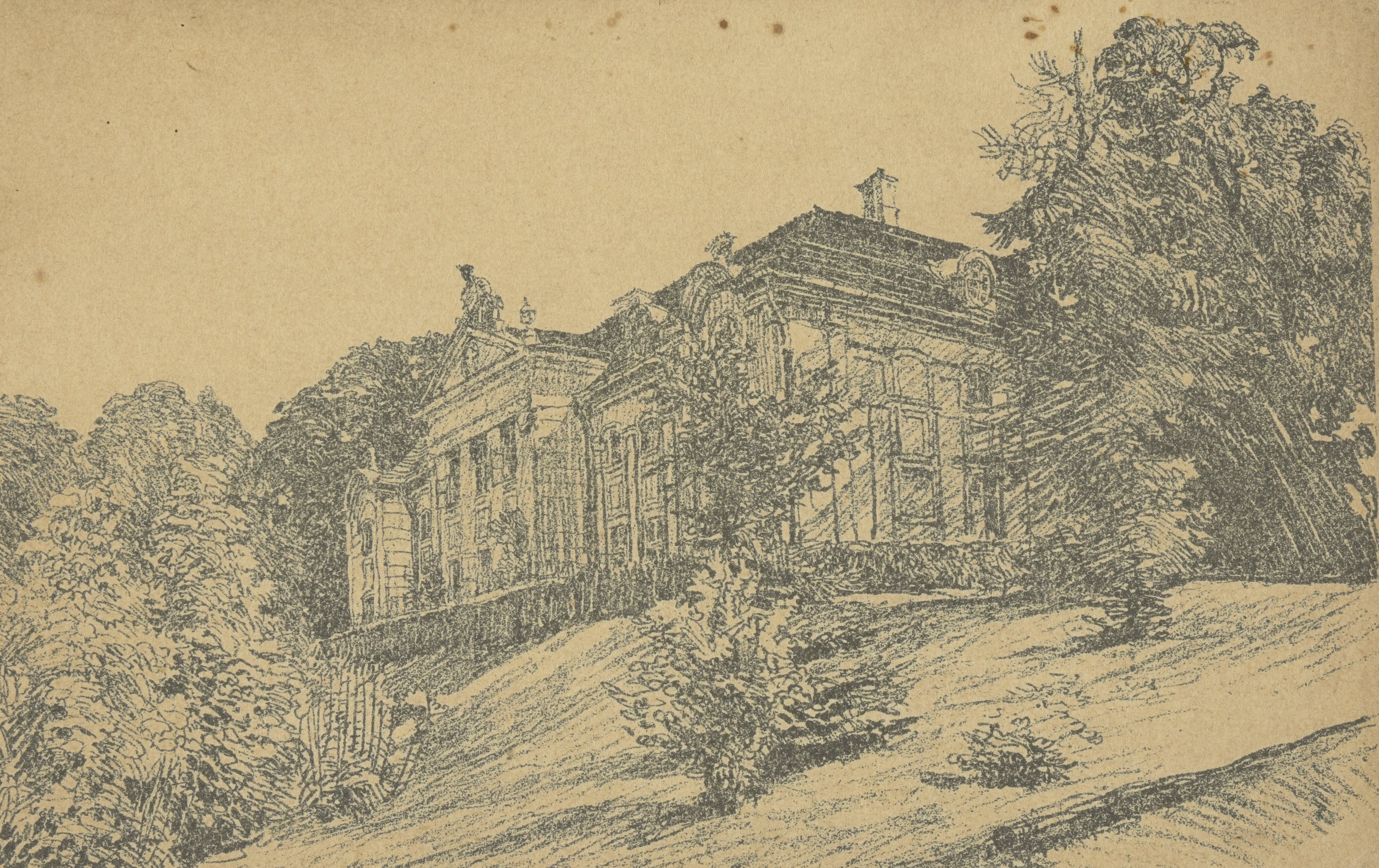
1914
