= Parchocin =

- Village
- Location within Poland
- Coordinates: 50°19′N 20°59′E
- Country: Poland
- Voivodeship: Świętokrzyskie
- County: Busko
- Gmina: Nowy Korczyn
- Population: 410

Parchocin [parˈxɔt͡ɕin] is a village in the administrative district of Gmina Nowy Korczyn, within Busko County, Świętokrzyskie Voivodeship, in south-central Poland. It lies approximately 13 km (8 mi) east of Nowy Korczyn, 26 km (16 mi) south-east of Busko-Zdrój, and 68 km (42 mi) south of the regional capital Kielce.
