= Eugenio Febus =

Puerto Rican boxer

Personal information
- Nationality: Puerto Rican
- Born: 10 April 1949 (age 77) Santurce, Puerto Rico

Sport
- Sport: Boxing

Eugenio Febus (born 10 April 1949) is a Puerto Rican boxer. He competed in the men's lightweight event at the 1968 Summer Olympics. At the 1968 Summer Olympics, he lost to Sayed Abdel Gadir of Sudan.
