= James Dunne (boxer) =

British boxer

Jimmy Dunne
Personal information
- Nationality: British
- Born: 14 May 1941; Liverpool, England
- Died: 3 March 2002 (aged 60); Liverpool, England

Sport
- Sport: Boxing

James Dunne (14 May 1941 – 3 March 2002) was a British boxer. He fought as Jimmy Dunne and competed in the men's lightweight event at the 1964 Summer Olympics. At the 1964 Summer Olympics, he defeated Bienvenido Hita of Cuba, before losing to Rodolfo Arpon of the Philippines.

He won the 1964 Amateur Boxing Association British lightweight title, when boxing out of the Maple Leaf ABC.
