= Rzegocin, Świętokrzyskie Voivodeship =

Rzegocin
- Village
- Location within Poland
- Coordinates: 50°20′48″N 20°50′12″E
- Country: Poland
- Voivodeship: Świętokrzyskie
- County: Busko
- Gmina: Nowy Korczyn
- Population: 137

Rzegocin [ʐɛˈɡɔt͡ɕin] is a village in the administrative district of Gmina Nowy Korczyn, within Busko County, Świętokrzyskie Voivodeship, in south-central Poland. It lies approximately 6 km (4 mi) north of Nowy Korczyn, 16 km (10 mi) south-east of Busko-Zdrój, and 62 km (39 mi) south of the regional capital Kielce.
