= Sępichów =

- Village
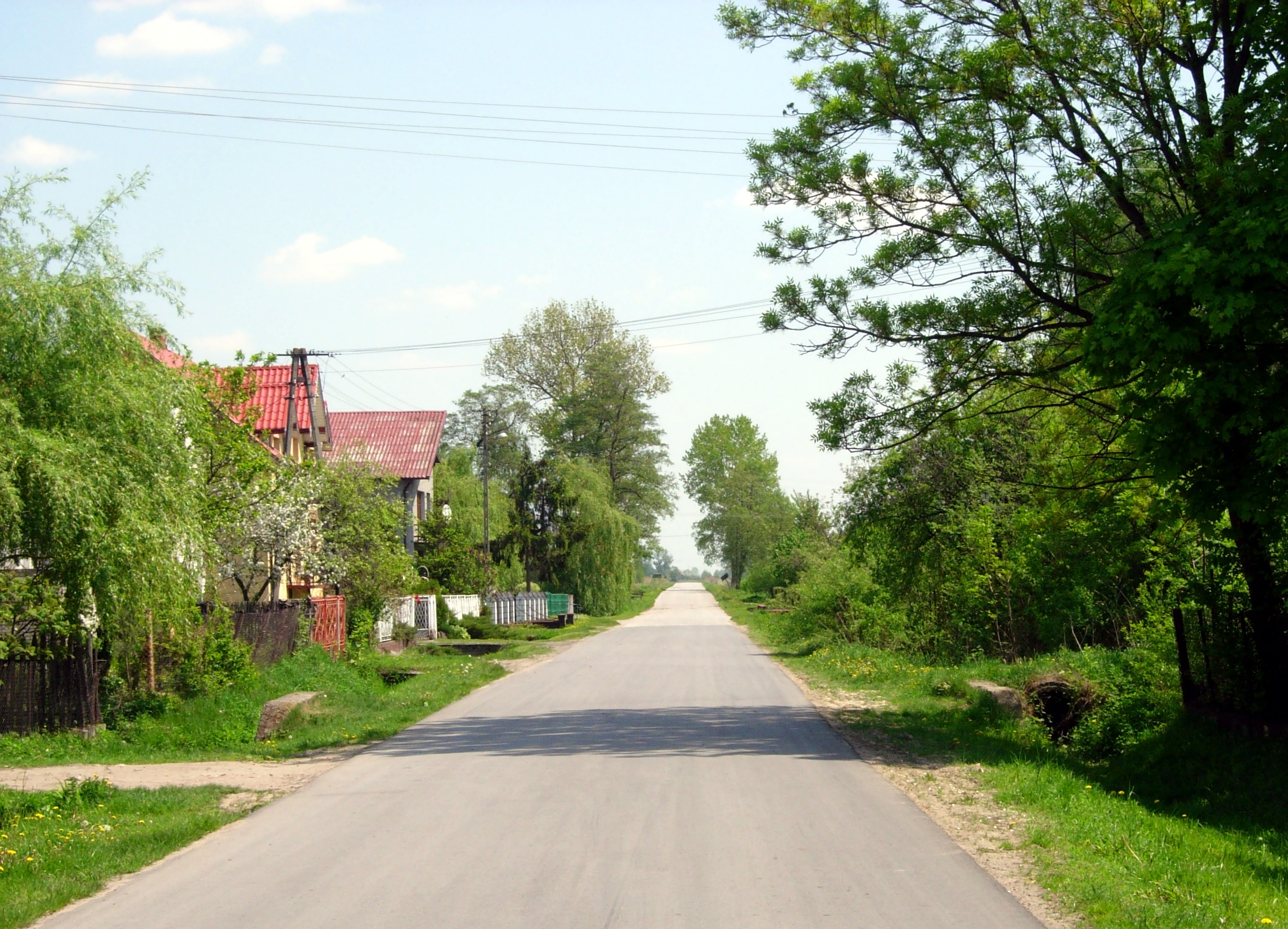

- Location within Poland
- Coordinates: 50°19′N 20°46′E
- Country: Poland
- Voivodeship: Świętokrzyskie
- County: Busko
- Gmina: Nowy Korczyn
- Population: 402

Sępichów [sɛmˈpixuf] is a village in the administrative district of Gmina Nowy Korczyn, within Busko County, Świętokrzyskie Voivodeship, in south-central Poland. It lies approximately 4 km (2 mi) north-west of Nowy Korczyn, 18 km (11 mi) south of Busko-Zdrój, and 64 km (40 mi) south of the regional capital Kielce.
