= Badrzychowice =

- Village
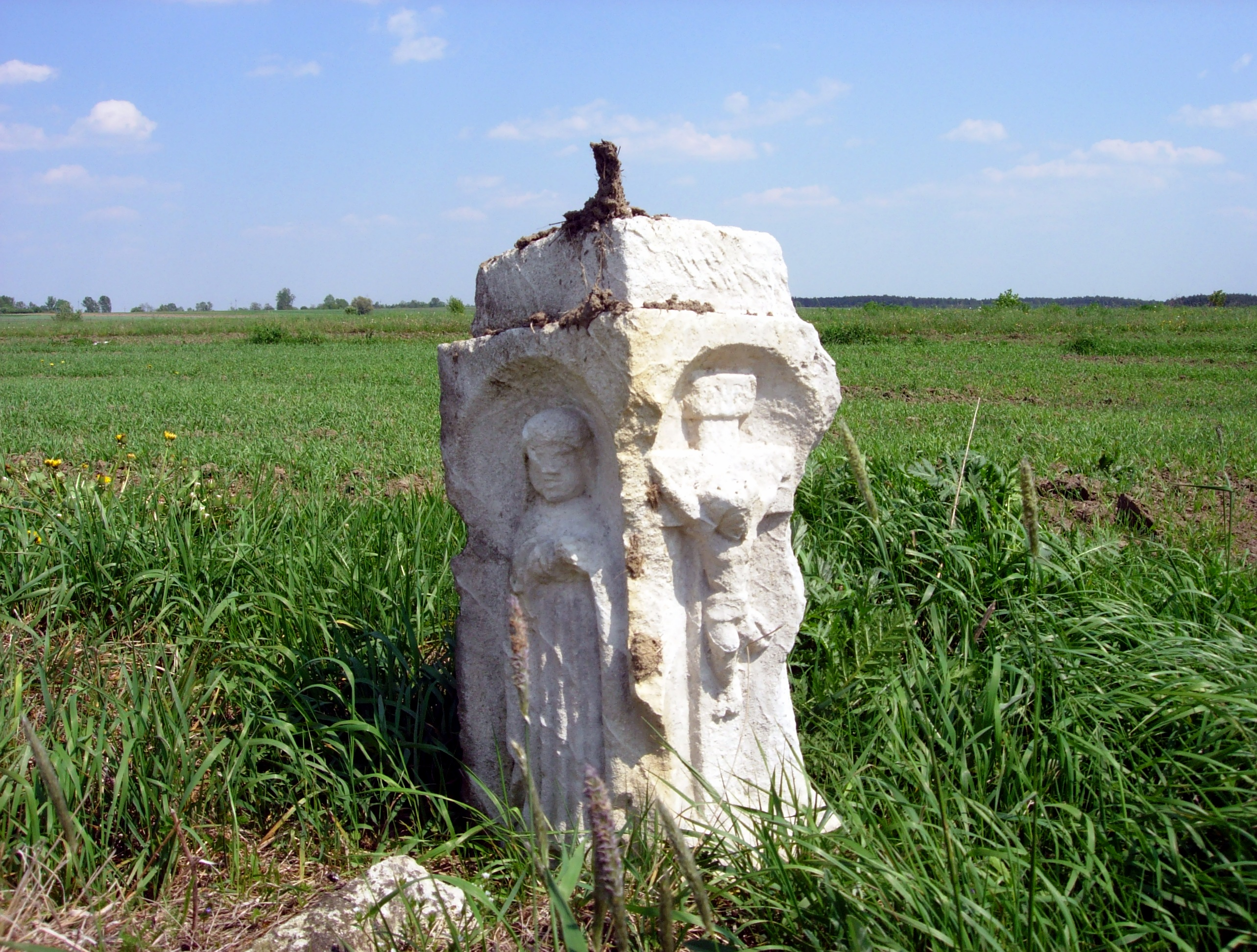

- Location within Poland
- Coordinates: 50°21′N 20°47′E
- Country: Poland
- Voivodeship: Świętokrzyskie
- County: Busko
- Gmina: Nowy Korczyn
- Population: 331

Badrzychowice [badʐɨxɔˈvit͡sɛ] is a village in the administrative district of Gmina Nowy Korczyn, within Busko County, Świętokrzyskie Voivodeship, in south-central Poland. It lies approximately 6 km (4 mi) north of Nowy Korczyn, 14 km (9 mi) south of Busko-Zdrój, and 61 km (38 mi) south of the regional capital Kielce.
