= Ucisków =

- Village
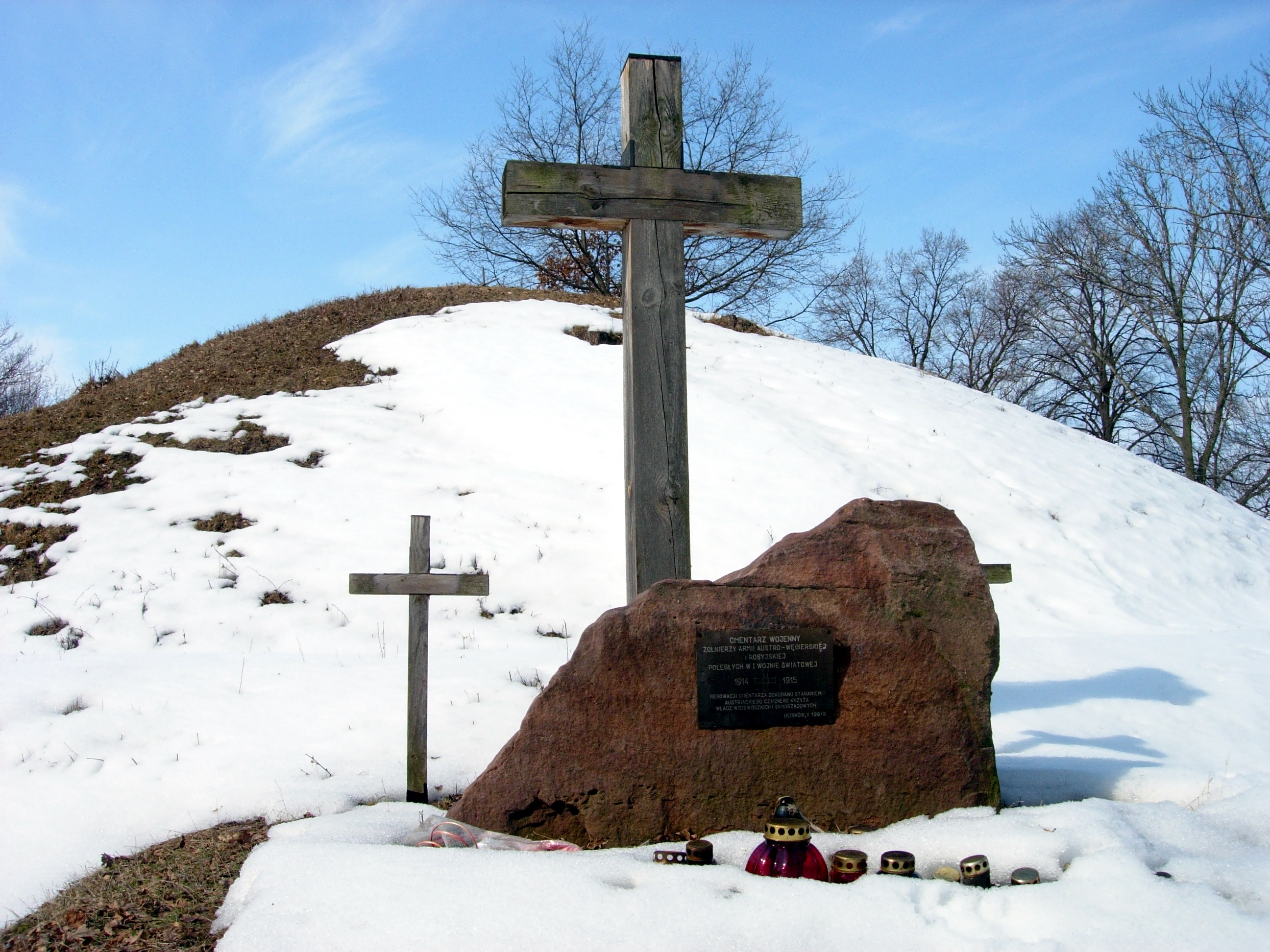
- War cemetery

- Location within Poland
- Coordinates: 50°20′N 20°48′E
- Country: Poland
- Voivodeship: Świętokrzyskie
- County: Busko
- Gmina: Nowy Korczyn
- Population: 108

Ucisków [uˈt͡ɕiskuf] is a village in the administrative district of Gmina Nowy Korczyn, within Busko County, Świętokrzyskie Voivodeship, in south-central Poland. It lies approximately 4 km (2 mi) north of Nowy Korczyn, 16 km (10 mi) south of Busko-Zdrój, and 63 km (39 mi) south of the regional capital Kielce.
