= Mariano Serrano =

Mexican boxer (born 1941)

Personal information
- Nationality: Mexican
- Born: 19 February 1941 (age 84)

Sport
- Sport: Boxing

Mariano Serrano (born 19 February 1941) is a Mexican boxer. He competed in the men's lightweight event at the 1964 Summer Olympics. At the 1964 Summer Olympics, he defeated Abebe Mekonnen of Ethiopia, before losing to Alex Odhiambo of Uganda.
