= Podzamcze, Busko County =

Podzamcze
- Village
- Location within Poland
- Coordinates: 50°17′43″N 20°49′32″E
- Country: Poland
- Voivodeship: Świętokrzyskie
- County: Busko
- Gmina: Nowy Korczyn
- Population: 120

Podzamcze [pɔˈd͡zamt͡ʂɛ] is a village in the administrative district of Gmina Nowy Korczyn, within Busko County, Świętokrzyskie Voivodeship, in south-central Poland. It lies approximately 2 km (1 mi) east of Nowy Korczyn, 21 km (13 mi) south of Busko-Zdrój, and 67 km (42 mi) south of the regional capital Kielce.
