= Strożyska =

- Village
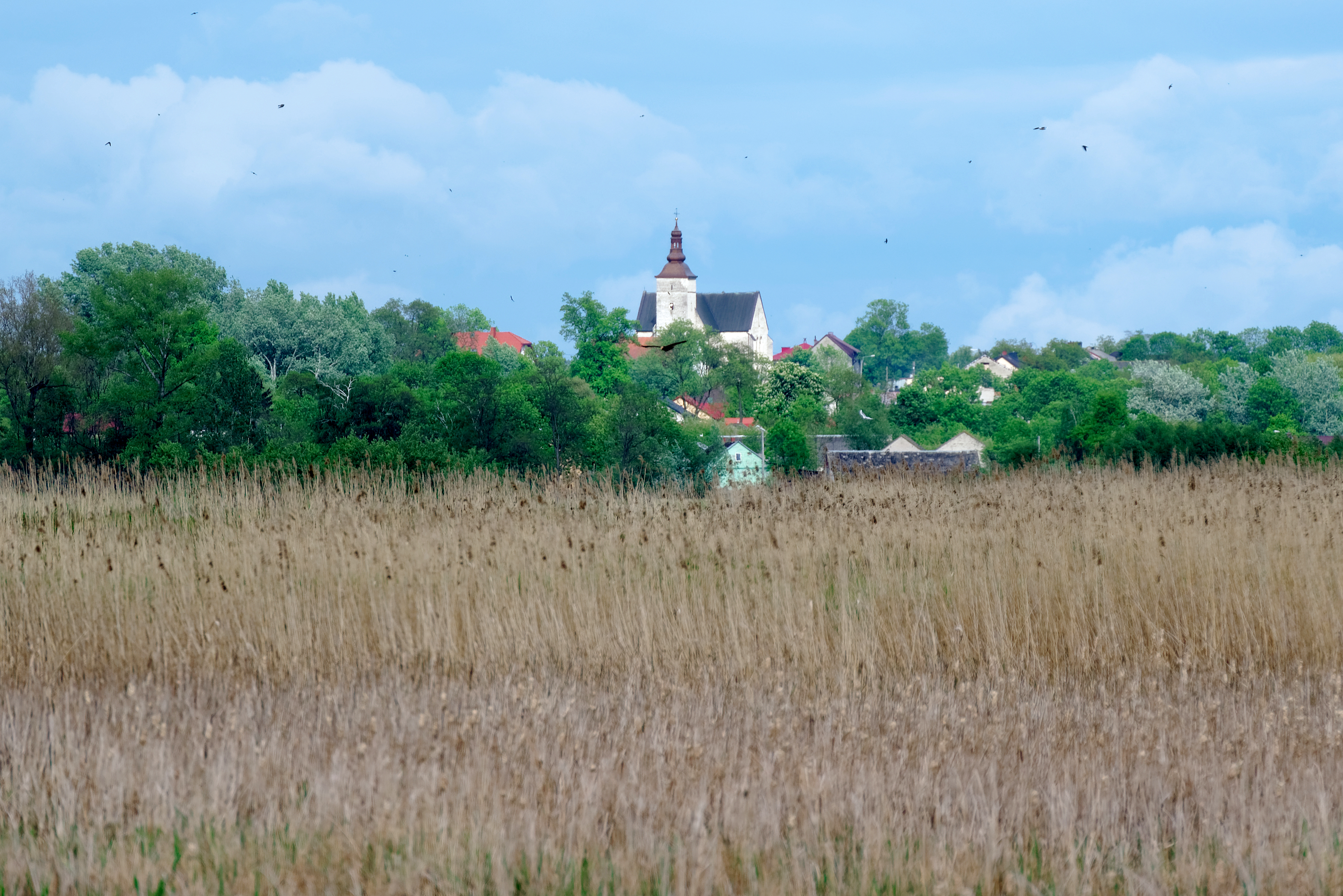

- Location within Poland
- Coordinates: 50°20′N 20°46′E
- Country: Poland
- Voivodeship: Świętokrzyskie
- County: Busko
- Gmina: Nowy Korczyn
- Population: 365

Strożyska [strɔˈʐɨska] is a village situated in the administrative district of Gmina Nowy Korczyn, within Busko County, Świętokrzyskie Voivodeship, in south-central Poland. It lies approximately 5 km (3 mi) north-west of Nowy Korczyn, 16 km (10 mi) south of Busko-Zdrój, and 62 km (39 mi) south of the regional capital Kielce.
