= Peter Rieger =

Peter Rieger can refer to:

- Peter Rieger (boxer) (born 1944), German boxer
- Peter Rieger (long jumper) (born 1953), German athlete
