= Winiary Dolne =

- Village
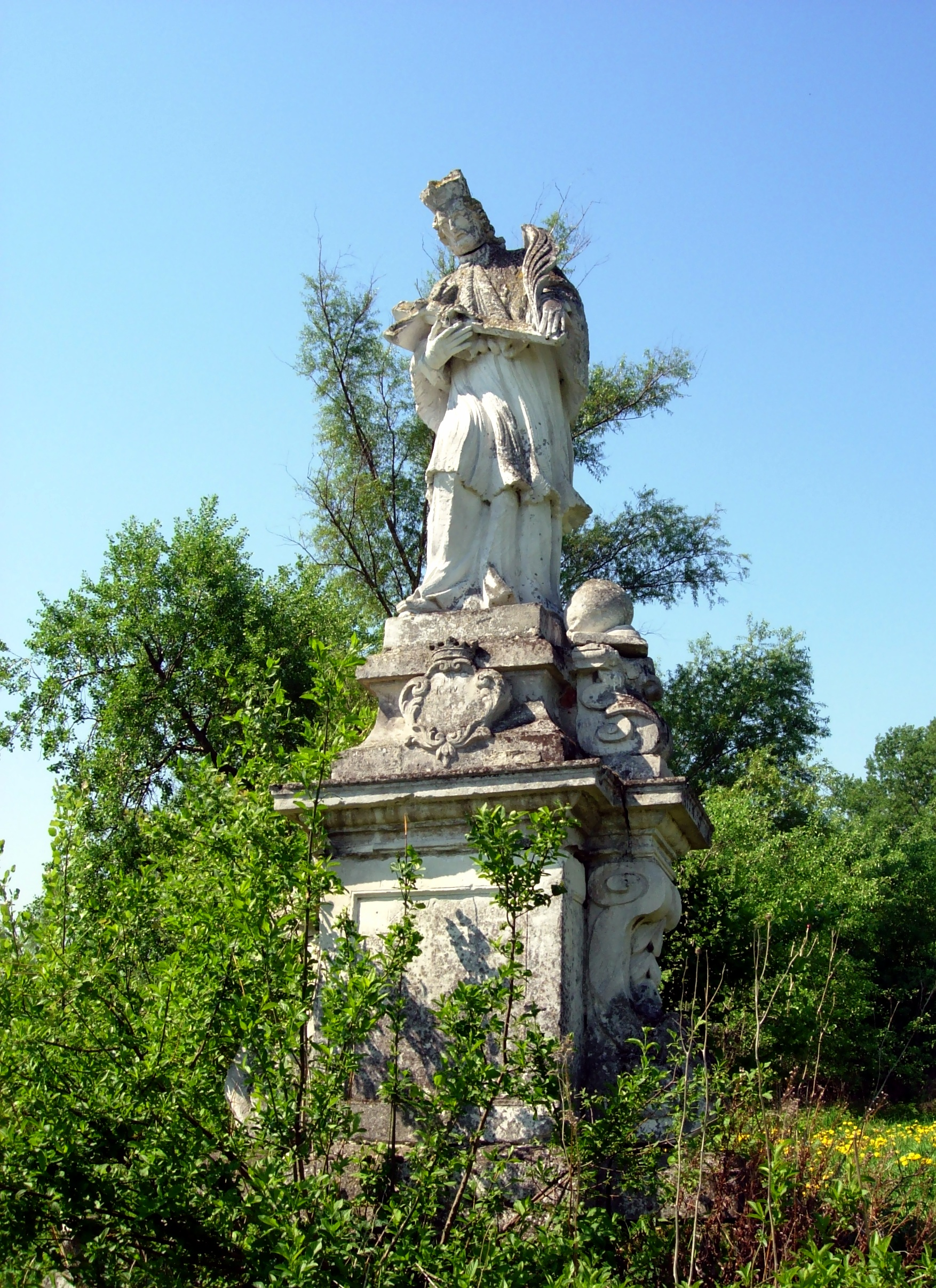

- Location within Poland
- Coordinates: 50°18′N 20°47′E
- Country: Poland
- Voivodeship: Świętokrzyskie
- County: Busko
- Gmina: Nowy Korczyn
- Population: 154
- Website: http://www.winiary.republika.pl/

Winiary Dolne [viˈɲarɨ ˈdɔlnɛ] is a village in the administrative district of Gmina Nowy Korczyn, within Busko County, Świętokrzyskie Voivodeship, in south-central Poland. It lies approximately 2 km (1 mi) west of Nowy Korczyn, 20 km (12 mi) south of Busko-Zdrój, and 66 km (41 mi) south of the regional capital Kielce.
