= Ostrowce =

Ostrowce may refer to the following places in Poland:

- Ostrowce, Masovian Voivodeship (east-central Poland)
- Ostrowce, Świętokrzyskie Voivodeship (south-central Poland)
- Ostrówce, Kuyavian-Pomeranian Voivodeship (north-central Poland)
