= Brzostków =

- Village
- Location within Poland
- Coordinates: 50°18′53″N 20°53′44″E
- Country: Poland
- Voivodeship: Świętokrzyskie
- County: Busko
- Gmina: Nowy Korczyn
- Population: 571

Brzostków [ˈbʐɔstkuf] is a village in the administrative district of Gmina Nowy Korczyn, within Busko County, Świętokrzyskie Voivodeship, in south-central Poland. It lies approximately 7 km (4 mi) east of Nowy Korczyn, 22 km (14 mi) south-east of Busko-Zdrój, and 67 km (42 mi) south of the regional capital Kielce.
