= Żukowice =

Żukowice may refer to the following places in Poland:

- Żukowice, Lower Silesian Voivodeship (south-west Poland)
- Żukowice, Świętokrzyskie Voivodeship (south-central Poland)
- Gmina Żukowice
- Żukowice, Głogów
