= Yeter =

Yeter is a unisex given name and surname of Turkish origin. Notable people with the name include:

== Given name ==
- Yeter Sevimli (1948–1992), Turkish boxer
- Yeter Yalçın (born 1988), Turkish volleyball player

== Surname ==
- Burak Yeter (born 1982), Turkish-Dutch DJ, record producer and remixer
- Ünal Yeter (born 1977), Turkish actor

== Fictional characters ==
- Yeter, character in 2007 Turkish-German film The Edge of Heaven
