= Valery Belousov (boxer) =

Russian boxer

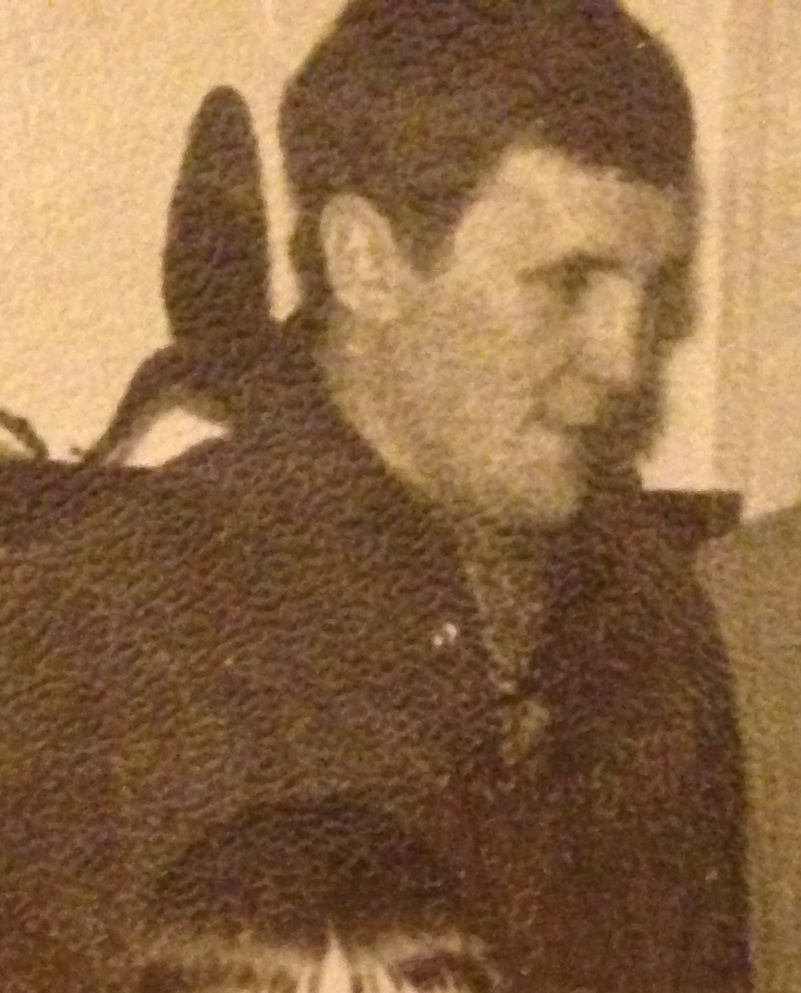

Personal information
- Nationality: Russian
- Born: 4 March 1940 (age 85); Moscow, Russian SFSR, Soviet Union

Sport
- Sport: Boxing

Valery Belousov (born 4 March 1940) is a Russian boxer. He competed in the men's lightweight event at the 1968 Summer Olympics.
