= Seo Bun-nam =

Korean male boxer

Personal information
- Nationality: South Korean
- Born: 5 December 1939 (age 85)

Sport
- Sport: Boxing

Seo Bun-nam (born 5 December 1939) is a South Korean boxer. He competed in the men's lightweight event at the 1964 Summer Olympics.
