= Sammy Amekudji =

Ghanaian boxer

Personal information
- Nationality: Ghanaian
- Born: 25 December 1939 (age 85)

Sport
- Sport: Boxing

Sammy Amekudji (born 25 December 1939) is a Ghanaian boxer. He competed in the men's lightweight event at the 1964 Summer Olympics.
