= Gmina Nowy Korczyn =

Gmina Nowy Korczyn Nowy Korczyn Commune
- Gmina
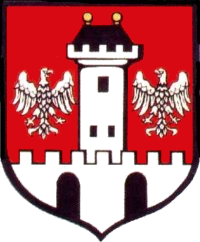
- Coat of arms

- Location within Świętokrzyskie Voivodeship Location within Poland
- Coordinates (Nowy Korczyn): 50°17′57″N 20°48′32″E
- Country: Poland
- Voivodeship: Świętokrzyskie
- County: Busko
- Seat: Nowy Korczyn

Area
  - Total: 117.31 km^{2} (45.29 sq mi)

Population (2006)
  - Total: 6,381
  - Density: 54.39/km^{2} (140.9/sq mi)
- Website: http://nowykorczyn.pl

Gmina Nowy Korczyn is a rural gmina (administrative district) in Busko County, Świętokrzyskie Voivodeship, in south-central Poland. Its seat is the village of Nowy Korczyn, which lies approximately 20 kilometres (12 mi) south of Busko-Zdrój and 67 km (42 mi) south of the regional capital Kielce.

The gmina covers an area of 117.31 square kilometres (45.3 sq mi), and as of 2006 its total population is 6,381.

The gmina contains part of the protected area called Nida Landscape Park.

== Villages ==
Gmina Nowy Korczyn contains the villages and settlements of Badrzychowice, Błotnowola, Brzostków, Czarkowy, Górnowola, Grotniki Duże, Grotniki Małe, Harmoniny, Kawęczyn, Łęka, Nowy Korczyn, Ostrowce, Parchocin, Pawłów, Piasek Wielki, Podraje, Podzamcze, Rzegocin, Sępichów, Stary Korczyn, Strożyska, Ucisków, Winiary Dolne and Żukowice.

== Neighbouring gminas ==
Gmina Nowy Korczyn is bordered by the gminas of Bolesław, Busko-Zdrój, Gręboszów, Mędrzechów, Opatowiec, Pacanów, Solec-Zdrój and Wiślica.
