= Piasek Wielki =

- Village
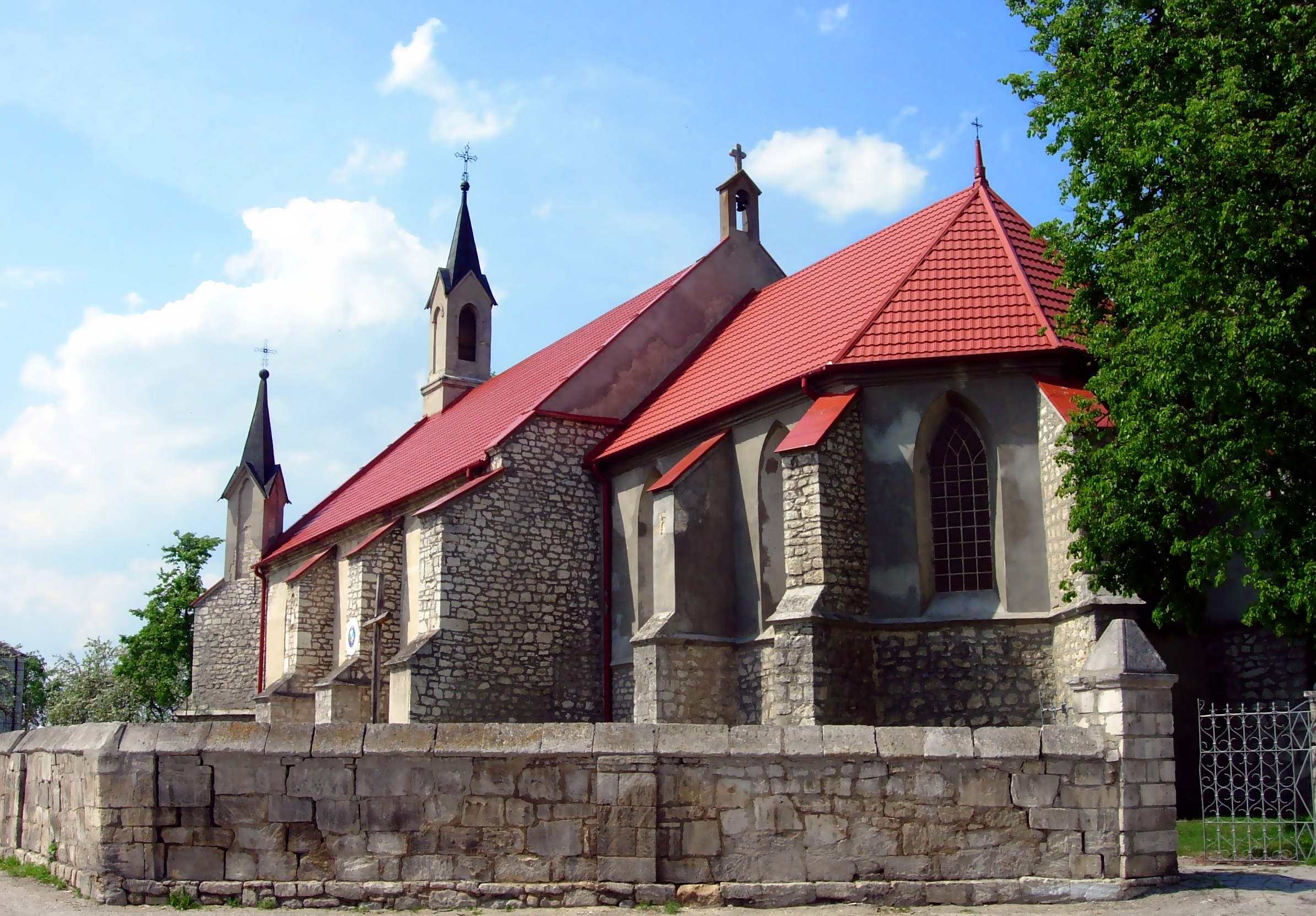
- 14th century St. Catherine of Alexandria church

- Location within Poland
- Coordinates: 50°22′N 20°47′E
- Country: Poland
- Voivodeship: Świętokrzyskie
- County: Busko
- Gmina: Nowy Korczyn
- Population: 508

Piasek Wielki (Polish pronunciation: [ˈpjasɛk ˈfjɛlkʲi]) is a village in the administrative district of Gmina Nowy Korczyn, within Busko County, Świętokrzyskie Voivodeship, in south-central Poland. It lies approximately 8 km (5 mi) north of Nowy Korczyn, 13 km (8 mi) south-east of Busko-Zdrój, and 59 km (37 mi) south of the regional capital Kielce.
