= Pawłów, Busko County =

Village in Gmina Nowy Korczyn, Poland

Pawłów
- Village
- Location within Poland
- Coordinates: 50°18′33″N 20°52′22″E
- Country: Poland
- Voivodeship: Świętokrzyskie
- County: Busko
- Gmina: Nowy Korczyn
- Population: 225

Pawłów [ˈpavwuf] is a village in the administrative district of Gmina Nowy Korczyn, within Busko County, Świętokrzyskie Voivodeship, in south-central Poland.
