= Ramón Puello =

Dominican Republic boxer (born 1946)

Personal information
- Nationality: Dominican
- Born: 25 August 1946 (age 78); Santo Domingo, Dominican Republic

Sport
- Sport: Boxing

Ramón Puello (born 25 August 1946) is a Dominican Republic boxer. He competed in the men's lightweight event at the 1968 Summer Olympics. At the 1968 Summer Olympics, he lost to Armando Mendoza of Venezuela.
