= Lee Chang-gil =

South Korean boxer

Personal information
- Nationality: South Korean
- Born: 21 March 1949; Seoul, South Korea
- Died: 2002 (aged 52–53)

Sport
- Sport: Boxing

Lee Chang-gil (21 March 1949 – 2002) was a South Korean boxer. He competed in the men's lightweight event at the 1968 Summer Olympics. At the 1968 Summer Olympics, he lost to Ronnie Harris of the United States.
