= Smârdan, Tulcea =

Smârdan
- Commune
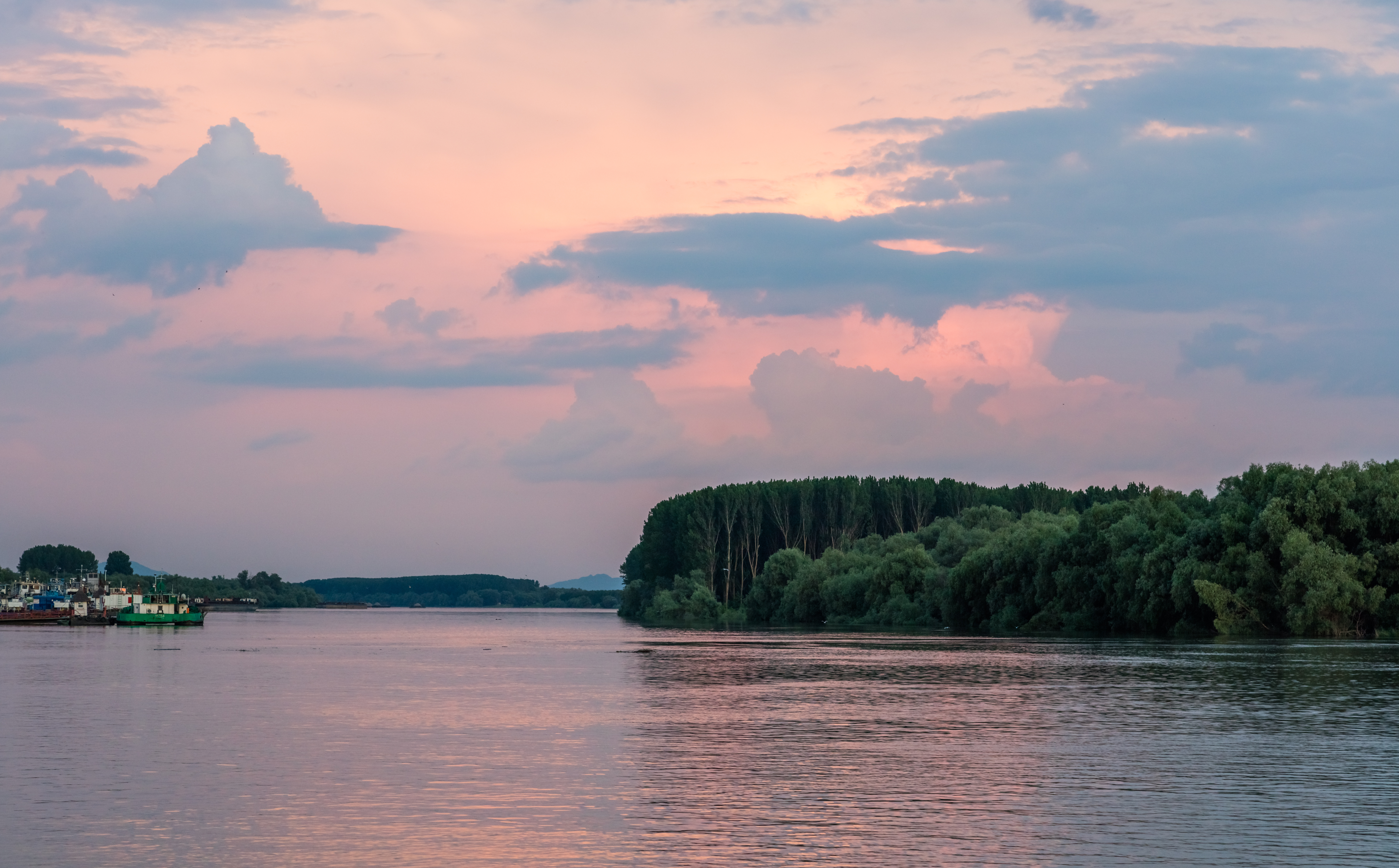
- Danube at Smârdan

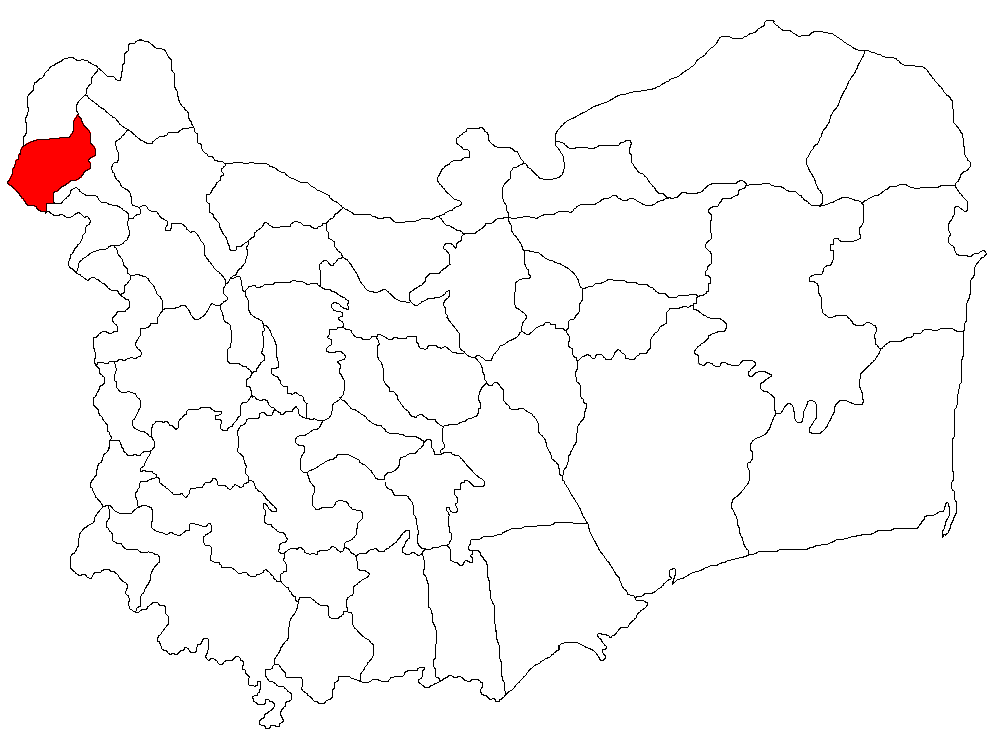
- Location in Tulcea County

- Location in Romania
- Coordinates: 45°17′10″N 28°0′0″E
- Country: Romania
- County: Tulcea

Government
  - Mayor (2020–2024): Vasile Mărculescu (PSD)
- Area: 130.36 km^{2} (50.33 sq mi)
- Elevation: 4 m (13 ft)
- Population (2021-12-01): 960
  - Density: 7.4/km^{2} (19/sq mi)
- Time zone: UTC+02:00 (EET)
  - Summer (DST): UTC+03:00 (EEST)
- Postal code: 827045
- Area code: +(40) 240
- Vehicle reg.: TL
- Website: www.primariasmardantulcea.ro

Smârdan is a commune in Tulcea County, Northern Dobruja, Romania. It is composed of a single village, Smârdan. It is situated on the right bank of the Danube, opposite the city of Brăila.

Historical population
Year	Pop.	±%
2002	1,171	—
2011	1,077	−8.0%
2021	960	−10.9%
Source: Census data

== Natives ==
- Calistrat Cuțov (1948–2025), boxer
- Simion Cuțov (1952–1993), boxer
