= Boxing at the 1967 Pan American Games =

The Men's Boxing Tournament at the 1967 Pan American Games was held in Winnipeg, Manitoba, Canada, from July 24 to August 6.

== Medal winners ==
Event	Gold	Silver	Bronze
Flyweight (– 51 kilograms)	Francisco Rodríguez; Venezuela	Ricardo Delgado; Mexico	Walter Henry; Canada Harlan Marbley; United States
Bantamweight (– 54 kilograms)	Juvencio Martínez; Mexico	Fermin Espinosa; Cuba	Guillermo Velazquez; Chile Armando Mendoza; Venezuela
Featherweight (– 57 kilograms)	Miguel García; Argentina	Francisco Oduardo; Cuba	Freiton Caban; Puerto Rico Albert Robinson; United States
Lightweight (– 60 kilograms)	Enrique Regüeiferos; Cuba	Luis Minami; Peru	Ronnie Harris; United States Juan Rivero; Uruguay
Light Welterweight (– 63.5 kilograms)	Jim Wallington; United States	Hugo Sclarandi; Argentina	Alfredo Morales; Mexico Guillermo Salcedo; Venezuela
Welterweight (– 67 kilograms)	Andres Molina; Cuba	Mario Guilloti; Argentina	Alfonso Ramírez; Mexico Jesse Valdez; United States
Light Middleweight (– 71 kilograms)	Rolando Garbey; Cuba	Víctor Galíndez; Argentina	Agustín Zaragoza; Mexico Donato Paduano; Canada
Middleweight (– 75 kilograms)	Jorge Ahumada; Argentina	Luiz Fabre; Brazil	Joaquin Delis; Cuba Carlos Franco; Uruguay
Light Heavyweight (– 81 kilograms)	Arthur Redden; United States	Juan José Torres; Argentina	Manuel Castanon; Mexico Marijan Kholar; Canada
Heavyweight (+ 81 kilograms)	Forrest Ward; United States	José Cabrera; Cuba	Ricardo Aguad; Argentina

== Medal table ==
Rank	Nation	Gold	Silver	Bronze	Total
1	Cuba (CUB)	3	3	1	7
2	United States (USA)	3	0	4	7
3	Argentina (ARG)	2	4	1	7
4	Mexico (MEX)	1	1	4	6
5	Venezuela (VEN)	1	0	2	3
6	Brazil (BRA)	0	1	0	1
6	Peru (PER)	0	1	0	1
8	Canada (CAN)	0	0	3	3
9	Uruguay (URU)	0	0	2	2
10	Chile (CHI)	0	0	1	1
10	Puerto Rico (PUR)	0	0	1	1
Totals (11 entries)		10	10	19	39
