= Wang Chee-chu =

Taiwanese boxer

Personal information
- Full name: 王 基濋, Pinyin: Wáng Jī-chǔ
- Nationality: Taiwanese
- Born: 3 May 1941 (age 83)

Sport
- Sport: Boxing

Wang Chee-chu (born 3 May 1941) is a Taiwanese boxer. He competed in the men's lightweight event at the 1964 Summer Olympics.
