= Fawzi Hassan =

Egyptian boxer (born 1939)

Personal information
- Nationality: Egyptian
- Born: 23 January 1939 (age 86)

Sport
- Sport: Boxing

Fawzi Hassan (born 23 January 1939) is an Egyptian boxer. He competed in the men's lightweight event at the 1964 Summer Olympics. At the 1964 Summer Olympics, he lost to Ronald Allen Harris of the United States.
