= Ostrowce, Świętokrzyskie Voivodeship =

Ostrowce
- Village
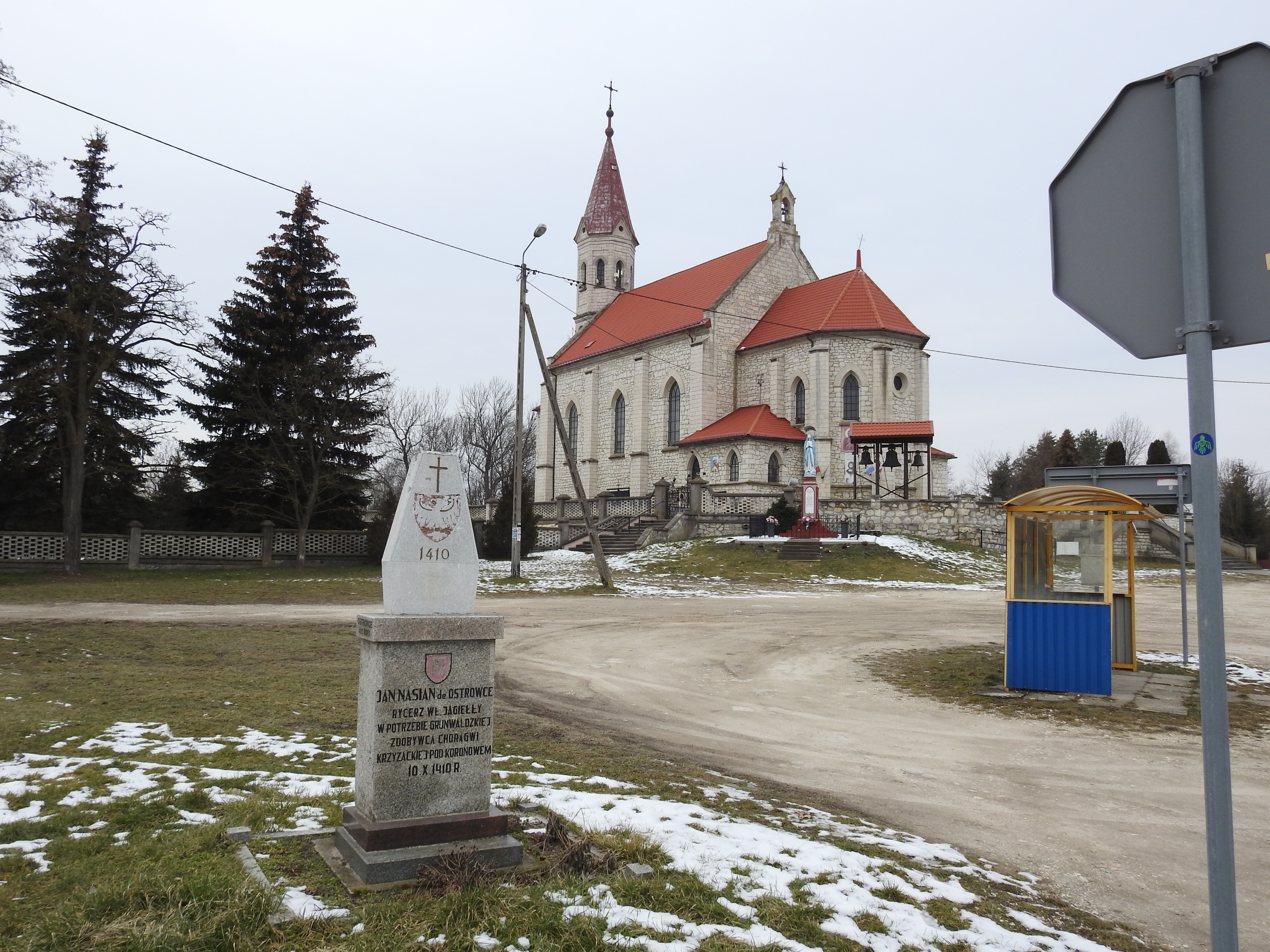

- Location within Poland
- Coordinates: 50°20′9″N 20°51′46″E
- Country: Poland
- Voivodeship: Świętokrzyskie
- County: Busko
- Gmina: Nowy Korczyn
- Population: 164

Ostrowce [ɔsˈtrɔft͡sɛ] is a village in the administrative district of Gmina Nowy Korczyn, within Busko County, Świętokrzyskie Voivodeship, in south-central Poland. It lies approximately 6 km (4 mi) north-east of Nowy Korczyn, 18 km (11 mi) south-east of Busko-Zdrój, and 64 km (40 mi) south of the regional capital Kielce.
