= Erik Nikkinen =

Finnish boxer

Personal information
- Nationality: Finnish
- Born: 10 February 1944 (age 81); Oulu, Finland

Sport
- Sport: Boxing

Erik Nikkinen (born 10 February 1944) is a Finnish boxer. He competed in the men's lightweight event at the 1968 Summer Olympics. At the 1968 Summer Olympics, he lost to Calistrat Cuțov of Romania.
