= Bayu Ayele =

Ethiopian boxer (born 1949)

Personal information
- Nationality: Ethiopian
- Born: 4 April 1949 (age 75); Addis Ababa, Ethiopia

Sport
- Sport: Boxing

Bayu Ayele (born 4 April 1949) is an Ethiopian boxer. He competed in the men's lightweight event at the 1968 Summer Olympics. In his opening fight at the 1968 Summer Olympics, he lost to Stoiane Pilitchev of Bulgaria.
