= Wolfgang Schmitt =

German boxer

Personal information
- Nationality: German
- Born: 26 February 1939; Mainz, Germany
- Died: 13 July 2017 (aged 78); Alzey, Germany

Sport
- Sport: Boxing

Wolfgang Schmitt (26 February 1939 – 13 July 2017) was a German boxer. He competed in the men's lightweight event at the 1964 Summer Olympics.
