= Żukowice, Świętokrzyskie Voivodeship =

Żukowice
- Village
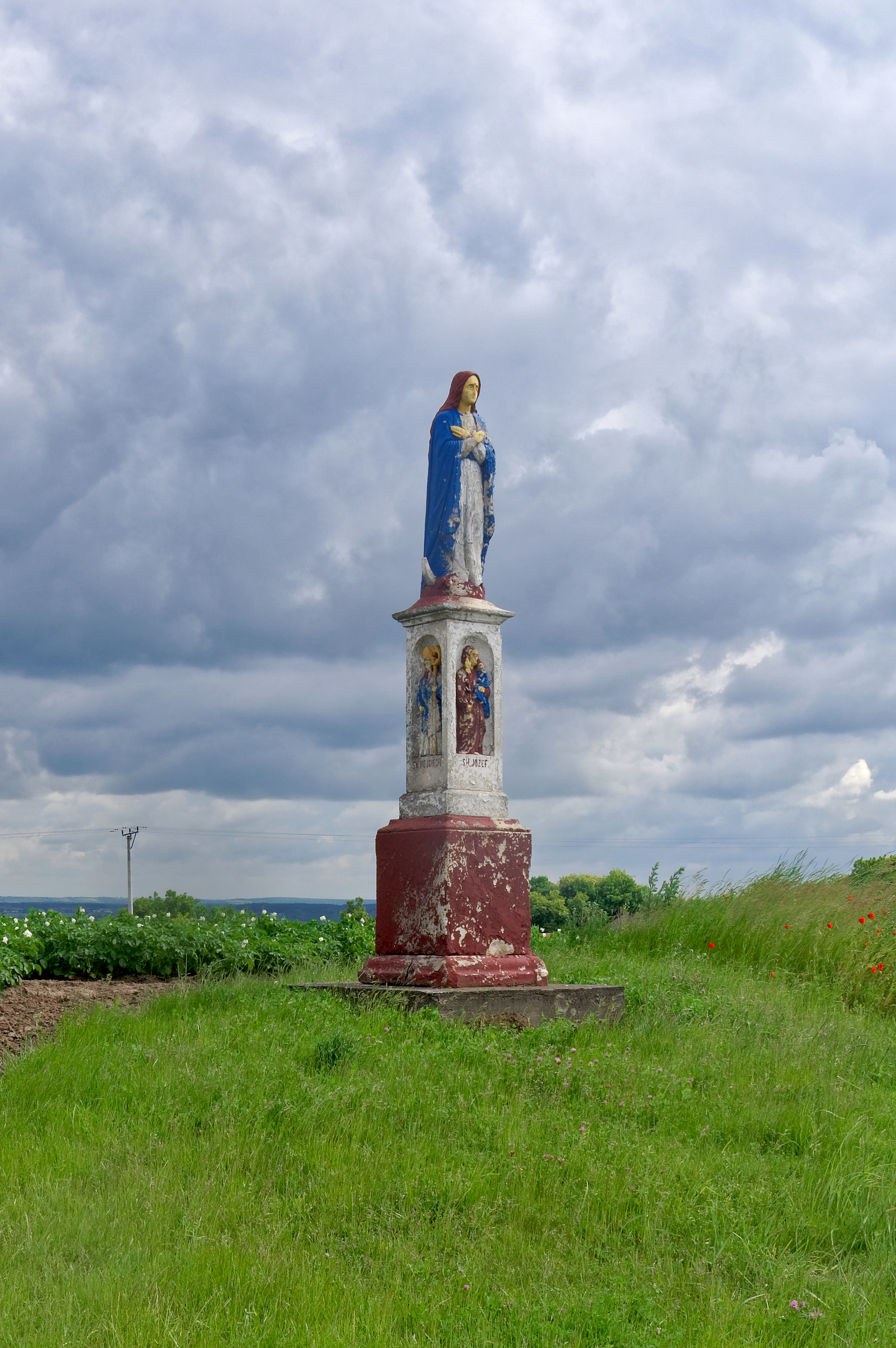

- Location within Poland
- Coordinates: 50°17′48″N 20°43′58″E
- Country: Poland
- Voivodeship: Świętokrzyskie
- County: Busko
- Gmina: Nowy Korczyn
- Population: 81
- Post code: 28-136
- Vehicle registration: TBU

Żukowice [ʐukɔˈvit͡sɛ] is a village in the administrative district of Gmina Nowy Korczyn, within Busko County, Świętokrzyskie Voivodeship, in south-central Poland. It lies approximately 6 km (4 mi) west of Nowy Korczyn, 19 km (12 mi) south of Busko-Zdrój, and 66 km (41 mi) south of the regional capital Kielce.

In 1975–1998 the village was under the administration of the Kielce Voivodeship.
