= Inoua Bodia =

Cameroonian boxer (born 1947)

Personal information
- Nationality: Cameroonian
- Born: 4 December 1947 (age 77); Bafia, Cameroon

Sport
- Sport: Boxing

Inoua Bodia (born 4 December 1947) is a Cameroonian boxer. He competed in the men's lightweight event at the 1968 Summer Olympics. At the 1968 Summer Olympics, he lost to Anthony Quinn of Ireland.
