= Nida (river) =

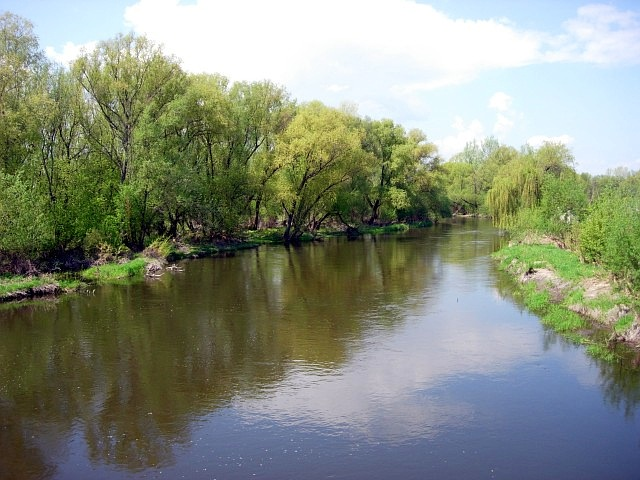
- Nida River near Wiślica Nida on the map of Poland

Location
- Country: Poland

Physical characteristics
- Mouth
  - location: Vistula
  - coordinates: 50°17′48″N 20°51′17″E
- Length: 154 km (96 mi)
- Basin size: 3,844 km^{2} (1,484 sq mi)
- Discharge
  - average: 21.1 m^{3}/s (750 cu ft/s)

Basin features
- Progression: Vistula→ Baltic Sea

The Nida pronounced [ˈɲida] is a river in central Poland, a left tributary of the Vistula river, into which it flows near Nowy Korczyn). The Nida has a length of 154 kilometres and a basin area of 3,844 km^{2}. This includes the protected area called Nida Landscape Park.

The Nida itself is made up of two smaller rivers, the White Nida and the Black Nida, which merge in the village of Brzegi (near Checiny). It is a typical lowland river, with little difference in the water level. The valley of the Nida is wide, and covered with meadows. At its narrowest, the river is only 6 m wide, while at its widest spot, the Nida is 79 m across. The depth ranges from 0,4 to 2,6 m. The Nida is one of the warmest rivers of Poland; in the summer, its temperature reaches up to 27 degrees C.

== Nida River Valley ==
The Nida Valley is a geographic region in southern Poland, along the lower and middle Nida. It is 65 kilometres long and 2 - 6 kilometres wide. The bottom of the valley is flat and wet, with peat appearing in several locations in the former oxbow lakes. The valley is marked by numerous meadows and pastures, and its main urban centers are ancient Lesser Poland towns of Pinczow, Wislica and Nowy Korczyn.

== Ponidzie ==
The name Ponidzie refers to a region of Lesser Poland, which lies along the Nida, and which is much larger than the valley. It stretches from Checiny to Nowy Korczyn, with three landscape parks: Nida Landscape Park, Szaniec Landscape Park and Kozubow Landscape Park. Furthermore, there are several nature reserves, such as Przeslin, Skorocice, Krzyzanowice, Skotniki Gorne, Winiary Zagojskie, Gory Wschodnie, Grabowiec and Skowronno. In the north, the region is marked by gypsum rocks, while in the south the landscape is flat. The region has two symbols, the Adonis vernalis, and the Gothic collegiate church in Wiślica.

Ponidzie, which lies halfway between the historic centers of Lesser Poland, Kraków and Sandomierz, was, in the late Middle Ages, one of the most important regions of the Kingdom of Poland. Divided between Kraków Voivodeship and Sandomierz Voivodeship, it had several castles, and many significant events took place here, in the once-important local towns of Chęciny, Nowy Korczyn, Pińczów, Wiślica, Jędrzejów, Pacanów, Szydłów, Opatowiec, Chmielnik, and Stopnica. Destroyed and ransacked during the Swedish invasion of Poland, the region has never regained its greatness.

In the 16th century, Ponidzie was one of Lesser Poland’s centres of Protestant Reformation, here Polish Brethren prayer houses and schools operated, with the most famous, the Racovian Academy. Among Protestant activists who worked here are such names, as Jan Łaski, Samuel Przypkowski, and Marcin Ruar. Furthermore, Jan Chryzostom Pasek lived here for many years. Wojciech Belon dedicated one of his songs to Ponidzie, and one of the most popular tourist attractions of the region is a narrow gauge railway “Ciuchcia Express Ponidzie”.

== Towns and townships along the Nida ==
- Sobków
- Pińczów
- Wiślica
- Nowy Korczyn

== See also ==
- Rivers of Poland
