= Luis Minami =

Peruvian boxer

Personal information
- Full name: Luis Toshiyuki Minami Minami
- Born: 13 February 1943 (age 83) Chincha Alta, Peru
- Height: 166 cm (5 ft 5 in)
- Weight: 60 kg (132 lb)

Sport
- Sport: Boxing
- Weight class: Lightweight
Medal record
Men's boxing
Representing Peru
Bolivarian Games
Gold medal – first place	1965 Quito	Lightweight -60 kg
Pan American Games
Silver medal – second place	1967 Winnipeg	Lightweight -60 kg

Luis Toshiyuki Minami Minami (Note: In this Spanish name, the first or paternal surname is Minami and the second or maternal family name is Minami.) (born 13 February 1943) is a Peruvian boxer. He competed in the men's lightweight event at the 1968 Summer Olympics.
