= Pedro Agüero =

Argentine boxer (born 1948)

Pedro Luciano Agüero
Personal information
- Born: 13 December 1948 (age 77) Mendoza, Argentina
- Height: 1.65 m (5 ft 5 in)
- Weight: 60 kg (130 lb)

Sport
- Sport: Boxing

Pedro Luciano Agüero Ceballos (born 13 December 1948) is an Argentine boxer. He competed in the 1968 Summer Olympics.
