= Yeter Sevimli =

Turkish boxer (1948–1992)

Personal information
- Nationality: Turkish
- Born: 1 December 1948; Hopa, Turkey
- Died: 11 December 1992 (aged 44); Istanbul, Turkey

Sport
- Sport: Boxing

Yeter Sevimli (1 December 1948 — 12 November 1992) was a Turkish boxer. He competed in the men's lightweight event at the 1968 Summer Olympics. He was killed by 7 robbers with guns in Istanbul in 12 November 1992.
