= Bienvenido Hita =

Cuban boxer

Personal information
- Nationality: Cuban
- Born: 2 November 1944 (age 80)

Sport
- Sport: Boxing

Bienvenido Hita (born 2 November 1944) is a Cuban boxer. He competed in the men's lightweight event at the 1964 Summer Olympics.
