= Luis Muñoz (boxer) =

Chilean boxer

Personal information
- Born: 19 March 1947 (age 78) Santiago, Chile

Sport
- Sport: Boxing

Luis Muñoz (born 19 March 1947) is a Chilean boxer. He competed in the men's lightweight event at the 1968 Summer Olympics.
