= Anthony Quinn (boxer) =

Irish boxer

Personal information
- Nationality: Irish
- Born: 30 November 1949 (age 75); Newry, Northern Ireland

Sport
- Sport: Boxing

Anthony Quinn (born 30 November 1949) is an Irish boxer. He competed in the men's lightweight event at the 1968 Summer Olympics.
