= Abebe Mekonnen (boxer) =

Ethiopian boxer (born 1940)

Personal information
- Nationality: Ethiopian
- Born: 23 September 1940 (age 84)

Sport
- Sport: Boxing

Abebe Mekonnen (born 23 September 1940) is an Ethiopian boxer. He competed in the men's lightweight event at the 1964 Summer Olympics.
