= Dominique Azzaro =

French boxer

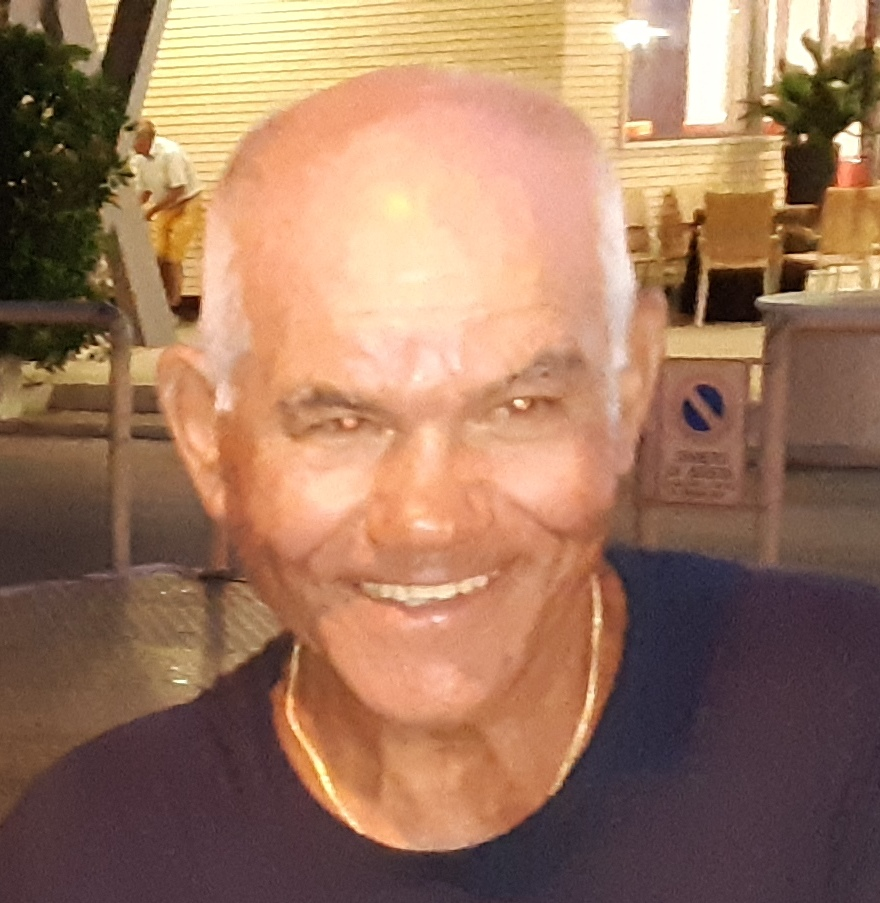
- Azzaro in 2019

Personal information
- Nationality: French
- Born: 11 February 1948 (age 77); Tunis, Tunisia

Sport
- Sport: Boxing

Dominique Azzaro (born 11 February 1948) is a French former boxer. He competed in the men's lightweight event at the 1968 Summer Olympics. At the 1968 Summer Olympics in Mexico City, he received a bye in the Round of 64. In the Round of 32 he lost to José Antonio Duran of Mexico in his first fight.
