= Kanemaru Shiratori =

Japanese boxer

Personal information
- Nationality: Japanese
- Born: 3 February 1942 (age 83)

Sport
- Sport: Boxing

Kanemaru Shiratori (白鳥 金丸, Shiratori Kanemaru; born 3 February 1942) is a Japanese boxer. He competed in the men's lightweight event at the 1964 Summer Olympics.
