= Enzo Petriglia =

Italian boxer (born 1946)

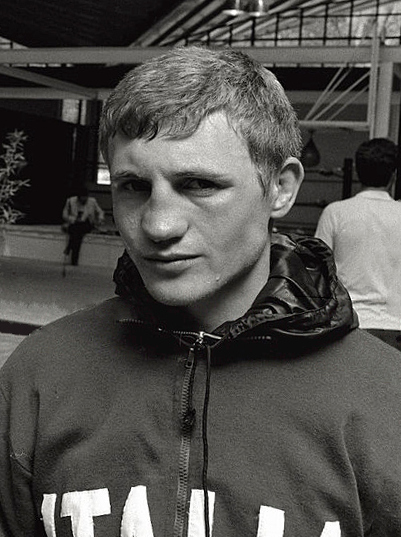
- Enzo Petriglia at the 1968 Olympics

Personal information
- Nationality: Italy
- Born: 23 September 1946 (age 79) Velletri, Roma, Italy
- Height: 1.66 m (5 ft 5 in)
- Weight: Lightweight

Boxing career

Boxing record
- Total fights: 31
- Wins: 23
- Win by KO: 14
- Losses: 5
- Draws: 3
Medal record
Representing Italy
Mediterranean Games
Bronze medal – third place	1967 Tunis	-60 kg

Enzo Petriglia (born 23 September 1946) is a retired Italian lightweight boxer who won a bronze medal at the 1967 Mediterranean Games. Next year he competed at the Mexico Olympics, but was eliminated in the fourth round by the eventual silver medalist Józef Grudzień. After the Olympics he turned professional, and won a national title in 1971. He unsuccessfully contested the European (EBU) lightweight title in 1972, and retired in 1974.
