= Marvin Arneson =

Canadian boxer (born 1943)

Personal information
- Born: 7 July 1943 (age 82) Canada

Sport
- Sport: Boxing
Medal record
Men's amateur boxing
Representing Canada
North American Championships
Gold medal – first place	1970 Vancouver	Lightweight

Marvin Arneson (born 7 July 1943) is a Canadian boxer. He competed in the men's lightweight event at the 1968 Summer Olympics. At the 1968 Summer Olympics, he lost to John Stracey of Great Britain.
