= Ho Su-lung =

Taiwanese boxer

Personal information
- Full name: 何 四郎, Pinyin: Hé Sì-láng
- Nationality: Taiwanese
- Born: 9 September 1940 (age 84); Taipei, Taiwan

Sport
- Sport: Boxing

Ho Su-lung (born 9 September 1940) is a Taiwanese boxer. He competed in the men's lightweight event at the 1968 Summer Olympics.
