= Juan Rivero =

Uruguayan boxer (born 1940)

Personal information
- Full name: Juan Carlos Rivero
- Born: 22 November 1940 (age 85) Montevideo, Uruguay
- Height: 170 cm (5 ft 7 in)
- Weight: 60 kg (132 lb)

Sport
- Sport: Boxing
- Weight class: Lightweight
Medal record
Men's boxing
Representing Uruguay
Pan American Games
| Bronze medal – third place | 1967 Winnipeg | Lightweight -60 kg |

Juan Carlos Rivero (born 22 November 1940) is a Uruguayan boxer. He competed in the men's lightweight event at the 1968 Summer Olympics.
