= Armando Mendoza =

Venezuelan boxer (born 1948)

Personal information
- Born: 26 April 1948 (age 78) Maracay, Venezuela
- Height: 173 cm (5 ft 8 in)
- Weight: 60 kg (132 lb)

Sport
- Sport: Boxing
- Weight class: Bantamweight, Lightweight
Medal record
Men's boxing
Representing Venezuela
Pan American Games
Bronze medal – third place	1967 Winnipeg	Bantamweight -54 kg

Armando Mendoza (born 26 April 1948) is a Venezuelan boxer. He competed in the men's lightweight event at the 1968 Summer Olympics.
