= László Gula =

Hungarian boxer

Personal information
- Nationality: Hungarian
- Born: 7 May 1944 (age 81) Budapest, Hungary

Sport
- Sport: Boxing

László Gula (born 7 May 1944) is a Hungarian boxer. He competed in the men's lightweight event at the 1968 Summer Olympics.
