= Peter Rieger (boxer) =

German boxer

Personal information
- Nationality: German
- Born: 5 January 1944 (age 82) Neisse, Upper Silesia, Germany

Sport
- Sport: Boxing

Peter Rieger (born 5 January 1944) is a German boxer. He competed in the men's lightweight event at the 1968 Summer Olympics.
