= Ronnie Harris (American boxer, born 1948) =

American boxer (born 1948)

Personal information
- Full name: Ronald Woodson Harris
- Nickname: Mazel
- Born: September 3, 1948 (age 77) Canton, Ohio, U.S.
- Height: 5 ft 10 in (1.78 m)
- Weight: 132 lb (60 kg)

Sport
- Sport: Boxing
- Weight class: Lightweight
Medal record
Men's boxing
Representing the United States
Olympic Games
| Gold medal – first place | 1968 Mexico City | Lightweight -60 kg |
Pan American Games
| Bronze medal – third place | 1967 Winnipeg | Lightweight -60 kg |

Ronald Woodson Harris (born September 3, 1948), nicknamed "Mazel", is an American former boxer, who won a gold medal in the lightweight division at the 1968 Summer Olympics.

== Personal ==
Harris was born in Canton, Ohio.

== Amateur career ==
Harris won the 1966, 1967, and 1968 National AAU lightweight championship and was the 1968 Olympic gold medalist at 132 pounds.

== 1968 Olympic results ==
Below are the results of Ronnie Harris who competed for the United States as a lightweight boxer at the 1968 Olympics in Mexico City:

- Round of 64: bye
- Round of 32: defeated Lee Chang-kyi (South Korea) on points, 5-0
- Round of 16: defeated John Stracey (Great Britain) on points, 4-1
- Quarterfinal: defeated Mohamed Muruli (Uganda) on points, 5-0
- Semifinal: defeated Calistrat Cutov (Romania) on points, 5-0
- Final: defeated Josef Grudzein (Poland) on points, 5-0 (won gold medal)

== Professional career ==
Harris turned professional in 1971 and was undefeated until 1978. In 1978 he took on WBC and WBA middleweight title holder Hugo Pastor Corro for the then undisputed world Middleweight title, but lost a decision. A notably win in his career was when Harris defeated future middleweight world champion Alan Minter. He retired in 1982.

He opened his own boxing school in 1981 in New York City on West 32nd street. One of his first students was Warren J. Miller, a twice Navy Seal/DEA Agent. He trained Warren Miller to win the Ohio State Golden Gloves in 1981.
