= Rodolfo Arpon =

Filipino boxer

Personal information
- Nationality: Filipino
- Born: April 10, 1944 (age 81) Leyte, Philippines
- Height: 5 ft 6 in (167 cm)
- Weight: 130 lb (60 kg)

Sport
- Sport: Boxing

Rodolfo Arpon (born April 10, 1944) is a Filipino boxer. He competed at the 1964 Summer Olympics and the 1968 Summer Olympics. At the 1964 Summer Olympics, he defeated Børge Krogh and James Dunne, before losing to Ronald Harris.
