= Mongi Landhili =

Tunisian boxer (born 1945)

Mongi Lahdhili
Personal information
- Nationality: Tunisian
- Born: 15 December 1945 (age 79); Sidi Ahmed, Tunisia

Sport
- Sport: Boxing

Mongi Lahdhili (born 15 December 1945) is a Tunisian boxer. He competed in the men's lightweight event at the 1968 Summer Olympics.
