= Gabriel Achy Assi =

Ivorian boxer (born 1938)

Personal information
- Full name
- Nationality: Ivorian
- Born: 13 November 1938 (age 86)
- Died
- Height: 1.66 m (5 ft 5 in)
- Weight: 61 kg (134 lb)

Sport
- Sport: Boxing

Gabriel Achy Assi (born 13 November 1938) is an Ivorian boxer. He competed in the 1964 Summer Olympics.

== 1964 Olympic results ==
Below is the record of Gabriel Achy Assi, a lightweight boxer from the Ivory Coast who competed at the 1964 Tokyo Olympics:

- Round of 64: bye
- Round of 32: lost to Campbell Palmer (Canada) by decision, 2-3
