= Jonathan Dele =

Nigerian boxer

Personal information
- Nationality: Nigerian
- Born: 20 October 1944 Lagos, Nigeria
- Died: 29 April 2017 (aged 70)
- Weight: super feather/light/light welterweight

Boxing career

Boxing record
- Total fights: 58
- Wins: 40 (KO 24)
- Losses: 10 (KO 4)
- Draws: 8

Jonathan Dele (20 October 1944 – 29 April 2017) was a Nigerian professional super feather/light/light welterweight boxer of the 1960s and 1970s who won Commonwealth lightweight title, his professional fighting weight varied from 129 3/4 lb (58.9 kg; 9 st 3.8 lb), i.e. super featherweight to 136 3/4 lb (62.0 kg; 9 st 10.8 lb), i.e. light welterweight. He also competed in the men's lightweight event at the 1968 Summer Olympics.
