= Calistrat Cuțov =

Romanian boxer (1948–2025)

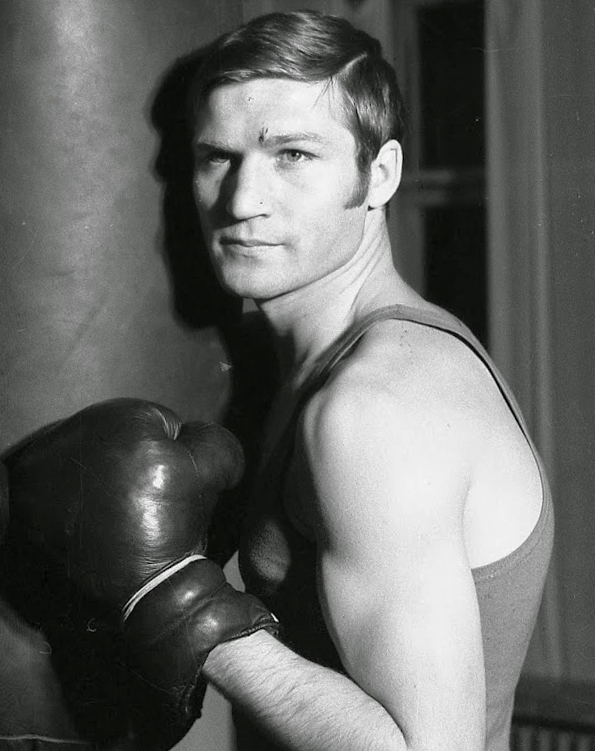
- Cuțov in the 1970s

Personal information
- Born: 10 October 1948 Smârdan, Tulcea, Romania
- Died: c. 19 March 2025 (aged 76) Bucharest, Romania
- Height: 175 cm (5 ft 9 in)

Sport
- Sport: Boxing
- Club: Dinamo București
Medal record
Representing Romania
Romania National Amateur Boxing Championships
Gold medal – first place	1968 Bucharest	-60 kg
Gold medal – first place	1969 Bucharest	-60 kg
Gold medal – first place	1970 Bucharest	-63.5 kg
Silver medal – second place	1971 Bucharest	-63.5 kg
Gold medal – first place	1972 Bucharest	-63.5 kg
Gold medal – first place	1973 Cluj	-63.5 kg
Gold medal – first place	1974 Bucharest	-63.5 kg
Gold medal – first place	1975 Bucharest	-63.5 kg
Gold medal – first place	1976 Bucharest	-63.5 kg
Gold medal – first place	1977 Bucharest	-63.5 kg
Olympic Games
Bronze medal – third place	1968 Mexico City	-60 kg
European Amateur Championships
Gold medal – first place	1969 Bucharest	-60 kg
Silver medal – second place	1971 Madrid	-63.5 kg
Bronze medal – third place	1977 Halle	-63.5 kg

Calistrat Ilie Cuțov (10 October 1948 – c. 19 March 2025) was a Romanian boxer who won the European lightweight title in 1969 and an Olympic bronze medal in 1968. He also competed in the light-welterweight division at the 1972 and 1976 Olympics, but was eliminated before reaching the semifinals. He retired after winning a bronze medal at the 1977 European Championships, with a record of 11 losses out of 398 bouts. From 1981 onwards, he worked as a boxing coach. His trainees include Daniel Dumitrescu.

== Background ==
Cuțov was born in Smârdan, Tulcea, Romania on 10 October 1948. His younger brother Simion was also an Olympic medalist in boxing. Calistrat Cuțov's body was discovered at his home in Bucharest on 19 March 2025, around a week after he had died at the age of 76.

== Awards ==
- Honored Sports Trainer ("Antrenor emerit al sportului").
- Sports Merit Order, Third Class (1968 and 2004)

== 1972 Olympic results ==
Below are the results of Cailstrat Cutov at the 1972 Munich Olympics:

- Round of 32: defeated Mohamed Muruli (Uganda) 4-1
- Round of 16: lost to Srisook Buntoe (Thailand) by a third-round TKO
