= Sayed Abdel Gadir =

Sudanese boxer (born 1936)

Personal information
- Nationality: Sudanese
- Born: 22 September 1936; Malakal, Sudan
- Height: 1.80 m (5 ft 11 in)
- Weight: 56 kg (123 lb)

Sport
- Sport: Boxing

Sayed Abdel Gadir (born 22 September 1936) is a Sudanese boxer. He competed in the 1960 and 1968 Summer Olympics.
