= Stoyan Pilichev =

Bulgarian boxer

Medal record

Men's Boxing

Representing Bulgaria

European Amateur Championships
Silver medal – second place	1969 Bucharest	Lightweight

1969 European Boxing Championships. Stoyan Pilichev (Bulgaria) and Calistrat Cuțov (Romania)

Stoyan Angelov Pilichev (Стоян Ангелов Пиличев, born November 20, 1938, Chiroko, Bulgaria) was a Bulgarian boxer who competed in the lightweight category at the 1964 and 1968 Summer Olympics, as a member of the Bulgarian national boxing team. In the 1964 Summer Olympics he lost to Józef Grudzień from Poland in the quarter-final. In the 1968 Summer Olympics he lost to Calistrat Cuțov from Romania in the quarter-final. Pilichev represented Bulgaria in the lightweight category of the 1969 European Amateur Boxing Championships. After reaching the final, he faced Calistrat Cuțov from Romania, in a rematch of 1968 Mexico City quarter-final, and he lost on points, resulting in winning the silver medal of the division.
