= Nowy Korczyn =

- Town
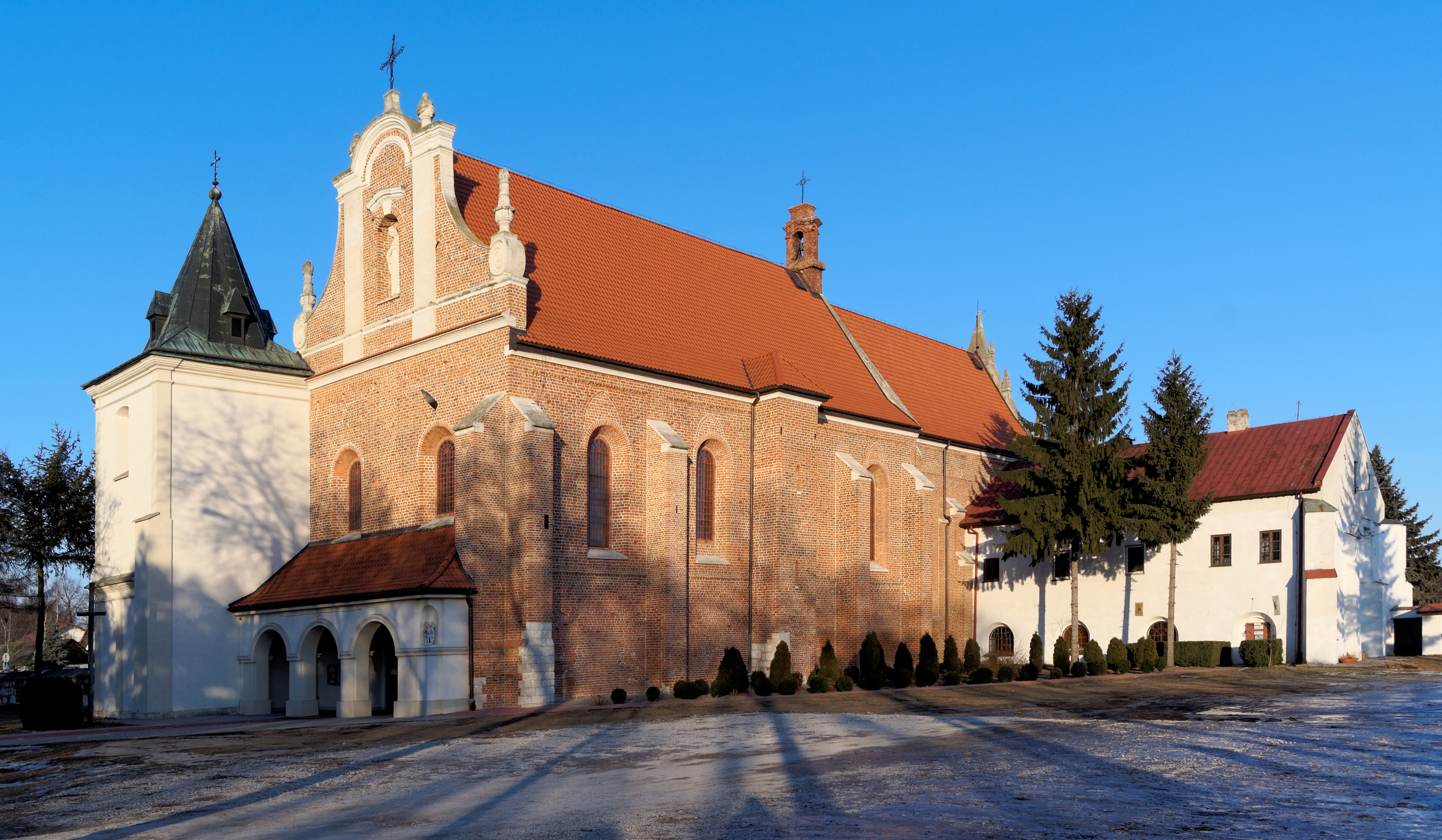
- Saint Stanislaus Church

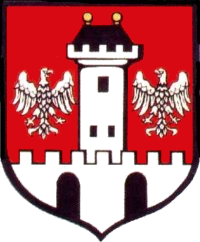
- Coat of arms

- Location within Poland
- Coordinates: 50°17′57″N 20°48′32″E
- Country: Poland
- Voivodeship: Świętokrzyskie
- County: Busko
- Gmina: Nowy Korczyn
- Town rights: 1258

Population
  - Total: 1,032
- Time zone: UTC+1 (CET)
  - Summer (DST): UTC+2 (CEST)
- Vehicle registration: TBU

Nowy Korczyn [ˈnɔvɨ ˈkɔrt͡ʂɨn] is a small town in Busko County, Świętokrzyskie Voivodeship, in southern Poland. It is the seat of the gmina (administrative district) called Gmina Nowy Korczyn. It lies in Lesser Poland, approximately 20 km (12 mi) south of Busko-Zdrój and 67 km (42 mi) south of the regional capital Kielce. It is located close to the confluence of the Nida and the Vistula rivers.

== History ==
The town was known as Nowe Miasto Korczyn (New Town Korczyn). During its existence, Nowy Korczyn was also known as Khadash, Nayshtut, Neustadt, Novi Kochin, and Novi Kortchin. It was established before 1258 by Boleslaus the Chaste, and used to be an important trade and political center. From the 15th century onwards the General Assembly of Lesser Poland was held there. In the 17th century the town began a decline, and lost its town status in 1869. Up until the Second World War, Nowy Korczyn, by now a village, had a large Jewish community, many of whose members were murdered in the Holocaust.

=== Early history ===
In the Middle Ages, Nowy Korczyn was a trade village, located on a junction of busy merchant roads from Kraków to Kievan Rus', and from Kosice to Sandomierz. To distinguish it from the nearby village of Korczyn (now known as Stary Korczyn, Old Korczyn), Prince Boleslaus V the Chaste named the town Nowe Miasto Korczyn (New Town Korczyn), when he granted it Magdeburg rights (1258). In 1257, when the Duke stayed here with his wife Kinga of Poland, the pious couple decided to found a Franciscan abbey in Nowy Korczyn. The town quickly developed, due to its location, and proximity both to the Vistula waterway and the city of Kraków, where local princes resided during the fragmentation of Poland (see History of Poland during the Piast dynasty). It had a wooden castle, which, together with the town, was burned by the Rus warriors in 1300. New, stone castle was built here in the 1350s by King Casimir III the Great, and it quickly emerged as one of the major royal residences in Poland. A defensive wall was built around Nowy Korczyn, furthermore the town was protected by a man-made lake Czartoria.

Since Nowy Korczyn is located in the center of Lesser Poland, the town was frequently visited by Polish rulers. It was an important political and judicial center of the province, here Lesser Poland's szlachta organized its meetings. In 1404, King Władysław Jagiełło called such a meeting, to discuss new taxes, needed for the planned purchase of the Dobrzyń Land from the Teutonic Knights. In 1438, also in Korczyn, the szlachta convened to discuss whether King Jagiełło should accept the Bohemian crown. On April 25 of the same year, powerful Cardinal Zbigniew Oleśnicki, who opposed Polish alliance with Czech Hussites, called a Confederation here. In 1439, Polish supporters of the Hussites gathered near Nowy Korczyn, under Spytek of Melsztyn. On 4 May 1439 the royal army under Oleśnicki defeated the Hussites in the Battle of Grotniki.

In the 15th century, several important meetings and events took place at the Nowy Korczyn castle. In 1461, King Casimir IV Jagiellon hosted here envoys of George of Poděbrady, the Crimean Khanate, and the Margraviate of Brandenburg, and in 1465, szlachta of both Lesser and Greater Poland gathered here to discuss finances needed to end the Thirteen Years' War. In 1470, Casimir IV Jagiellon met at the Nowy Korczyn castle with papal legate and envoy of Emperor Frederick III. On 9 October 1479 Martin Truchseß von Wetzhausen, Grand Master of the Teutonic Knights, paid homage to the Polish king at Nowy Korczyn.

=== Flourishing regional center ===
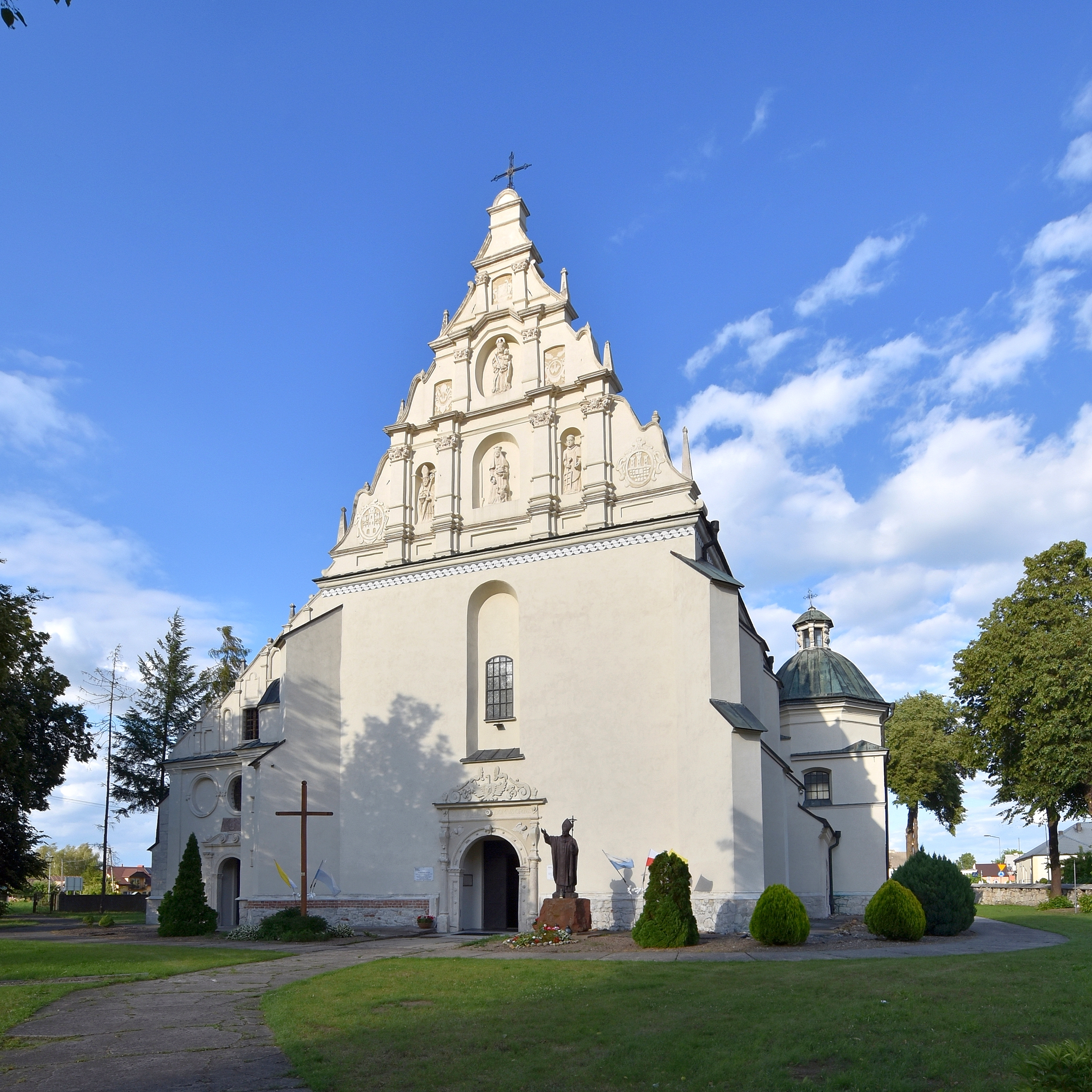
Gothic-Renaissance Holy Trinity church

In the Kingdom of Poland, Nowy Korczyn was one of the most important administrative centers of the vast province of Lesser Poland. Here Lesser Poland sejmiks took place, in which regional senators and deputies of the Sejm met to discuss and coordinate their policies. The Nowy Korczyn sejmiks included representatives from Kraków Voivodeship, Sandomierz Voivodeship, Lublin Voivodeship, Podole Voivodeship, and Volhynian Voivodeship. Furthermore, the town was the seat of a starosta (one of six starostas of Sandomierz Voivodeship), and the seat of court for the Wiślica and Pilzno counties.

In 1474 most of Nowy Korczyn burned in a fire, after which the town was released from its tax duties for 12 years. In 1549, King Sigismund II Augustus funded a hospital, and at that time, Korczyn was a major beer producer, with 19 small breweries. Furthermore, it had waterworks and baths, built in 1578 with permission of King Stephen Bathory. Eight times a year grain markets were organized, and the grain purchased in Nowy Korczyn was transported along the Vistula to Gdańsk. Korczyn had a number of granaries, in 1566 a new town hall was built, and in 1568 a canal was completed, which connected the man-made lake Czartoria with the Nida river. In 1589, a weapon manufacturer was opened in Nowy Korczyn, producing gunpowder, cannons and rifles.

=== Decline and partitions ===
The importance of the town diminished in the early 17th century, after the capital of the Commonwealth was moved from Kraków to Warsaw. In 1606, during the Zebrzydowski Rebellion, Korczyn was ransacked by the rebels, and in 1607, almost whole town with its 266 houses burned in a fire. Further and complete destruction came during the Swedish invasion of Poland, when in 1657 the town was burned to the ground, together with its extensive archives. In 1702, during the Great Northern War, Swedish troops destroyed Korczyn once again, and the town never recovered since then.

After the Partitions of Poland, Nowy Korczyn briefly belonged to the Austrian Empire. After the Polish victory in the Austro-Polish War of 1809, it became part of the short-lived Duchy of Warsaw, and after the duchy's dissolution in 1815, it was part of Russian-controlled Congress Poland. Nowy Korczyn burned in 1811, 1855 and 1857, and the town was frequently flooded both by the Vistula and the Nida. In 1860, Nowy Korczyn had a population of 3,319, including 2,370 Jews. In 1869, Russian authorities stripped it of the town charter as punishment for the unsuccessful Polish January Uprising.

=== 20th century ===
During World War I, in September 1914, Nowy Korczyn was the area where Polish Legions operated. Here the headquarters of Józef Piłsudski was briefly stationed, and after the war, the village belonged to Kielce Voivodeship. In the Second Polish Republic it remained a poor village, with a significant Jewish population.

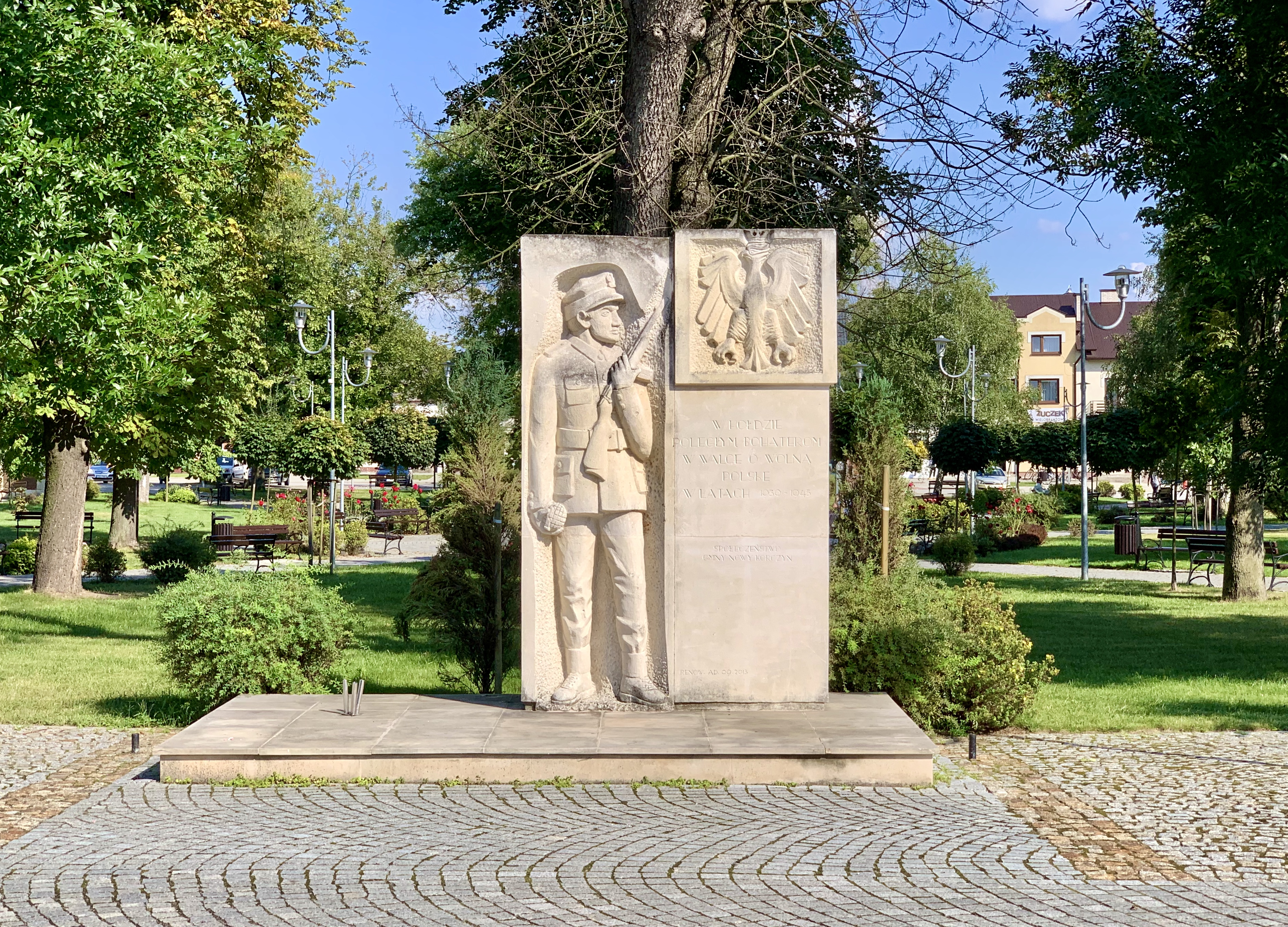
World War II memorial

Following the German-Soviet invasion of Poland, which started World War II in September 1939, it was occupied by Germany. In 1942, the Jews of Nowy Korczyn were deported to the Treblinka extermination camp and murdered. Concerning the deportation of the Jews of Nowy Korczyn, a witness stated the following: "In the night of November 2. in 1942 Nowy Korczyn was surrounded by the German military and two Ukrainian units. The Jews of the town were chased to the town square - or rather a market place in the centre of the town. There could have been 2000 Jews or 3000 or more, I don't know, different figures are mentioned. However, all the Jews of Nowy Korczyn were deported [...]". In 1944, during Operation Tempest, units of the Home Army attacked German police post in Nowy Korczyn. The synagogue of Nowy Korczyn has been under preservation since 2014.

== Transport ==
Nowy Korczyn does not have a train station. Since 10th December 2025 the town is bypassed to the west by National Road Nr 79 (Warsaw - Bytom), and local road nr. 973, which goes from Tarnów to Busko. The Borusowa Ferry, a reaction cable ferry, crosses the River Vistula between Borusowa and Nowy Korczyn.

== Points of interest ==
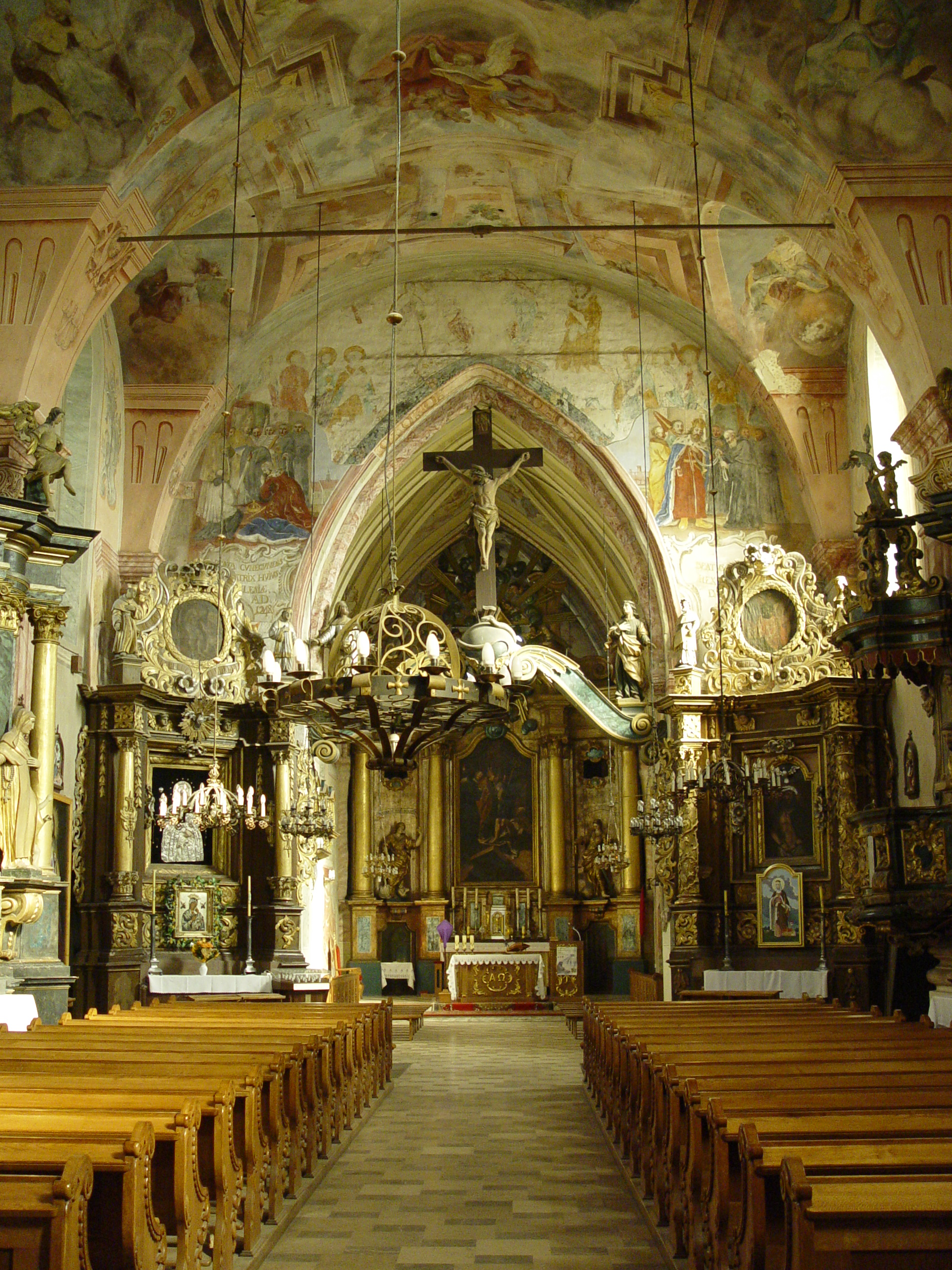
Baroque interior of the Saint Stanislaus church

- complex of former Franciscan abbey (1257), with a Gothic church of St. Stanislaus,
- Gothic-Renaissance church of Holy Trinity (16th century),
- ruins of the 18th century synagogue,
- house of Jan Długosz (16th century), which housed the Nowy Korczyn Protestant Academy,
- houses from the 16th, 17th and 18th century,
- 19th century Russian Cemetery, where Russian civil servants and soldiers were buried.
