= List of United States national amateur boxing lightweight champions =

Below is a list of National Amateur Boxing Lightweight Champions, also known as United States Amateur Champions, along with the state or region which they represented. The weight class was contested at 135 pounds between 1888 and 1951. It has been contested at 132 pounds, since 1952. The United States National Boxing Championships bestow the title of United States Amateur Champion on amateur boxers for winning the annual national amateur boxing tournament organized by USA Boxing, the national governing body for Olympic boxing and is the United States' member organization of the International Amateur Boxing Association (AIBA). It is one of the four premier amateur boxing tournaments, the others being the National Golden Gloves Tournament, which crowns its own amateur lightweight champion, the Police Athletic League Tournament, and the United States Armed Forces Tournament, all sending champions to the US Olympic Trials.

- 1888 – T. Thompson, NYAC
- 1889 – E.F. Walker, Navy/Philadelphia, PA
- 1890 – J. Rice, VBC
- 1891 – O.H. Zeigler, Philadelphia, PA
- 1892 – Not held
- 1893 – H.M. Leeds, PASC
- 1894 – C.J. Gehring, Baltimore, MD
- 1895 – J. Quinn, Bedford, MA
- 1896 – James Pyne, New York, NY
- 1897 – Ed Dix, Philadelphia, PA
- 1898 – Not held
- 1899 – G. Jensen, New York, NY
- 1900 – J. Hopkins, New York, NY
- 1901 – J.F. Mumford, New York, NY
- 1902 – John Dillon, New York, NY
- 1903 – John Leavy, New York, NY
- 1904 – Goliath Jones, Cambridge, MA
- 1905 – Ambrose McGarry, New York, NY
- 1906 – Lew Powell, San Francisco, CA
- 1907 – Joseph Doyle, New York, NY
- 1908 – J. Denning, New York, NY
- 1909 – Billy Shevlin, New Jersey
- 1910 – William Volk, Quincy, MA
- 1911 – James Jarvis, New York, NY
- 1912 – Al Wambsgans, New Orleans, LA
- 1913 – M.J. Crowley, Malden, MA
- 1914 – D. Stosh, Cleveland, OH
- 1915 – M.J. Crowley, Malden, MA
- 1916 – Thomas Murphy, Kansas City, MO
- 1917 – Thomas Murphy, Kansas City, MO
- 1918 – Thomas O'Malley, Philadelphia, PA
- 1919 – Frank Cassidy, New York, NY
- 1920 – Thomas Murphy, Kansas City, MO
- 1921 – Ben Ponteau, New York, NY
- 1922 – Joe Ryan, Pittsburgh, PA
- 1923 – John McManus, Boston, MA
- 1924 – Fred Boyistein, Pittsburgh, PA
- 1925 – J. McGonigal, Weymouth, MA
- 1926 – Thomas Lown, New York, NY
- 1927 – Francis Burke, San Francisco, CA
- 1928 – Steve Halaiko, Buffalo, NY
- 1929 – Steve Halaiko, Buffalo, NY
- 1930 – Alex Santora, New York, NY
- 1931 – Al Gomez, San Francisco, CA
- 1932 – Nat Bor, Fall River, MA
- 1933 – Frank Eagan, Buffalo, NY
- 1934 – Norbert Meehan, San Francisco, CA
- 1935 – W. Beauhod, St. Louis, MO
- 1936 – Thomas Pallatin, South Bend, IN
- 1937 – Joseph Kelly, Philadelphia, PA
- 1938 – Richard Ford, Lawrence, MA
- 1939 – George Toy, Cleveland, OH
- 1940 – Paul Matsumoto, Honolulu, HI
- 1941 – Frankie Thompson, Florence, AL
- 1942 – R. McQuillan, Lackawanna, NY
- 1943 – Charles Hunter, Cleveland, OH
- 1944 – Joey D'Amato, Warren, OH
- 1945 – Jetson Arnold, Philadelphia, PA
- 1946 – Joseph Discepoli, Marines
- 1947 – Frankie Thompson, Florence, AL
- 1948 – Frankie Thompson, Florence, AL
- 1949 – Charles Adkins, Gary, IN
- 1950 – Frankie Thompson, Florence, AL
- 1951 – Jimmy Hackney, Philadelphia, PA
- 1952 – John Barnes, Detroit, MI
- 1953 – Frank Smith, Cincinnati, OH
- 1954 – Garnet Hart, Philadelphia, PA
- 1955 – Jack Puscas, Portland, OR
- 1956 – Bill Cherry, Cleveland, OH
- 1957 – Gene Gresham, Detroit, MI
- 1958 – Adam Ellison, Columbus, OH
- 1959 – Quincy Daniels, Seattle, WA
- 1960 – Brian O'Shea, Chicago, IL
- 1961 – Woodie Marcus, Pocatello, ID
- 1962 – George Foster, Cincinnati, OH
- 1963 – Manuel Rameriz, San Jose, CA
- 1964 – Ronnie Harris, Detroit, MI
- 1965 – Herb Dolloson, Washington, DC
- 1966 – Ronnie Harris, Canton, OH
- 1967 – Ronnie Harris, Canton, OH
- 1968 – Ronnie Harris, Canton, OH
- 1969 – Juan Ruiz, Air Force
- 1970 – James Parks, Marines
- 1971 – James Busceme, Beaumont, TX
- 1972 – Norman Goins, Edinburg, IN
- 1973 – Aaron Pryor, Cincinnati, OH
- 1974 – Hilmer Kenty, Columbus, OH
- 1975 – Hilmer Kenty, Columbus, OH
- 1976 – Howard Davis, Jr., Glen Cove, NY
- 1977 – Anthony Fletcher, Philadelphia, PA
- 1978 – Melvin Paul, New Orleans, LA
- 1979 – Davey Lee Armstrong, Tacoma, WA
- 1980 – Melvin Paul, New Orleans, LA
- 1981 – Joe Manley, Army
- 1982 – Pernell Whitaker, Norfolk, VA (spring), Clifford Gray Florida (winter
- 1983 – Clifford Gray Florida
- 1984 – Victor Levine, Kokomo, IN
- 1985 – Vince Phillips, Army
- 1986 – Vince Phillips, Army
- 1987 – Charles Murray
- 1988 – Romallis Ellis, Ellenwood, GA
- 1989 – Shane Mosley, Pomona, CA
- 1990 – Shane Mosley, Pomona, CA
- 1991 – Oscar De La Hoya, Los Angeles, CA
- 1992 – Patrice Brooks, St. Louis, MO
- 1993 – Abayomi Miller, Ohio
- 1994 – Fernando Vargas, Oxnard, CA
- 1995 – Terrance Cauthen, Philadelphia, PA
- 1996 – Brian Adams
- 1997 – David Jackson, Seattle, WA
- 1998 – Jacob Hudson, Augusta, GA
- 1999 – Jacob Hudson, Augusta, GA
- 2000 – Rock Allen, Philadelphia, PA
- 2001 – Paulie Malignaggi, Brooklyn, NY
- 2002 – Verquan Kimbrough, Aliquippa, PA
- 2003 – Vicente Escobedo, Woodland, CA
- 2004 – David Rodela, Oxnard, CA
- 2005 – Michael Evans, Dayton, OH
- 2006 – Danny García, Philadelphia, PA
- 2007 – Diego Magdaleno, Las Vegas, NV
- 2008 – James Brumley Manchester Kentucky
- 2009 – Duran Caffero, Jr., Helena, MT
- 2010 – José Ramírez, Avenal, CA
- 2011 – José Ramírez, Avenal, CA
- 2012 – José Ramírez, Avenal, CA
- 2023 - Dedrick Crocklem, Tacoma, WA
