= Alfonso Frazer =

Panamanian boxer (born 1948)

Personal information
- Nickname: Peppermint
- Born: Alfonso Gerald Frazer; January 4, 1948 (age 78) Panama City, Panama
- Height: 5 ft 8 in (173 cm)
- Weight: Light welterweight

Boxing career
- Stance: Orthodox

Boxing record
- Total fights: 63
- Wins: 43
- Win by KO: 30
- Losses: 17
- Draws: 3

Alfonso Gerald Frazer (born January 4, 1948) is a former Panamanian boxer who held the Lineal and WBA Light welterweight titles. He competed in the men's featherweight event at the 1964 Summer Olympics.

== 1964 Olympic results ==
Below is the record of Alfonso Gerald Frazer, a Panamanian featherweight boxer who competed at the 1964 Tokyo Olympics:

- Round of 32: lost to Heinz Schulz (German Unified Team) referee stopped contest

== Professional career ==
Known as "Peppermint," Frazer began his professional career in 1965 and won the Lineal and World Boxing Association light welterweight titles by defeating Nicolino Locche by unanimous decision in 1972. He lost the belt in his first defense by knockout to Antonio Cervantes later that year, and also lost a rematch to Cervantes by TKO in 1973.He fought future champion Aaron Pryor in 1979 and was TKO'd in the fifth round. He never challenged for a major title again, and retired in 1981.

== Professional boxing record ==
63 fights	43 wins	17 losses
By knockout	30	11
By decision	13	6
Draws	3	

No.	Result	Record	Opponent	Type	Round, time	Date	Location	Notes
63	Loss	43–17–3	Ernesto Davis	UD	10	May 2, 1981	Gimnasio Nuevo Panama, Panama City, Panama	
62	Win	43–16–3	Felix Sune	KO	8 (10)	Apr 4, 1981	Gimnasio Nuevo Panama, Panama City, Panama	
61	Loss	42–16–3	Miguel Montilla	TKO	9 (10)	Oct 20, 1980	Santo Domingo, Dominican Republic	
60	Loss	42–15–3	Tony Chiaverini	UD	10	Mar 7, 1980	Municipal Auditorium, Kansas City, Missouri, U.S.	
59	Loss	42–14–3	Aaron Pryor	TKO	5 (10), 2:40	Oct 20, 1979	Riverfront Coliseum, Cincinnati, Ohio, U.S.	
58	Loss	42–13–3	Tommy Ortiz	UD	10	May 5, 1979	Arena de Colon, Colon City, Panama	
57	Loss	42–12–3	Zenon Silgado	KO	5 (12)	Feb 10, 1979	Plaza Monumental, Cartagena, Colombia	For vacant South American light welterweight title
56	Win	42–11–3	Osvaldo Romero	UD	10	Oct 21, 1978	Plaza de Toros de Cartagena de Indias, Cartagena, Colombia	
55	Draw	41–11–3	Ariel Maciel	PTS	10	Aug 10, 1978	Guayaquil, Ecuador	
54	Win	41–11–2	Ramiro Bolanos	TKO	15 (15)	Jun 17, 1978	Quito, Ecuador	Won vacant WBC Continental Americas light welterweight title
53	Draw	40–11–2	Ramiro Bolanos	TD	8 (10)	Apr 29, 1978	Quito, Ecuador	
52	Win	40–11–1	Zenon Silgado	UD	10	Aug 6, 1977	Gimnasio Nuevo Panama, Panama City, Panama	
51	Win	39–11–1	Pedro Nunez	MD	10	May 14, 1977	Gimnasio Nuevo Panama, Panama City, Panama	
50	Win	38–11–1	Francisco Martinez	TKO	6 (10)	Nov 20, 1976	Gimnasio Nuevo Panama, Panama City, Panama	
49	Loss	37–11–1	Emiliano Villa	PTS	10	Oct 4, 1975	Barranquilla, Colombia	
48	Win	37–10–1	Rudy Barro	UD	10	Jun 21, 1975	Gimnasio Nuevo Panama, Panama City, Panama	
47	Win	36–10–1	Jose Blanco	TKO	2 (10)	Mar 2, 1975	Gimnasio Nuevo Panama, Panama City, Panama	
46	Loss	35–10–1	Hector Thompson	TKO	7 (10)	Oct 25, 1974	Festival Hall, Brisbane, Australia	
45	Loss	35–9–1	Daniel Aldo Gonzalez	PTS	10	Jul 13, 1974	Estadio Luna Park, Buenos Aires, Argentina	
44	Loss	35–8–1	Victor Ortiz	UD	10	May 10, 1974	Coliseo Roberto Clemente, San Juan, Puerto Rico	
43	Win	35–7–1	Emiliano Villa	TKO	8 (10)	Mar 23, 1974	Coliseo Humberto Perea, Barranquilla, Colombia	
42	Loss	34–7–1	Esteban de Jesús	KO	10 (10)	Jan 7, 1974	Coliseo Roberto Clemente, San Juan, Puerto Rico	
41	Win	34–6–1	Ray Mercado	KO	2 (10)	Nov 19, 1973	San Juan, Puerto Rico	
40	Win	33–6–1	Jose Peterson	KO	6 (12), 2:45	Sep 8, 1973	Gimnasio Nuevo Panama, Panama City, Panama	Won vacant WBA Fedelatin light welterweight title
39	Win	32–6–1	Victor Ortiz	UD	10	Jul 14, 1973	Roberto Clemente Coliseum, San Juan, Puerto Rico	
38	Loss	31–6–1	Antonio Cervantes	TKO	5 (15), 1:38	May 19, 1973	Gimnasio Nuevo Panama, Panama City, Panama	For WBA and The Ring light welterweight titles
37	Win	31–5–1	Raul Montoya	UD	10	Jan 20, 1973	Gimnasio Nuevo Panama, Panama City, Panama	
36	Loss	30–5–1	Antonio Cervantes	KO	10 (15), 1:15	Oct 28, 1972	Gimnasio Nuevo Panama, Panama City, Panama	Lost WBA and The Ring light welterweight titles
35	Win	30–4–1	Juan Corradi	KO	3 (10)	Sep 16, 1972	Gimnasio Nacional, San Salvador, El Salvador	
34	Win	29–4–1	Carlos Aro	KO	1 (10), 0:59	Sep 2, 1972	Gimnasio Nuevo Panama, Panama City, Panama	
33	Win	28–4–1	Al Ford	TKO	5 (10)	Jul 17, 1972	Gimnasio Nuevo Panama, Panama City, Panama	
32	Win	27–4–1	Nicolino Locche	UD	15	Mar 10, 1972	Gimnasio Nuevo Panama, Panama City, Panama	Won WBA and The Ring light welterweight titles
31	Win	26–4–1	Isaac Marin	TKO	8 (10)	Oct 30, 1971	Gimnasio Nacional, San Jose, Costa Rica	
30	Win	25–4–1	Eddie Linder	PTS	10	Jul 31, 1971	Gimnasio Nuevo Panama, Panama City, Panama	
29	Win	24–4–1	Eduardo Moreno	UD	10	Apr 29, 1971	Gimnasio Nacional, San Jose, Costa Rica	
28	Win	23–4–1	Jaguar Kakizawa	UD	10	Mar 15, 1971	Gimnasio Nacional, San Jose, Costa Rica	
27	Win	22–4–1	Arturo Morales	TKO	4 (10)	Feb 18, 1971	Gimnasio Nacional, San Jose, Costa Rica	
26	Win	21–4–1	Hector Sanchez	TKO	11 (12), 0:56	Nov 29, 1970	Gimnasio Neco de la Guardia, Panama City, Panama	
25	Win	20–4–1	Efren Jimenez	TKO	6 (10)	Oct 15, 1970	Gimnasio Nacional, San Jose, Costa Rica	
24	Draw	19–4–1	Eddie Blay	PTS	8	Jun 26, 1970	Palacio de los Deportes, Madrid, Spain	
23	Win	19–4	Jose Baquero	KO	1 (8)	Jun 18, 1970	Pabellón Municipal de Deportes La Casilla, Bilbao, Spain	
22	Win	18–4	Eugenio Espinoza	KO	8 (10)	Mar 8, 1970	Quito, Ecuador	
21	Win	17–4	Wesley Hines	KO	2 (10)	Dec 21, 1969	Arena de Colon, Colon City, Panama	
20	Win	16–4	Antonio Herrera	KO	2 (10), 1:13	Sep 21, 1969	Gimnasio Neco de la Guardia, Panama City, Panama	
19	Loss	15–4	Chango Carmona	TKO	3 (10), 1:19	Jul 26, 1969	Arena México, Mexico City, Mexico	
18	Win	15–3	Getulio Bruges	KO	2 (10)	Feb 9, 1969	Gimnasio Neco de la Guardia, Panama City, Panama	
17	Win	14–3	Julio Ruiz	TKO	10 (12), 2:05	Nov 30, 1968	Gimnasio Neco de la Guardia, Panama City, Panama	Won vacant Panamanian lightweight title
16	Win	13–3	Ernesto Ortega	UD	10	Sep 6, 1968	National Maritime Union Hall, New York City, New York, U.S.	
15	Win	12–3	Juancho Ruiz	MD	10	Dec 2, 1967	Arena de Colon, Colon City, Panama	
14	Loss	11–3	Julio Viera	KO	3 (10)	Jun 19, 1967	Nuevo Circo, Caracas, Venezuela	
13	Loss	11–2	Justiniano Aguilar	TKO	9 (12)	Dec 17, 1966	Arena de Colon, Colon City, Panama	For Panamanian super featherweight title
12	Win	11–1	Javier Valle	KO	3 (10)	Oct 2, 1966	Arena de Colon, Colon City, Panama	
11	Win	10–1	Juancho Ruiz	KO	8 (12), 2:30	Aug 28, 1966	Arena de Colon, Colon City, Panama	
10	Loss	9–1	Luis Patino	TKO	8 (10), 0:37	Jun 12, 1966	Gimnasio Neco de la Guardia, Panama City, Panama	
9	Win	9–0	Eduardo Frutos	TKO	7 (10), 1:51	Jan 29, 1966	Estadio Juan Demóstenes Arosemena, Panama City, Panama	
8	Win	8–0	Jerry Powers	TKO	8 (10), 2:55	Nov 28, 1965	Arena de Colon, Colon City, Panama	
7	Win	7–0	Cruz Arbelo	KO	2 (10), 1:00	Oct 17, 1965	Arena de Colon, Colon City, Panama	
6	Win	6–0	Eduardo Frutos	MD	8	Sep 5, 1965	Arena de Colon, Colon City, Panama	
5	Win	5–0	Basilio Williams	KO	2 (6)	Jun 19, 1965	Estadio Nacional, Panama City, Panama	
4	Win	4–0	Daniel Hernandez	KO	1 (6)	Jun 6, 1965	Arena de Colon, Colon City, Panama	
3	Win	3–0	Abelardo Racero	KO	1 (4)	May 23, 1965	Arena de Colon, Colon City, Panama	
2	Win	2–0	Carlos Mariano	KO	2 (4)	Apr 25, 1965	Arena de Colon, Colon City, Panama	
1	Win	1–0	Luis Carlos	KO	1 (4)	Apr 10, 1965	Estadio Nacional, Panama City, Panama	

== See also ==
- List of world light-welterweight boxing champions

Sporting positions
World boxing titles
Preceded by Nicolino Locche	WBA light welterweight champion 10 March 1972 – 28 October 1972	Succeeded by Antonio Cervantes
Preceded by Nicolino Locche	The Ring light welterweight champion 10 March 1972 – 28 October 1972	Succeeded by Antonio Cervantes
