= Nicolino Locche =

Argentine boxer

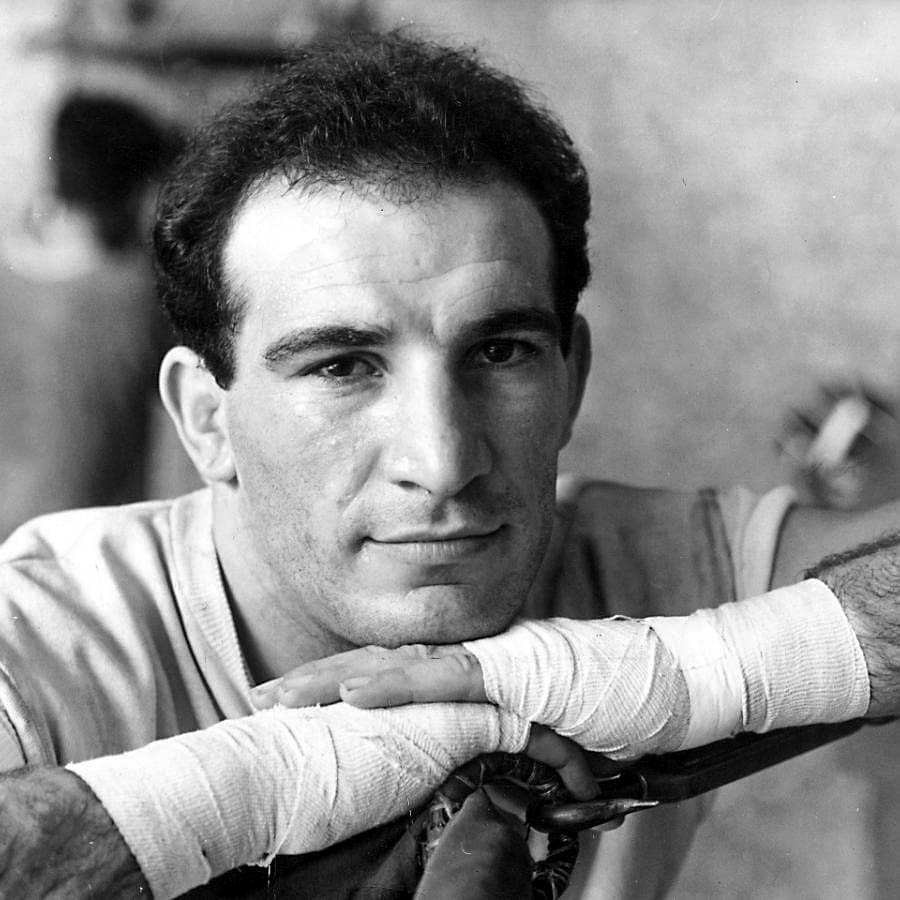

Personal information
- Nickname: El Intocable (The Untouchable)
- Born: Nicolino Felipe Locche; 2 September 1939 Tunuyán, Mendoza, Argentina
- Died: 7 September 2005 (aged 66) Las Heras, Mendoza, Argentina
- Height: 5 ft 6 in (168 cm)
- Weight: Lightweight; Light welterweight

Boxing career
- Reach: 71 1/2 in (182 cm)
- Stance: Orthodox

Boxing record
- Total fights: 136
- Wins: 117
- Win by KO: 14
- Losses: 4
- Draws: 14
- No contests: 1

Nicolino Locche (September 2, 1939 – September 7, 2005) was an Argentine professional boxer who held the World Junior Welterweight title from 1968 to 1972. Born in Mendoza, Locche turned professional at the age of 19 and amassed a record of 117-4-14 (14 draws). He had several successful defenses including one over Antonio Cervantes. Regarded as one of the greatest defensive boxers of all time, his way of frustrating his foes with minimum head movement and shoulder rolls to avoid most of their punches earned him the moniker 'El Intocable' (the Untouchable).

Locche was inducted into the International Boxing Hall Of Fame in 2003. He died in Las Heras in 2005 of heart failure.

== Boxing career ==
His family came from the Sardinian village of Villasor, located near Cagliari. Locche was known as "El Intocable" ("The Untouchable") due to his defensive mastery, and became the Lineal and WBA Light Welterweight Champion in Tokyo, Japan on December 12, 1968, after defeating Paul Takeshi Fuji by technical knockout after Fuji refused to start the 10th round out of frustration because of exhaustion and his inability to connect punches on "The Untouchable," according to the Argentine boxing commentators' recount of the bout (Dotora, 2004).

Locche became popular Argentina and routinely sold out the Luna Park, Buenos Aires when he fought at the well known boxing arena. Known for his style and reflexes, he would perform moves such as standing in front of his opponents with his hands lowered at his sides, behind his back or even resting on his knees while dodging punches.

Numerous Argentine sources also cite the fact that Locche's approach towards submitting himself to traditional boxing training and discipline was sometimes lackadaisical. For example, Locche was a known habitual cigarette smoker throughout most if not all of his boxing career and his adherence to the strict dietary requirements of his trade was often quite flexible. It was not unusual to see this in the seconds there was a crowd around him during the one minute break between rounds where he would be puffing furiously on a cigarette.

Locche defended his title six times, against Carlos Hernandez, João Henrique, Adolph Pruitt, Antonio Cervantes and Domingo Barrera Corpas, before losing it to Alfonso Frazer in Panama on March 10, 1972. Locche failed to regain the World Champion belt in a rematch with Cervantes and retired in 1975.

He was champion of Mendoza, Argentina, and South American lightweight and Jr. welterweight. Locche turned professional at the age of 19 and amassed a record of 117-4-14 (14 draws). He was inducted to the International Boxing Hall of Fame in 2003. The Ring has retroactively certified him as lineal Junior Welterweight champion from 1968 to 1972.

== Professional boxing record ==
136 fights	117 wins	4 losses
By knockout	14	1
By decision	103	3
Draws	14	
No contests	1	

No.	Result	Record	Opponent	Type	Round, time	Date	Location	Notes
136	Win	117–4–14 (1)	Ricardo Molina	PTS	10	Aug 7, 1976	San Carlos de Bariloche, Argentina	
135	Win	116–4–14 (1)	Lorenzo Trujillo	UD	10	May 8, 1976	Estadio Luna Park, Buenos Aires, Argentina	
134	Win	115–4–14 (1)	Emilio Villa	PTS	10	Jan 17, 1976	Estadio Luna Park, Buenos Aires, Argentina	
133	Win	114–4–14 (1)	Obdulio Rogelio Zarza	PTS	10	Dec 19, 1975	Rio Cuarto, Argentina	
132	Win	113–4–14 (1)	Jimmy Heair	UD	10	Oct 17, 1975	Estadio Luna Park, Buenos Aires, Argentina	
131	Win	112–4–14 (1)	Omar Hermelindo Zarza	PTS	10	Sep 13, 1975	Venado Tuerto, Argentina	
130	Win	111–4–14 (1)	Javier Ayala	PTS	10	Aug 9, 1975	Estadio Luna Park, Buenos Aires, Argentina	
129	Loss	110–4–14 (1)	Antonio Cervantes	RTD	10 (15), 3:00	Mar 17, 1973	Maestranza Cesar Giron, Maracay, Venezuela	For WBA and The Ring light welterweight titles
128	Win	110–3–14 (1)	Benny Huertas	PTS	10	Feb 9, 1973	Club Gimnasia y Esgrima, Ciudad Mendoza, Argentina	
127	Win	109–3–14 (1)	Pedro Adigue Jr.	PTS	10	Jan 25, 1973	Estadio Luna Park, Buenos Aires, Argentina	
126	Win	108–3–14 (1)	Ray Mercado	PTS	10	Dec 16, 1972	Estadio Luna Park, Buenos Aires, Argentina	
125	Win	107–3–14 (1)	Gerardo Ferrat	PTS	10	Nov 18, 1972	Estadio Luna Park, Buenos Aires, Argentina	
124	Loss	106–3–14 (1)	Alfonso Frazer	UD	15	Mar 10, 1972	Gimnasio Nuevo Panama, Panama City, Panama	Lost WBA and The Ring light welterweight titles
123	Win	106–2–14 (1)	Nicolas Arkuzsyn	PTS	10	Feb 16, 1972	Cruz del Eje, Argentina	
122	Win	105–2–14 (1)	Juan Carlos Peralta	PTS	10	Feb 4, 1972	San Juan, Argentina	
121	Win	104–2–14 (1)	Antonio Cervantes	UD	15	Dec 11, 1971	Estadio Luna Park, Buenos Aires, Argentina	Retained WBA and The Ring light welterweight titles
120	Win	103–2–14 (1)	Antonio Ortiz	PTS	10	Nov 13, 1971	Estadio Luna Park, Buenos Aires, Argentina	
119	Win	102–2–14 (1)	Angel Roman	PTS	10	Oct 29, 1971	Salta, Argentina	
118	Win	101–2–14 (1)	Domingo Barrera	SD	15	Apr 3, 1971	Estadio Luna Park, Buenos Aires, Argentina	Retained WBA and The Ring light welterweight titles
117	Win	100–2–14 (1)	Adan Gomez	PTS	10	Mar 10, 1971	La Falda, Argentina	
116	Win	99–2–14 (1)	Juan Carlos Peralta	PTS	10	Feb 14, 1971	San Miguel de Tucumán, Argentina	
115	Win	98–2–14 (1)	Adolph Pruitt	UD	15	May 16, 1970	Estadio Luna Park, Buenos Aires, Argentina	Retained WBA and The Ring light welterweight titles
114	Win	97–2–14 (1)	Marcelino Acevedo	TKO	9 (10)	Apr 18, 1970	Club Ramon Santamarina, Tandil, Argentina	
113	Win	96–2–14 (1)	Martin Oscar Juarez	PTS	10	Apr 3, 1970	Rosario, Argentina	
112	Win	95–2–14 (1)	João Henrique	UD	15	Oct 11, 1969	Estadio Luna Park, Buenos Aires, Argentina	Retained WBA and The Ring light welterweight titles
111	Win	94–2–14 (1)	Angel Roman	PTS	10	Aug 22, 1969	Cordoba, Argentina	
110	Win	93–2–14 (1)	German Gastelbondo	UD	10	Aug 2, 1969	Estadio Luna Park, Buenos Aires, Argentina	
109	Win	92–2–14 (1)	Carlos Hernández	UD	15	May 3, 1969	Estadio Luna Park, Buenos Aires, Argentina	Retained WBA and The Ring light welterweight titles
108	Win	91–2–14 (1)	Manuel Hernandez	UD	10	Apr 3, 1969	Federación Mendocina de Box, Ciudad Mendoza, Argentina	
107	Win	90–2–14 (1)	Takeshi Fuji	RTD	10 (15), 0:03	Dec 12, 1968	Kuramae Kokugikan, Tokyo, Japan	Won WBA and The Ring light welterweight titles
106	Draw	89–2–14 (1)	Anibal Di Lella	PTS	8	Oct 12, 1968	Mar del Plata, Argentina	
105	Win	89–2–13 (1)	Orlando Ribeiro	PTS	10	Sep 13, 1968	Federación Mendocina de Box, Ciudad Mendoza, Argentina	
104	Win	88–2–13 (1)	Hilario Suarez	PTS	10	Aug 16, 1968	San Francisco, Argentina	
103	Win	87–2–13 (1)	Tito Del Barco	PTS	10	Aug 2, 1968	Cordoba, Argentina	
102	Win	86–2–13 (1)	Juan Alberto Aranda	PTS	10	Jul 12, 1968	Federación Mendocina de Box, Ciudad Mendoza, Argentina	
101	Win	85–2–13 (1)	Abel Cachazu	PTS	10	Jun 8, 1968	Estadio Luna Park, Buenos Aires, Argentina	
100	Win	84–2–13 (1)	Alfredo Urbina	PTS	10	May 11, 1968	Buenos Aires, Argentina	
99	Win	83–2–13 (1)	Juan Carlos Gomez	PTS	10	Apr 20, 1968	Mar del Plata, Argentina	
98	Win	82–2–13 (1)	Alfredo Urbina	PTS	10	Apr 10, 1968	Buenos Aires, Argentina	
97	Win	81–2–13 (1)	Vicente Milan Derado	TKO	6 (10)	Dec 2, 1967	Buenos Aires, Argentina	
96	Win	80–2–13 (1)	Adan Gomez	UD	10	Nov 24, 1967	San Juan, Argentina	
95	Win	79–2–13 (1)	Abel Cachazu	PTS	10	Nov 8, 1967	Federación Mendocina de Box, Ciudad Mendoza, Argentina	
94	Win	78–2–13 (1)	Leonardo Peralta	PTS	10	Oct 18, 1967	San Rafael, Argentina	
93	Win	77–2–13 (1)	Abel Cachazu	PTS	10	Oct 4, 1967	Estadio Luna Park, Buenos Aires, Argentina	
92	Win	76–2–13 (1)	Osvaldo Piazza	UD	10	Sep 15, 1967	Cordoba Sport Club, Cordoba, Argentina	
91	Win	75–2–13 (1)	Ramon Adolfo Gomez	TKO	10 (10)	Sep 10, 1967	Bahia Blanca, Argentina	
90	Win	74–2–13 (1)	Eddie Perkins	PTS	10	Aug 19, 1967	Estadio Luna Park, Buenos Aires, Argentina	
89	Win	73–2–13 (1)	Osvaldo Piazza	PTS	10	Aug 4, 1967	Cipolletti, Argentina	
88	Win	72–2–13 (1)	Carlos Clemente	PTS	10	Jul 19, 1967	Tandil, Argentina	
87	Win	71–2–13 (1)	Jose Acha Paz	TKO	6 (10)	Jul 10, 1967	Federación Mendocina de Box, Ciudad Mendoza, Argentina	
86	Win	70–2–13 (1)	Adan Gomez	PTS	10	Jun 2, 1967	Bahia Blanca, Argentina	
85	Win	69–2–13 (1)	Langston Morgan	PTS	10	May 13, 1967	Estadio Luna Park, Buenos Aires, Argentina	
84	Win	68–2–13 (1)	Ruben Loayza	PTS	10	Apr 21, 1967	Federación Mendocina de Box, Ciudad Mendoza, Argentina	
83	Win	67–2–13 (1)	Ubaldino Escobar	PTS	10	Apr 7, 1967	Federación Mendocina de Box, Ciudad Mendoza, Argentina	
82	Win	66–2–13 (1)	Everaldo Costa Azevedo	PTS	10	Jan 13, 1967	Federación Mendocina de Box, Ciudad Mendoza, Argentina	
81	Win	65–2–13 (1)	Jose Omar Salvo	PTS	10	Dec 30, 1966	Federación Mendocina de Box, Ciudad Mendoza, Argentina	
80	Win	64–2–13 (1)	Omar Gottifredi	UD	10	Oct 7, 1966	Federación Mendocina de Box, Ciudad Mendoza, Argentina	
79	Win	63–2–13 (1)	Sandro Lopopolo	UD	10	Sep 10, 1966	Estadio Luna Park, Buenos Aires, Argentina	
78	Win	62–2–13 (1)	Jose Omar Salvo	PTS	10	Aug 19, 1966	Río Gallegos, Argentina	
77	Draw	61–2–13 (1)	Carlos Ortiz	MD	10	Apr 7, 1966	Estadio Luna Park, Buenos Aires, Argentina	
76	Win	61–2–12 (1)	Omar Gottifredi	PTS	10	Jan 22, 1966	Federación Mendocina de Box, Ciudad Mendoza, Argentina	
75	Win	60–2–12 (1)	Hugo Rambaldi	PTS	12	Dec 18, 1965	Estadio Luna Park, Buenos Aires, Argentina	Won Argentine lightweight title
74	Win	59–2–12 (1)	Raul Santos Villalba	PTS	10	Sep 17, 1965	Federación Mendocina de Box, Ciudad Mendoza, Argentina	
73	Win	58–2–12 (1)	Leonardo Peralta	PTS	10	Aug 6, 1965	Resistencia, Argentina	
72	Draw	57–2–12 (1)	Ismael Laguna	PTS	10	Jul 17, 1965	Estadio Luna Park, Buenos Aires, Argentina	
71	Win	57–2–11 (1)	Juan Carlos Salinas	TKO	8 (10)	Apr 30, 1965	Rio Cuarto, Argentina	
70	Win	56–2–11 (1)	Abel Laudonio	PTS	12	Apr 10, 1965	Estadio Luna Park, Buenos Aires, Argentina	Retained South American lightweight title
69	Win	55–2–11 (1)	Hugo Rambaldi	PTS	10	Mar 20, 1965	Estadio Luna Park, Buenos Aires, Argentina	
68	Win	54–2–11 (1)	Adan Gomez	PTS	10	Jan 26, 1965	Santa Fe, Argentina	
67	Win	53–2–11 (1)	Pedro Benelli	PTS	10	Dec 23, 1964	Cordoba Sport Club, Cordoba, Argentina	
66	Loss	52–2–11 (1)	Abel Laudonio	PTS	12	Nov 14, 1964	Estadio Luna Park, Buenos Aires, Argentina	Lost Argentine lightweight title
65	Win	52–1–11 (1)	Humberto Barbatto	PTS	10	Oct 9, 1964	Bahia Blanca, Argentina	
64	Draw	51–1–11 (1)	Gualberto Gutiérrez	PTS	10	Sep 26, 1964	Montevideo, Uruguay	
63	Win	51–1–10 (1)	Roberto Palavecino	PTS	10	Sep 4, 1964	Federación Mendocina de Box, Ciudad Mendoza, Argentina	
62	Win	50–1–10 (1)	Deolidio Sosa	PTS	10	Aug 21, 1964	Rosario, Argentina	
61	Win	49–1–10 (1)	Abel Laudonio	PTS	10	Aug 8, 1964	Estadio Luna Park, Buenos Aires, Argentina	
60	Win	48–1–10 (1)	Carlos Clemente	PTS	10	Jul 10, 1964	Federación Mendocina de Box, Ciudad Mendoza, Argentina	
59	Win	47–1–10 (1)	Carlos Cappella	PTS	10	Jun 19, 1964	Federación Mendocina de Box, Ciudad Mendoza, Argentina	
58	Win	46–1–10 (1)	Roberto Palavecino	PTS	10	Apr 18, 1964	Estadio Luna Park, Buenos Aires, Argentina	
57	Win	45–1–10 (1)	Raul Santos Villalba	PTS	10	Feb 28, 1964	Mar del Plata, Argentina	
56	Draw	44–1–10 (1)	Roberto Palavecino	PTS	10	Feb 14, 1964	Mar del Plata, Argentina	
55	Win	44–1–9 (1)	Pedro Benelli	PTS	10	Jan 31, 1964	San Miguel de Tucumán, Argentina	
54	Win	43–1–9 (1)	Raul Santos Villalba	PTS	10	Dec 14, 1963	Buenos Aires, Argentina	
53	Draw	42–1–9 (1)	Tristán Falfán	PTS	10	Oct 11, 1963	Cordoba, Argentina	
52	Draw	42–1–8 (1)	Carlos Cappella	PTS	10	Sep 27, 1963	San Miguel de Tucumán, Argentina	
51	Win	42–1–7 (1)	Adan Gomez	PTS	10	Sep 13, 1963	Federación Mendocina de Box, Ciudad Mendoza, Argentina	
50	Win	41–1–7 (1)	Joe Brown	UD	10	Aug 10, 1963	Estadio Luna Park, Buenos Aires, Argentina	
49	Win	40–1–7 (1)	Rodolfo Espinoza	PTS	10	Jul 20, 1963	Mar del Plata, Argentina	
48	Win	39–1–7 (1)	Sebastiao Nascimento	PTS	15	Jun 29, 1963	Federación Mendocina de Box, Ciudad Mendoza, Argentina	Won South American lightweight title
47	Win	38–1–7 (1)	Eulogio Caballero	PTS	10	Jun 8, 1963	Federación Mendocina de Box, Ciudad Mendoza, Argentina	
46	Win	37–1–7 (1)	Gregorio Cintas	PTS	10	May 24, 1963	Federación Mendocina de Box, Ciudad Mendoza, Argentina	
45	Win	36–1–7 (1)	Rodolfo Catalini	PTS	10	Apr 26, 1963	Federación Mendocina de Box, Ciudad Mendoza, Argentina	
44	Win	35–1–7 (1)	Javier Gomez	PTS	10	Mar 23, 1963	Buenos Aires, Argentina	
43	Draw	34–1–7 (1)	Gregorio Cintas	PTS	10	Feb 22, 1963	Salta, Argentina	
42	Win	34–1–6 (1)	Pedro Benelli	PTS	10	Feb 1, 1963	Federación Mendocina de Box, Ciudad Mendoza, Argentina	
41	Win	33–1–6 (1)	Tony Padron	PTS	10	Dec 28, 1962	Federación Mendocina de Box, Ciudad Mendoza, Argentina	
40	Win	32–1–6 (1)	Tristan Falfan	KO	6 (10)	Dec 14, 1962	Cordoba, Argentina	
39	Win	31–1–6 (1)	Manuel Alvarez	PTS	12	Oct 20, 1962	Buenos Aires, Argentina	Retained Argentine lightweight title
38	Win	30–1–6 (1)	Pedro Benelli	PTS	10	Sep 29, 1962	Estadio Luna Park, Buenos Aires, Argentina	
37	Win	29–1–6 (1)	Hugo Juarez	PTS	10	Aug 24, 1962	Federación Mendocina de Box, Ciudad Mendoza, Argentina	
36	Win	28–1–6 (1)	Humberto Barbatto	PTS	10	Jul 6, 1962	Federación Mendocina de Box, Ciudad Mendoza, Argentina	
35	Win	27–1–6 (1)	Eulogio Caballero	PTS	10	Jun 5, 1962	Federación Mendocina de Box, Ciudad Mendoza, Argentina	
34	Win	26–1–6 (1)	Horacio Rivero	TKO	2 (10)	May 16, 1962	Federación Mendocina de Box, Ciudad Mendoza, Argentina	
33	Win	25–1–6 (1)	Abelardo Sire	PTS	10	Apr 24, 1962	Federación Mendocina de Box, Ciudad Mendoza, Argentina	
32	Win	24–1–6 (1)	Fernando Azocar	PTS	10	Mar 30, 1962	Federación Mendocina de Box, Ciudad Mendoza, Argentina	
31	Win	23–1–6 (1)	Nuncio Canistra	TKO	9 (10)	Jan 25, 1962	Palmira, Argentina	
30	Win	22–1–6 (1)	Vicente Milan Derado	PTS	10	Dec 16, 1961	Estadio Luna Park, Buenos Aires, Argentina	
29	Win	21–1–6 (1)	Pedro Benelli	PTS	10	Dec 1, 1961	Federación Mendocina de Box, Ciudad Mendoza, Argentina	
28	Win	20–1–6 (1)	Jaime Gine	PTS	12	Nov 4, 1961	Estadio Luna Park, Buenos Aires, Argentina	Won Argentine lightweight title
27	Win	19–1–6 (1)	Ubaldino Escobar	PTS	10	Oct 13, 1961	Federación Mendocina de Box, Ciudad Mendoza, Argentina	
26	Win	18–1–6 (1)	Ubaldino Escobar	PTS	10	Sep 29, 1961	Federación Mendocina de Box, Ciudad Mendoza, Argentina	
25	Win	17–1–6 (1)	Juan Carlos Flores	KO	5 (10)	Sep 1, 1961	Federación Mendocina de Box, Ciudad Mendoza, Argentina	
24	Win	16–1–6 (1)	Guillermo Cano	PTS	12	Jun 9, 1961	Federación Mendocina de Box, Ciudad Mendoza, Argentina	
23	Win	15–1–6 (1)	Julio H. Catalini	TKO	10 (10)	May 12, 1961	Federación Mendocina de Box, Ciudad Mendoza, Argentina	
22	Win	14–1–6 (1)	Antonio Repollo	PTS	10	Mar 10, 1961	Federación Mendocina de Box, Ciudad Mendoza, Argentina	
21	Draw	13–1–6 (1)	Juan Ignacio Campos	PTS	10	Jan 27, 1961	Córdoba, Argentina	
20	Win	13–1–5 (1)	Vicente Milan Derado	UD	10	Jan 20, 1961	Federación Mendocina de Box, Ciudad Mendoza, Argentina	
19	Win	12–1–5 (1)	Rogelio Andre	PTS	10	Nov 4, 1960	Federación Mendocina de Box, Ciudad Mendoza, Argentina	
18	Draw	11–1–5 (1)	Manuel Alvarez	PTS	10	Sep 17, 1960	Estadio Luna Park, Buenos Aires, Argentina	
17	Win	11–1–4 (1)	Pedro Benelli	PTS	10	Jul 30, 1960	Estadio Luna Park, Buenos Aires, Argentina	
16	Draw	10–1–4 (1)	Jaime Gine	PTS	10	Jun 11, 1960	Estadio Luna Park, Buenos Aires, Argentina	
15	Win	10–1–3 (1)	Juan Ignacio Campos	PTS	10	Mar 25, 1960	Federación Mendocina de Box, Ciudad Mendoza, Argentina	
14	Win	9–1–3 (1)	Jaime Gine	PTS	10	Feb 26, 1960	Federación Mendocina de Box, Ciudad Mendoza, Argentina	
13	Draw	8–1–3 (1)	Vicente Milan Derado	PTS	10	Jan 22, 1960	Federación Mendocina de Box, Ciudad Mendoza, Argentina	
12	Win	8–1–2 (1)	Hector Tula	TKO	5 (10)	Jan 8, 1960	Federación Mendocina de Box, Ciudad Mendoza, Argentina	
11	Draw	7–1–2 (1)	Ricardo Jofre	PTS	10	Dec 11, 1959	Federación Mendocina de Box, Ciudad Mendoza, Argentina	
10	Loss	7–1–1 (1)	Vicente Milan Derado	PTS	10	Nov 6, 1959	Federación Mendocina de Box, Ciudad Mendoza, Argentina	
9	Draw	7–0–1 (1)	Juan Ignacio Campos	PTS	10	Oct 16, 1959	Federación Mendocina de Box, Ciudad Mendoza, Argentina	
8	Win	7–0 (1)	Pedro Videla	PTS	8	Aug 8, 1959	Estadio Luna Park, Buenos Aires, Argentina	
7	Win	6–0 (1)	Juan Ramirez	PTS	8	Jul 29, 1959	Estadio Luna Park, Buenos Aires, Argentina	
6	Win	5–0 (1)	Leandro Ahumada	PTS	10	Apr 3, 1959	Federación Mendocina de Box, Ciudad Mendoza, Argentina	
5	Win	4–0 (1)	Rodolfo Catalini	KO	4 (10)	Mar 6, 1959	Federación Mendocina de Box, Ciudad Mendoza, Argentina	
4	NC	3–0 (1)	Leandro Ahumada	NC	9 (10)	Feb 27, 1959	Federación Mendocina de Box, Ciudad Mendoza, Argentina	
3	Win	3–0	Eduardo Salazar	PTS	10	Jan 30, 1959	Federación Mendocina de Box, Ciudad Mendoza, Argentina	
2	Win	2–0	Rodolfo Catalini	PTS	8	Jan 9, 1959	Federación Mendocina de Box, Ciudad Mendoza, Argentina	
1	Win	1–0	Luis Garcia	KO	2 (6)	Dec 11, 1958	Federación Mendocina de Box, Ciudad Mendoza, Argentina	

== Death ==
Locche died in Las Heras in 2005 of heart failure.

== See also ==
- Lineal championship
- List of world light-welterweight boxing champions

Sporting positions
Regional boxing titles
Preceded by Jaime Gine	Argentine lightweight Champion; November 4, 1961 – November 14, 1964	Succeeded by Abel Laudonio
Preceded by Sebastião Nascimento	South American lightweight Champion; June 29, 1963 – July, 1966; Vacated	Vacant Title next held by Hugo Rambaldi
Vacant Title last held by Abel Laudonio	Argentine lightweight Champion; December 18, 1965 – July, 1966; Vacated	Succeeded by Hugo Rambaldi; Awarded title
World boxing titles
Preceded by Takeshi Fuji	WBA light welterweight champion December 12, 1968 – March 10, 1972	Succeeded by Alfonso Frazer
Preceded by Takeshi Fuji	The Ring light welterweight champion December 12, 1968 – March 10, 1972	Succeeded by Alfonso Frazer
Awards
Previous: Roberto De Vicenzo	Olimpia de Oro; 1968	Next: Alberto Demiddi
