= Sunrise Musical Theater =

Defunct American arts venue in Florida

Coordinates: 26.1911°N 80.2808°W

- Interactive map of Sunrise Musical Theater
- Address: 5555 NW 95th Avenue; Sunrise, Florida; United States
- Capacity: 3,732

Construction
- Opened: December 29, 1976
- Closed: 2002

Sunrise Musical Theater was a performing arts center located in Sunrise, Florida. It opened in 1976 hosting concerts and processions. The seating capacity of the theater was 3,732. The theater had an "unofficial" opening on December 27, 1976. The first event was a performance of the play "Pinocchio" featuring part of the cast of the Kay Rockefeller Children's Theater in New York. Bobby Vinton officially opened the theater on December 29, 1976. Notable past performers include Air Supply, Tori Amos, Frank Sinatra, The Police, Diana Ross, Liberace, Liza Minnelli, Sir Tom Jones, Tears for Fears, Eartha Kitt, Engelbert Humperdinck, Barry Manilow, Elton John, Sheena Easton, The Beach Boys, Frank Zappa, Bob Dylan, The Kinks, Lou Reed, The Smithereens, Cheap Trick, James Taylor, Carole King, Chicago, The Jacksons, the Allman Brothers, King Crimson, Molly Hatchet, Sharon, Lois & Bram, Phish, Beastie Boys, Stevie Ray Vaughan, The Outlaws, Simply Red, Olivia Newton-John, Ozzy Osbourne with Randy Rhoads twice and Black Sabbath, Pantera, Iron Maiden, The Dave Matthews Band, and Eagles. In 2002 Faith Center Ministries made the facility their home of worship.

== Boxing fights ==
The Sunrise Musical Theater also became a footnote in professional boxing's history when, on August 8, 1987, a boxing show was hosted by the theater. In it, International Boxing Hall of Fame member and former two time world Junior Welterweight champion Aaron Pryor suffered his only career loss as a professional fighter, being knocked out in seven rounds by Bobby Joe Young. Future IBF world Cruiserweight champion Uriah Grant also fought at the theater that night.
