= Lew Powell =

Lew Powell is an American journalist, author, and newspaper editor. He began his career by founding and editing the independent liberal monthly newspaper Mississippi Freelance. He reported and edited for The Charlotte Observer for thirty-four years and has written several books about North Carolina.

== Early life ==
Powell was born in Helena, Arkansas, and grew up in Mississippi in a farming family. He attended the University of Mississippi and majored in accounting before choosing a career in journalism.

== Career ==
After graduating, Powell became a sportswriter at the Jacksonville Journal, and then a journalist for the Delta Democrat-Times in Greenville, Mississippi. In 1969 he co-founded the liberal monthly newspaper Mississippi Freelance with his Delta Democrat-Times colleague Ed Williams.

The name of the newspaper was chosen to parody an old newspaper, the Mississippi Free Lance, which had been published by former Mississippi governor and U.S. Senator Theodore G. Bilbo, an ardent white supremacist. The Freelance criticized racism and ineptitude in Mississippi politicians, universities, and particularly the state's Mississippi State Sovereignty Commission. The newspaper's motto was "reporting the unreported." The paper's Washington bureau chief was journalist and historian Curtis Wilkie. Mississippi Freelance was published from April 1969 to March 1970.

Powell was hired as a feature writer at The Charlotte Observer in 1974 and remained at the newspaper until his retirement 35 years later. At the Charlotte Observer, Powell was known for his profiles of people, his annual “Carolina Follies,” an end-of-year collection of the absurd, his quizzes about North Carolina, his Milestones, and his 20 Questions. He retired as the paper’s Forum editor, having reviewed and published more than 50,000 letters to the newspaper. Powell retired from the Charlotte Observer in April 2009.

His work as a journalist at the Observer and his time in Charlotte led to a passion for the history and culture of North Carolina. In a newspaper article, Powell cites a particular interest in the conflicts between liberal ideology in Charlotte and conservative forces elsewhere in the state. Powell has published several books about North Carolina, with a focus on lesser-known and off-beat information about the state. His books include On This Day in North Carolina, which shares obscure facts about each day in the state’s history, The Ultimate North Carolina Quiz Book, and Lew Powell's Carolina Follies: A Nose-Tweaking Look at Life in Two Great and Goofy States. In 2011, he was interviewed in a documentary about Camp Greene, a World War I United States Army facility in Charlotte, North Carolina. He is a regular contributor to the blog North Carolina Miscellany, a project of the University of North Carolina’s North Carolina Collection.

== Personal life ==
Powell lives in Charlotte, North Carolina with his wife, poet, author, and journalist Dannye Romine Powell.

In a 2012 newspaper article about his hobby of collecting North Carolina artifacts and documenting North Carolina history, Powell is quoted as saying, "I simply love discovering things otherwise not well known. North Carolina is unique because we have our own quirky culture and history, and I love to share that with people."

Powell’s hobby of collecting pin-back buttons resulted in a significant collection of items, which he donated to the North Carolina Collection in the Wilson Special Collections Library at the University of North Carolina at Chapel Hill. In 2007 he donated 2,698 pin-back buttons, badges, ribbons, cloth swatches, promotional cards, and stickers related to politics in North Carolina. Additional donated items include regional travel souvenirs, protest movements, musical ephemera such as concert posters and tickets, advertisements for North Carolina products, and materials related to college and professional athletic teams.

== Works ==
- Powell, Lew (1990). Lew Powell's Carolina Follies: A Nose-Tweaking Look at Life in Two Great and Goofy States. Down Home Press. ISBN 978-0962425516.
- Powell, Lew (1996). On This Day in North Carolina. John F Blair Pub. ISBN 978-0895871398.
- Powell, Lew (1999). The Ultimate North Carolina Quiz Book. The University of North Carolina Press. ISBN 978-0807848258.
