= Aaron Pryor =

American boxer (1955–2016)

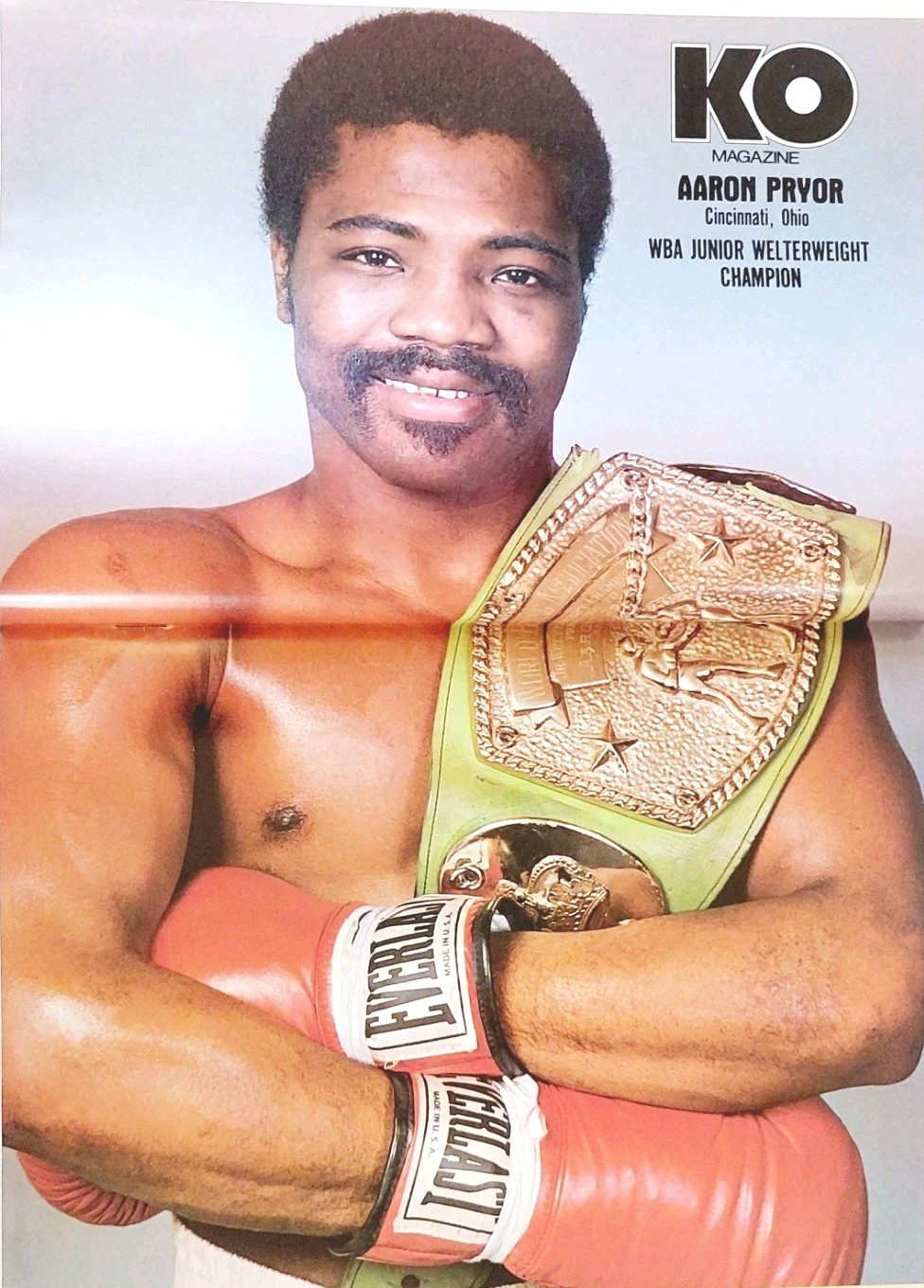
- Pryor c. 1982

Personal information
- Nickname: The Hawk
- Born: October 20, 1955 Cincinnati, Ohio, U.S.
- Died: October 9, 2016 (aged 60) Cincinnati, Ohio, U.S.
- Height: 5 ft 6 in (168 cm)
- Weight: Light welterweight

Boxing career
- Reach: 69 in (175 cm)
- Stance: Orthodox

Boxing record
- Total fights: 40
- Wins: 39
- Win by KO: 35
- Losses: 1
Medal record
Men's amateur boxing
Representing United States
Pan American Games
Silver medal – second place	1975 Mexico City	Lightweight

Aaron Pryor (October 20, 1955 – October 9, 2016) was an American professional boxer who competed from 1976 to 1990. He was a two-time light welterweight world champion, having held the WBA title from 1980 to 1983, and the IBF title from 1984 to 1985. Additionally, he held the Ring magazine title from 1980 to 1983, and the lineal title from 1983 to 1986.

In 1982, the Boxing Writers Association of America named Pryor as their Fighter of the Year. Pryor was inducted into the International Boxing Hall of Fame in 1996, and in 1999 was voted by the Associated Press as the world's best light welterweight of the 20th century. In 2002, he was ranked as the 35th greatest boxer of the past 80 years by The Ring.

== Amateur career ==
Pryor, nicknamed The Hawk, had a record of 204 wins and 16 losses as an amateur. He won the National Amateur Athletic Union (AAU) Lightweight Championship in 1973. In 1975, he again won the National AAU Lightweight Championship and a silver medal at the Pan American Games, losing in the final to Canadian Chris Clarke.

Pryor beat future champion Thomas Hearns in the lightweight finals of the 1976 National Golden Gloves, but lost to Howard Davis Jr. controversially at the 1976 Olympic Trials. Pryor participated as an alternate in the 1976 Summer Olympics in Montreal.

As an amateur, Pryor holds also a unique achievement: at the 1974 USSR vs USA boxing duals he defeated three future world champions: Vassily Solomin, Valery Lvov and Valery Rachkov.

Pryor finished his amateur career having 220 fights under his belt, with a record of 204 wins, 16 losses.

== Professional career ==
Pryor turned professional on November 11, 1976, with a second-round knockout of Larry Smith, for which he made $400. A few days later, Pryor signed a managerial contract with Buddy LaRosa, owner of LaRosa's Pizzeria. He was also trained by Raymond Cartier.

Pryor fought eight times in 1977, winning all but two by knockout. The only two fighters who lasted the entire fight with Pryor that year were Jose Resto and Johnny Summerhayes, each losing by an eight-round unanimous decision. After the fight with Summerhayes, Pryor won 26 fights in a row by knockout. It was one of the longest knockout streaks in the history of boxing.

In his last fight of 1979, Pryor was pitted for the first time ever in his professional career against a former or future world champion when he faced former WBA light welterweight champion Alfonso "Peppermint" Frazer of Panama. Pryor knocked out Frazer in the fifth round, advancing his fight record to 20–0 with 18 knockouts. After defeating Fraser, Pryor entered the World Boxing Association rankings.

On August 2, 1980, Pryor faced two-time world champion Antonio Cervantes of Colombia for the WBA light-welterweight championship. His purse was $50,000. The fight took place in Pryor's hometown of Cincinnati and was nationally televised by the CBS network. Pryor was knocked down in round one, but he rose and knocked out Cervantes in round four to become champion. He made his first title defense on November 22, 1980, knocking out Gaetan Hart in the sixth round. Pryor made $100,000 for the fight.

In December 1980, Pryor rejected an offer of $500,000 to fight Sugar Ray Leonard for the WBC welterweight championship because he wanted more money. When the WBC raised the offer to $750,000, he rejected that as well. Pryor signed to fight WBC light-welterweight champion Saoul Mamby in a unification bout for $1 million. The bout was tentatively scheduled for February 7, 1981. However, the fight fell apart when the promoter, Harold Smith, disappeared amid allegations that he was involved in a $21.3 million fraud against Wells Fargo National Bank. Smith, whose real name was Ross Fields, was later sentenced to ten years in prison after he was convicted of 29 counts of fraud and embezzlement.

Pryor was then offered $750,000 to fight Roberto Durán in April 1981, but Pryor turned it down because his new attorney told him not to sign anything until he worked out a new contract with manager Buddy LaRosa. By the time they worked out a new agreement, the chance to fight Durán was gone.

On June 27, 1981, Pryor knocked out Lennox Blackmoore in the second round. He then defended the title against undefeated Dujuan Johnson on November 14, 1981. Johnson knocked down Pryor in round one, but Pryor came back to stop Johnson in the seventh round.

Pryor knocked out Miguel Montilla in the twelfth round on March 21, 1982. His next title defense was against the undefeated Akio Kameda of Japan. The fight took place on July 4, 1982. Once again, Pryor was knocked down in the first round but came back to score a sixth-round knockout.

Pryor signed to face Sugar Ray Leonard for the undisputed welterweight championship in the fall of 1982 for $750,000. But before fighting Pryor, Leonard first had to defend his title against Roger Stafford in Buffalo, New York, on May 14, 1982. The Sunday before that bout, Pryor was driving to Buffalo from his Cincinnati home to taunt Leonard and hype their planned bout. Pryor heard on his car radio the news that Leonard had sustained a detached retina in his left eye and the fight was off. "I pulled off to the side of the road and I cried," Pryor said. Leonard retired six months later.

=== Bouts with Alexis Arguello ===
On November 12, 1982, Pryor defended his title with a fourteenth-round TKO of Alexis Arguello before a crowd of 23,800 at Miami's Orange Bowl and a live HBO audience. The fight dubbed The Battle of The Champions by promoter Bob Arum, was eventually named the Fight of the Decade by The Ring.

Pryor made $1.6 million while Arguello was paid $1.5 million. Arguello, a 12-5 favorite, was attempting to become the first boxer to win world titles in four weight divisions.

The end of the fight was controversial. Arguello landed a punch in the thirteenth round that seemed to stun Pryor, and despite trailing on two of three scorecards, Arguello had things tilting in his direction. Between the thirteenth and fourteenth rounds, HBO's microphones caught Pryor's trainer, Panama Lewis, telling cutman Artie Curley, "Give me the other bottle, the one I mixed."

It seemed to revive Pryor. Coming out quickly for the fourteenth round, Pryor landed a barrage of unanswered blows before referee Stanley Christodoulou stopped it. Arguello collapsed to the canvas near the ropes, where he lay for several minutes.

On April 2, 1983, Pryor knocked out former WBC super lightweight champion Sang-Hyun Kim in the third round.

Pryor had a rematch with Arguello at Caesars Palace in Las Vegas, Nevada, on September 9, 1983. Pryor made a career-high $2.25 million and Arguello made $1.75 million.

Panama Lewis had his license revoked after he removed the padding from the gloves of Luis Resto before his fight with Billy Collins Jr. on June 16, 1983. Pryor hired Richie Giachetti to train him, but they had a falling-out. Two weeks before the Arguello rematch, Pryor brought in Emanuel Steward as his trainer.

The rematch was not as competitive as their first one. Pryor was badly staggered towards the end of round two by an Arguello uppercut, but he dropped Arguello with a right cross in the first round and again with a left hook in the fourth. Pryor put Arguello down for the count in the tenth round.

After the fight, both Arguello and Pryor announced that they were retiring from boxing.

=== Short-lived retirement and return ===
Pryor's retirement didn't last very long. In March 1984, he announced that he was going to fight again. "I never really retired. I just rested," Pryor said. "I vacated the title because the WBA insisted I defend it every six months." The newly formed IBF immediately recognized him as their world champion.

Shortly before Pryor made his comeback, his proposed multimillion-dollar fight with WBA lightweight champion Ray Mancini fell through when Mancini was knocked out by Livingstone Bramble on June 1, 1984. "Aaron Pryor actually cried," Said Bob Arum. "I saw the tears."

On June 22, 1984, Pryor defended his IBF title against Nick Furlano in Toronto, Ontario, Canada. Pryor knocked down Furlano twice in the first round but was unable to finish him. Pryor won by a lopsided fifteen-round unanimous decision. Furlano became the first boxer in 27 fights to last the entire fight with Pryor.

Pryor defended his title against future IBF light-welterweight champion Gary Hinton on March 2, 1985. Pryor won by a fifteen-round split decision. He got off to a sluggish start but came on strong in the second half, winning five of the last seven rounds on the cards of judges Frank Cairo (who voted for Hinton) and Phil Newman and all seven on the card of judge Lawrence Wallace. Pryor dropped Hinton early in the 14th round with a right to the chin.

=== Drug abuse and comeback ===
By the mid-1980s, Pryor's life had become consumed by drugs. In December 1985, Pryor was stripped of the IBF title for failure to defend. "

After 29 months out of the ring, Pryor, insisting he was now clean from drugs, attempted a comeback. He fought welterweight journeyman Bobby Joe Young in Fort Lauderdale, Florida, on August 8, 1987. Pryor was a shell of his former self and was knocked out in the seventh round.

On December 15, 1988, Pryor scored a third-round knockout of club fighter Hermino Morales in Rochester, New York.

In April 1990, Pryor was ordered to undergo two years of treatment for drug abuse. Pryor entered a no-contest plea to a charge of possessing illegal drug paraphernalia, a pipe used for smoking cocaine, which was found in his car after he was stopped by the police in Cincinnati in September 1989.

Pryor next fought Darryl Jones on May 16, 1990, in Madison, Wisconsin. Jones, who had a record of 13-13, was knocked out in the third round.

Before the Jones fight, Pryor had surgery to remove a cataract and repair a detached retina. After the surgery, Pryor was denied a license to fight by the states of California, New York and Nevada. The Nevada state medical report declared Pryor to be legally blind in his left eye. His vision in his left eye was 20/400. With corrective lenses, the vision improved to 20/70. The State of Wisconsin gave him a license after he agreed to sign a waiver releasing the state from liability for any damage he may suffer in the fight.

Pryor's last fight was on December 4, 1990, in Norman, Oklahoma. He knocked out unheralded Roger Choate in the seventh round. Pryor's career ended with a record of 39–1 with 35 knockouts.

Pryor finally kicked his drug habit in 1993 and remained drug free until his death in 2016.

Pryor was inducted into the International Boxing Hall Of Fame in 1996.

Aaron "The Hawk" Pryor was voted as the Greatest Light Welterweight in boxing history by the Houston Boxing Hall Of Fame in 2014. The HBHOF is a voting body composed entirely of current and former fighters.

== Professional boxing record ==
40 fights	39 wins	1 loss
By knockout	35	1
By decision	4	0

No.	Result	Record	Opponent	Type	Round, time	Date	Location	Notes
40	Win	39–1	Roger Choate	TKO	7 (10), 1:44	Dec 4, 1990	Sheraton Hotel, Norman, Oklahoma, U.S.	
39	Win	38–1	Darryl Jones	KO	3, 1:15	May 16, 1990	Masonic Temple, Madison, Wisconsin, U.S.	
38	Win	37–1	Herminio Morales	KO	3 (10), 1:32	Dec 15, 1988	Community War Memorial, Rochester, New York, U.S.	
37	Loss	36–1	Bobby Joe Young	TKO	7 (10), 0:29	Aug 8, 1987	Sunrise Musical Theater, Fort Lauderdale, Florida, U.S.	
36	Win	36–0	Gary Hinton	SD	15	Mar 2, 1985	Sands, Atlantic City, New Jersey, U.S.	Retained IBF light welterweight title
35	Win	35–0	Nick Furlano	UD	15	Jun 22, 1984	Varsity Stadium, Toronto, Ontario, Canada	Won inaugural IBF light welterweight title
34	Win	34–0	Alexis Argüello	KO	10 (15), 1:48	Sep 9, 1983	Caesars Palace, Paradise, Nevada, U.S.	Retained WBA and The Ring light welterweight titles
33	Win	33–0	Kim Sang-hyun	TKO	3 (15), 0:37	Apr 2, 1983	Sands, Atlantic City, New Jersey, U.S.	Retained WBA and The Ring light welterweight titles
32	Win	32–0	Alexis Argüello	TKO	14 (15), 1:06	Nov 12, 1982	Orange Bowl, Miami, Florida, U.S.	Retained WBA and The Ring light welterweight titles
31	Win	31–0	Akio Kameda	TKO	6 (15), 1:44	Jul 4, 1982	Riverfront Coliseum, Cincinnati, Ohio, U.S.	Retained WBA and The Ring light welterweight titles
30	Win	30–0	Miguel Montilla	TKO	12 (15), 0:42	Mar 21, 1982	Playboy Hotel and Casino, Atlantic City, New Jersey, U.S.	Retained WBA and The Ring light welterweight titles
29	Win	29–0	Dujuan Johnson	TKO	7 (15), 1:49	Nov 14, 1981	Public Hall, Cleveland, Ohio, U.S.	Retained WBA and The Ring light welterweight titles
28	Win	28–0	Lennox Blackmoore	TKO	2 (15), 0:58	Jun 27, 1981	Hacienda, Paradise, Nevada, U.S.	Retained WBA and The Ring light welterweight titles
27	Win	27–0	Gaétan Hart	TKO	6 (15), 2:09	Nov 22, 1980	Riverfront Coliseum, Cincinnati, Ohio, U.S.	Retained WBA and The Ring light welterweight titles
26	Win	26–0	Danny Myers	TKO	3 (10), 0:57	Nov 1, 1980	Hara Arena, Dayton, Ohio, U.S.	
25	Win	25–0	Antonio Cervantes	KO	4 (15), 1:47	Aug 2, 1980	Riverfront Coliseum, Cincinnati, Ohio, U.S.	Won WBA and The Ring light welterweight titles
24	Win	24–0	Carl Crowley	KO	1 (10), 2:15	Jun 20, 1980	Cincinnati Gardens, Cincinnati, Ohio, U.S.	
23	Win	23–0	Leonidas Asprilla	TKO	10 (10), 2:00	Apr 13, 1980	Municipal Auditorium, Kansas City, Missouri, U.S.	
22	Win	22–0	Julio Valdez	TKO	4 (10)	Mar 16, 1980	Jai-Alai Fronton, Miami, Florida, U.S.	
21	Win	21–0	Juan Garcia	KO	1 (10), 0:28	Feb 24, 1980	Tropicana Las Vegas, Paradise, Nevada, U.S.	
20	Win	20–0	Alfonso Frazer	TKO	5 (10), 2:40	Oct 20, 1979	Riverfront Coliseum, Cincinnati, Ohio, U.S.	
19	Win	19–0	Jose Fernandez	KO	1 (10), 0:55	Jun 23, 1979	Cincinnati Gardens, Cincinnati, Ohio, U.S.	
18	Win	18–0	Al Ford	TKO	4 (10), 2:29	May 11, 1979	Cincinnati Gardens, Cincinnati, Ohio, U.S.	
17	Win	17–0	Freddie Harris	TKO	3 (10), 2:55	Apr 27, 1979	Convention Center, Dayton, Ohio, U.S.	
16	Win	16–0	Norman Goins	KO	9 (10), 2:45	Apr 13, 1979	Cincinnati Gardens, Cincinnati, Ohio, U.S.	
15	Win	15–0	Johnny Copeland	KO	7 (10), 1:42	Mar 16, 1979	Cincinnati Gardens, Cincinnati, Ohio, U.S.	
14	Win	14–0	Marion Thomas	KO	8	Jul 18, 1978	Hara Arena, Dayton, Ohio, U.S.	
13	Win	13–0	Scotty Foreman	TKO	6 (10), 2:15	May 3, 1978	Convention Center, Miami Beach, Florida, U.S.	
12	Win	12–0	Al Franklin	TKO	3 (10), 2:58	Mar 10, 1978	Cincinnati Gardens, Cincinnati, Ohio, U.S.	
11	Win	11–0	Ron Pettigrew	TKO	2 (8), 2:18	Mar 1, 1978	Hara Arena, Dayton, Ohio, U.S.	
10	Win	10–0	Robert Tijernia	TKO	2 (10), 2:25	Jan 16, 1978	Convention-Exposition Center, Cincinnati, Ohio, U.S.	
9	Win	9–0	Angel Cintron	TKO	3 (8)	Nov 11, 1977	Convention-Exposition Center, Cincinnati, Ohio, U.S.	
8	Win	8–0	Johnny Summerhays	UD	8	Oct 7, 1977	Convention-Exposition Center, Cincinnati, Ohio, U.S.	
7	Win	7–0	Melvin Young	KO	4 (6)	Sep 3, 1977	Drawbridge Inn, Covington, Kentucky, U.S.	
6	Win	6–0	Jose Resto	UD	8	May 7, 1977	Riverfront Coliseum, Cincinnati, Ohio, U.S.	
5	Win	5–0	Isaac Vega	KO	2 (6), 0:48	Mar 26, 1977	Riverfront Coliseum, Cincinnati, Ohio, U.S.	
4	Win	4–0	Nick Wills	KO	1	Mar 12, 1977	Lincoln Heights, Ohio, U.S.	
3	Win	3–0	Harvey Wilson	TKO	1 (6), 2:04	Feb 24, 1977	Riverfront Coliseum, Cincinnati, Ohio, U.S.	
2	Win	2–0	Larry Moore	TKO	3 (6)	Feb 1, 1977	Convention Center, Cincinnati, Ohio, U.S.	
1	Win	1–0	Larry Smith	TKO	2 (6), 2:04	Nov 12, 1976	Convention-Exposition Center, Cincinnati, Ohio, U.S.	

== Death ==
Pryor died on October 9, 2016, after developing heart disease.

Sporting positions
Amateur boxing titles
Previous: Norman Goins	U.S. lightweight champion 1973	Next: Hilmer Kenty
Previous: Curtis Harris	U.S. Golden Gloves lightweight champion 1975, 1976	Next: Samuel Ayala
World boxing titles
Preceded by Antonio Cervantes	WBA light welterweight champion August 2, 1980 – October 26, 1983; Retired	Vacant Title next held by Johnny Bumphus
Preceded by Antonio Cervantes	The Ring light welterweight champion August 2, 1980 - October 26, 1983; Retired	Vacant Title next held by Kostya Tszyu
Inaugural champion	IBF light welterweight champion June 22, 1984 – December 9, 1985; Stripped	Vacant Title next held by Gary Hinton
