= Miguel Montilla =

Dominican boxer (born 1952)

Personal information
- Nationality: Dominican
- Born: July 14, 1952 (age 74) Neiba, Dominican Republic
- Weight: Junior lightweight; Lightweight; Light welterweight

Boxing career

Boxing record
- Total fights: 50
- Wins: 38
- Win by KO: 28
- Losses: 9
- Draws: 3

Miguel Montilla (born July 14, 1952, in Neiba, Dominican Republic) is a former professional boxer in the Junior Welterweight or Super Lightweight division who fought three times unsuccessfully for world championships. A hard hitter with good boxing skills, Montilla was popular in the Dominican Republic, Puerto Rico and the United States, all countries where he fought several times. He also fought in Panama, the United States Virgin Islands and Colombia

== Professional boxing career ==
=== Rise to the top ===
Montilla's first professional fight was also his first professional fight abroad, as he debuted against local, Puerto Rican prospect Eduardo Trinidad on February 19, 1972, at the Hiram Bithorn Stadium in San Juan, Puerto Rico, as part of a program headlined by International Boxing Hall of Fame member Carlos Ortiz. Trinidad was also making his debut. The pair fought to a six-rounds draw (tie).

Montilla's next fight was not only his first fight in the United States but also his first victory as a professional boxer and his first knockout. Faced with undefeated, 6 wins, 0 losses Ricky Capitano on Friday, February 25, 1972, at the Madison Square Garden in New York City, Montilla stopped Capitano in round one of a scheduled six-rounds contest.

Montilla's next two fights were draws versus Roberto Ayala and Nestor Rojas, but on June 6, 1972, he was pitted against Joe Cartwright, a boxer with a record of 12 wins, 7 losses and 3 draws. Montilla lasted the ten rounds distance but lost by unanimous decision at the Miami Marine Stadium in Key Biscayne, Florida.

After beating winless (0–2) Radames Checo in Santo Domingo by a 12 rounds unanimous decision to lift the until then vacant Dominican Republic's national Lightweight title on February 19, 1973, Montilla gained what is widely considered his biggest win as a professional: facing future WBC world Junior Lightweight champion Alfredo Escalera (11 wins and 3 losses coming in) on Saturday, March 3, 1973, in San Juan, Puerto Rico, Montilla prevailed by ten rounds' decision.

On May 1, 1973, Montilla gained revenge over Joe Cartwright, beating him on points over ten rounds in Miami, but on July 14 of the same year, it was Escalera's turn to gain revenge over Montilla when the Puerto Rican stopped Montilla in round eight, winning by technical knockout in a fight which took place in Caguas.

Of his next five fights, Montilla won four, the lone loss in that period being to Hector Julio Medina, a future Esteban De Jesus world title challenger, when he lost to Medina on points over twelve rounds at Santo Domingo to lose the Dominican national lightweight title on February 23, 1974. A sixth-round knockout in Santo Domingo over Chris Fernandez (25 wins, 9 losses and 4 draws coming in) on October 1, 1974 and a ten rounds decision over Antonio Amaya of Panama on February 17 of the same year at Santo Domingo also, placed Montilla among the WBA's top ten ranked boxers in the lightweight division for the first time.

After the defeat at the hands of Medina, Montilla built a streak of 18 wins in a row, 16 of those wins by knockout. Included in that streak was a win over 22–3–1 Mike Everett, dispatched in the first round of a fight that took place at Santo Domingo on April 15, 1977, and one over Mexican, former WBC world Super Featherweight champion, Ricardo Arredondo, beaten by ten-rounds decision at Santo Domingo on September 16, 1977. Arredondo had 76 wins, 18 losses and 1 draw in 95 previous contests. Montilla was, after his victory over Arredondo, the WBA's number one Junior Welterweight challenger.

==== First world title challenge ====
On Thursday, January 18, 1979, Montilla challenged WBA world Junior Welterweight champion, the legendary, future International Boxing Hall of Fame member Antonio Cervantes of Colombia, 60 wins, 10 losses and 1 draw coming in, at the Madison Square Garden in New York. The fight was a very closely contested one; Montilla lost his first world title try by a unanimous decision but it was close enough for a rematch to be considered afterwards; he lost to the champion by scores of 147–142 (fight judge Jesus Celis), 143–142 (Tony Castellano) and 145–143 (Rodolfo Hill).

=== Road to second world title fight ===
Montilla won four fights in a row following the defeat in New York to Cervantes. One of them was an important victory over fellow Cervantes world championship challenger, Adriano Marrero, whom Montilla beat on Wednesday, August 15, 1979, to lift the Dominican Republic's national Junior Welterweight title, thus making Montilla a two division national champion. The win over the 27 wins, 12 losses and 2 draws Marrero, a first-round knockout, took place in Santo Domingo.

==== Second world title challenge ====
In March 1980, Montilla flew to Colombia, where on Saturday, March 29 of that year, he challenged Cervantes, by now 62 wins, 10 losses and 1 draw in 73 professional contests, again for the Colombian's WBA world Junior Welterweight championship. The second time around, the crafty Colombian was better adapted to Montilla's style and he dominated Montilla, building a substantial lead (60–53 on Puerto Rico's Waldemar Schmidt, 60–53 on the United States' Harold Lederman and 60–55 on Panama's Marcos A. Torres) on the three scorecards before Montilla was stopped in round seven, losing by technical knockout at Cartagena's Plaza de Toros bullring.

=== Road to third world title fight ===
Montilla recovered from the second loss to Cervantes by taking on Gerardo Farias, a limited fighter with a record of 4 wins, 4 losses and 1 draw, in Santo Domingo on Friday, June 25, 1980. He won that fight by second-round knockout. He then scored what could also be considered the biggest win of his career (along with the aforementioned win over Alfredo Escalera) when he took on the former WBA world Junior Welterweight champion, Panama's Alfonso "Peppermint" Frazer, on October 20 of the same year, stopping Frazer, who was 42–15–3 coming in, in nine rounds at Santo Domingo.

On December 6, 1980, at the Joe Louis Arena in Detroit, Michigan, Montilla lost a ten-rounds unanimous decision to 11 wins, 0 losses prospect Dujuan Johnson as part of an undercard headlined by a Thomas Hearns WBA world Welterweight title defense against Luis Primera. Almost a year later, Johnson himself challenged for a world championship.

== Third world title challenge ==
The loss to Johnson was followed by two wins, including one over ranked Puerto Rican Domingo Ayala by a third-round technical knockout on May 11, 1981, at the Madison Square Garden in New York. Then came Montilla's third try at the WBA world Junior Welterweight championship. The champion now was the fast-fisted, heavy hitting legend and also future International Boxing Hall of Fame member, Aaron Pryor, who was 29–0, with 27 wins by knockout, coming into their Sunday, March 21, 1982, contest at the Playboy Hotel and Casino in Atlantic City, New Jersey. Montilla gave Pryor a tough test but was already well behind on the scorecards (by scores of 108–102, 107–103 and 109–101, all against him) when the match was stopped in round twelve, Pryor retaining the title by a technical knockout, 42 seconds into that round.

== Career decline ==
Montilla fought only three more times after the loss to Pryor; he lost two of those fights. One was against future world title challenger Reyes Antonio Cruz, undefeated in 19 previous fights with 18 wins and 1 draw when the two faced each other on Thursday, August 12, 1982, with Montilla's Dominican Republic's national Junior Welterweight title on the line. Cruz won the championship by a twelve-rounds points decision at Santo Domingo.

Around this time, a proposed match with future WBA world Junior Welterweight champion Johnny Bumphus, which was going to be televised nationally on NBC, fell through. Montilla was going to earn $40,000 dollars for that outing.

Montilla retired a winner, as he beat the 2 wins, 5 losses Emilio Sotomayor by a first-round knockout on Wednesday, January 19, 1983, at the same stadium he debuted at, the Hiram Bithorn Stadium in San Juan, Puerto Rico, as part of a program headlined by the WBA world Junior Lightweight championship bout between champion Samuel Serrano of Puerto Rico and challenger Roger Mayweather of the United States.

== Career in review ==
A hard-hitting three-time world title challenger, Montilla retired with a record of 38 wins, 9 losses and 3 draws (ties) in 50 total bouts in his career, with 28 wins and 3 losses by knockout. All three of his knockout losses came to world champion boxers (Alfredo Escalera, Antonio Cervantes and Aaron Pryor).

== Life after boxing ==
He settled in the American city of New York. A few years after settling there, there were rumors that he had died. Montilla went on live radio to dispel the rumors and prove he is still alive.

=== After boxing honors ===
In 2015, Montilla was selected to the Dominican Republic National Sports Hall of Fame, becoming the first athlete from his native Neiba to be given such honor. In announcing his election, Dominican newspaper "El Nacional" denounced his decision loss in his first match with Cervantes as a "controversial" one and that same bout as "one of the greatest ever".

On September 19, 2019, Montilla along with Julio "Diablito" Valdez were recognized for their professional boxing careers by the Old Boxing Legends National Front of the Dominican Republic, at a ceremony held in Santo Domingo.

== See also ==
- List of people from the Dominican Republic
