= Gary Hinton =

American boxer

Personal information
- Born: August 29, 1956 (age 69) Darby, Pennsylvania, U.S.
- Height: 5 ft 9 in (175 cm)
- Weight: Light welterweight

Boxing career
- Stance: Southpaw

Boxing record
- Total fights: 36
- Wins: 29
- Win by KO: 11
- Losses: 5
- Draws: 2

Gary Hinton (born 1956-08-29 in Darby, PA) is a retired American boxer who boxed at light welterweight.

== Professional career ==
Hinton turned pro in 1978.In 1985 he challenged Aaron Pryor for the IBF light welterweight title and lost a split decision over 15 rounds. When Pryor was stripped of his title for not defending it, he won the vacant IBF light welterweight title with a decision win over Reyes Antonio Cruz in 1986. He lost the title in his first defense to Joe Manley by KO later that year, exactly 12 years after Muhammad Ali defeated George Foreman.

== Professional boxing record ==
36 fights	29 wins	5 losses
By knockout	11	2
By decision	18	3
Draws	2	

No.	Result	Record	Opponent	Type	Round, time	Date	Location	Notes
36	Loss	29–5–2	Saoul Mamby	TKO	9 (10)	1989-08-24	Hyatt Regency, Tampa, Florida, U.S.	
35	Win	29–4–2	Joe Walker	MD	10 (10)	1989-02-23	The Palace, Auburn Hills, Michigan, U.S.	
34	Win	28–4–2	Juan Alonso Villa	TKO	4 (10)	1988-10-20	Woodhaven Sports Center, Philadelphia, Pennsylvania, U.S.	
33	Win	27–4–2	Dexter Smith	UD	10 (10)	1988-07-07	Hyatt Regency, Tampa, Florida, U.S.	
32	Win	26–4–2	Frank Montgomery	UD	10 (10)	1988-05-05	Sands Casino Hotel, Atlantic City, New Jersey, U.S.	
31	Loss	25–4–2	Joe Manley	KO	10 (15)	1986-10-30	Civic Center, Hartford, Connecticut, U.S.	Lost IBF light-welterweight title
30	Win	25–3–2	Reyes Antonio Cruz	UD	15 (15)	1986-04-26	Palazzo Dello Sport, Lucca, Italy	Won vacant IBF light-welterweight title
29	Win	24–3–2	Darryl Fuller	UD	12 (12)	1985-11-05	Sands Casino Hotel, Atlantic City, New Jersey, U.S.	Won WBC Continental Americas light-welterweight title
28	Draw	23–3–2	Joe Manley	SD	12 (12)	1985-08-23	Atlantis Hotel & Casino, Atlantic City, New Jersey, U.S.	Retained USBA light-welterweight title
27	Loss	23–3–1	Aaron Pryor	SD	15 (15)	1985-03-02	Sands Casino Hotel, Atlantic City, New Jersey, U.S.	For IBF light-welterweight title
26	Win	23–2–1	Brett Lally	MD	12 (12)	1984-07-11	Sands Casino Hotel, Atlantic City, New Jersey, U.S.	Retained USBA light-welterweight title
25	Win	22–2–1	Jerome Kinney	UD	12 (12)	1984-03-26	Sands Casino Hotel, Atlantic City, New Jersey, U.S.	Won vacant USBA light-welterweight title
24	Win	21–2–1	Felix Reyes	UD	10 (10)	1983-12-17	Sands Casino Hotel, Atlantic City, New Jersey, U.S.	
23	Win	20–2–1	Steve Mitchell	TKO	5 (8)	1983-08-31	Sands Casino Hotel, Atlantic City, New Jersey, U.S.	
22	Win	19–2–1	Clemente Rojas	TKO	5 (10)	1983-03-14	Resorts Casino Hotel, Atlantic City, New Jersey, U.S.	
21	Win	18–2–1	Jose Renta	KO	2 (10)	1983-02-13	Sands Casino Hotel, Atlantic City, New Jersey, U.S.	
20	Win	17–2–1	Sam Gervins	PTS	8 (8)	1982-11-24	Resorts Casino Hotel, Atlantic City, New Jersey, U.S.	
19	Win	16–2–1	Luis Mejias	TKO	7 (8)	1982-04-15	Sands Casino Hotel, Atlantic City, New Jersey, U.S.	
18	Win	15–2–1	Victor Mangual	RTD	3 (8)	1981-12-22	Sands Casino Hotel, Atlantic City, New Jersey, U.S.	
17	Loss	14–2–1	Curtis Harris	SD	10 (10)	1981-11-14	Sands Casino Hotel, Atlantic City, New Jersey, U.S.	
16	Win	14–1–1	Teddy Hatfield	TKO	3 (8)	1981-09-02	Martin Luther King Arena, Philadelphia, Pennsylvania, U.S.	
15	Win	13–1–1	Victor Mangual	UD	8 (8)	1981-07-30	Martin Luther King Arena, Philadelphia, Pennsylvania, U.S.	
14	Win	12–1–1	Wyatt Simpkins	UD	8 (8)	1981-06-17	Martin Luther King Arena, Philadelphia, Pennsylvania, U.S.	
13	Win	11–1–1	Orlando Montalvo	KO	3 (8)	1981-02-05	Resorts Casino Hotel, Atlantic City, New Jersey, U.S.	
12	Win	10–1–1	Jerry Graham	PTS	8 (8)	1980-11-12	Wynne Ballroom, Philadelphia, Pennsylvania, U.S.	
11	Draw	9–1–1	Ernest Jackson	PTS	8 (8)	1980-10-01	Resorts Casino Hotel, Atlantic City, New Jersey, U.S.	
10	Loss	9–1	Charlie Brown	SD	10 (10)	1980-07-03	Resorts Casino Hotel, Atlantic City, New Jersey, U.S.	
9	Win	9–0	Ronnie Green	SD	8 (8)	1980-06-05	Resorts Casino Hotel, Atlantic City, New Jersey, U.S.	
8	Win	8–0	Jerry Graham	PTS	6 (6)	1979-11-14	Spectrum, Philadelphia, Pennsylvania, U.S.	
7	Win	7–0	Jorge Nina	UD	6 (6)	1979-07-16	Spectrum, Philadelphia, Pennsylvania, U.S.	
6	Win	6–0	Lou Daniels	KO	2 (6)	1979-04-10	The Blue Horizon, Philadelphia, Pennsylvania, U.S.	
5	Win	5–0	Michael Ross	PTS	6 (6)	1979-01-23	The Blue Horizon, Philadelphia, Pennsylvania, U.S.	
4	Win	4–0	Billy Jones	TKO	2 (4)	1978-10-24	Spectrum, Philadelphia, Pennsylvania, U.S.	
3	Win	3–0	Billy Jones	PTS	4 (4)	1978-09-21	The Blue Horizon, Philadelphia, Pennsylvania, U.S.	
2	Win	2–0	Darryl Guyton	KO	3 (4)	1978-06-06	The Blue Horizon, Philadelphia, Pennsylvania, U.S.	
1	Win	1–0	Billy Jones	PTS	4 (4)	1978-01-24	The Blue Horizon, Philadelphia, Pennsylvania, U.S.	

== See also ==
- List of southpaw stance boxers
- List of world light-welterweight boxing champions

Sporting positions
Regional boxing titles
Vacant Title last held by Johnny Bumphus	USBA light-welterweight champion March 26, 1984 – 1986; Vacated	Vacant Title next held by Frankie Warren
Preceded by Darryl Fuller	WBC Continental Americas light-welterweight champion November 5, 1985 – 1985; Vacated	Vacant Title next held by Buddy McGirt
World boxing titles
Vacant Title last held by Aaron Pryor	IBF light-welterweight champion April 26, 1986 – October 30, 1986	Succeeded by Joe Manley
