= Terry Marsh (boxer) =

English boxer (born 1958)

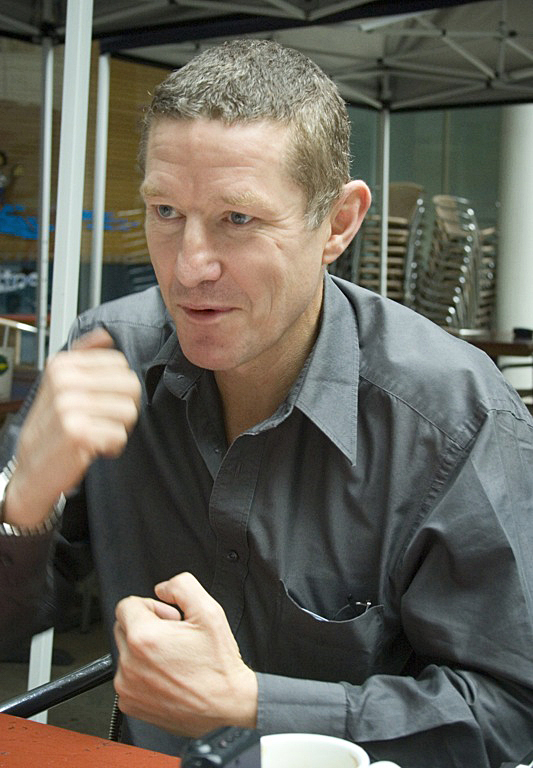
- Marsh in October 2005

Personal information
- Nickname: "The Fighting Fireman"
- Nationality: English
- Born: 7 February 1958 (age 68) Stepney, London, England
- Weight: Light welterweight

Boxing career
- Stance: Orthodox

Boxing record
- Total fights: 27
- Wins: 26
- Win by KO: 10
- Draws: 1

Terry Marsh (born 7 February 1958) is an English former professional boxer who was an undefeated world champion in the light welterweight division.

Marsh was a three-time ABA senior amateur champion who went on to become the British, European and IBF light welterweight world champion as a professional. He was the second European boxer to retire as an undefeated World Champion, after Jack McAuliffe, a feat later equalled by Romanian Michael Loewe, Germany's Sven Ottke, Welshman Joe Calzaghe, and Russian Dmitry Pirog.

Marsh was charged with the attempted murder of his former manager, the boxing promoter, Frank Warren following Warren's shooting in London in 1989. Marsh spent 10 months on remand before he was released after being acquitted at trial.

Marsh changed his name by deed poll to "None Of The Above X" and stood in the 2010 and 2015 UK general elections as an independent candidate in protest against there being no option to vote for "none of the above".

== Early life ==
Marsh was born in Stepney, East London, where he grew up in a small terraced house with his parents and three brothers. Marsh, who was a junior chess champion, began boxing as a youth at the St George's Club in Stepney before the family moved to Basildon in Essex. Marsh attended Westminster City School between 1969 and 1971.

Before he became a professional boxer, Marsh was a Royal Marine who served in Cyprus and in Crossmaglen in Northern Ireland during the Troubles. He later became a firefighter with the Essex County Fire and Rescue Service, serving on White Watch, Tilbury.

== Amateur career ==
As an amateur Marsh was a National schoolboy champion, NABC champion and twice junior ABA champion before going on to win three senior national titles whilst representing the Royal Navy boxing team. Marsh's first title came in 1978 in the lightweight division beating Edmund Gajny in the final. The following year Marsh moved up to the light welterweight division and again reached the final but was this time defeated by Eddie Copeland. In 1980, Marsh again moved up a weight, to welterweight, and again reached the final, defeating Edward Byrne. 1981 saw Marsh's final year as an amateur: this year he remained at welterweight and again reached the final, his fourth in a row. In the 67 kg final, he defeated the future British, Commonwealth and WBO champion Chris Pyatt to win his third senior title. He also won a multi-nations gold medal representing England in the Philippines in 1981 capping an unbeaten international amateur record.

== Professional career ==
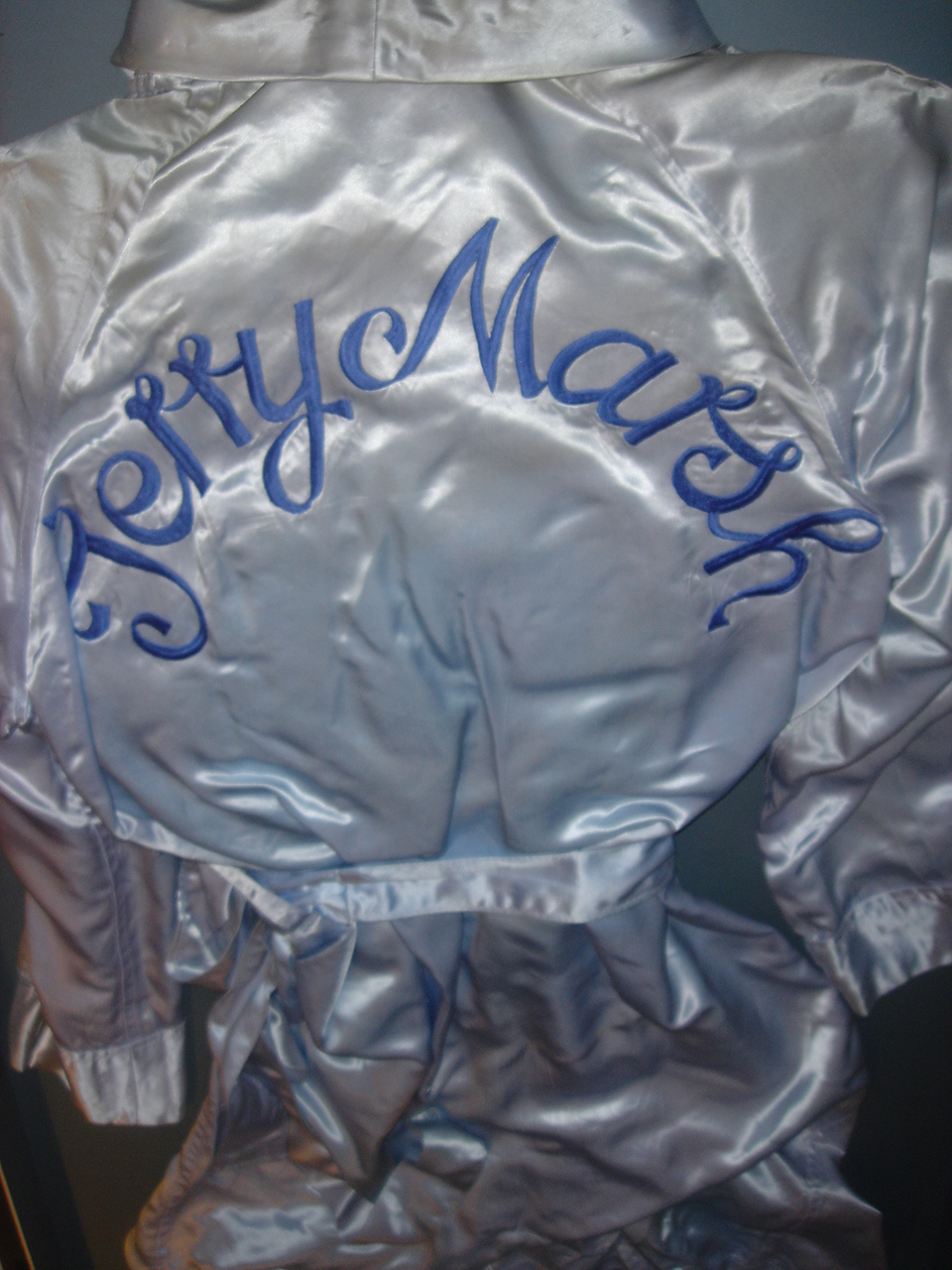
Robe worn during his defence.

He had his first professional fight in October 1981, defeating Andrew DaCosta on points over six rounds, in Bloomsbury, London.

In his thirteenth fight he won the vacant Southern Area Light-Welterweight Title, defeating Vernon Vanriel on points over ten rounds, at York Hall in Bethnal Green.

In September 1984, he defeated Clinton McKenzie to take the British Light-Welterweight Title. The fight was at the Britannia Leisure Centre, Shoreditch, and Marsh won on points over twelve rounds.

In October 1985, he fought the Italian, Alessandro Scapecchi for the vacant European Light-Welterweight Title. The bout was held in Monte Carlo and Marsh won by a knock out in the seventh round.

He successfully defended his European title against the Frenchman Tusikoleta Nkalankete in January 1986, with a further successful defence on April 12, 1986, when Marsh faced Italian Francesco Prezioso at the Palace Lido, Douglas, Isle of Man, securing a win on points after 12 rounds.

On 4 March 1987, he fought the American, Joe Manley for the International Boxing Federation (IBF) World Light-Welterweight title. The fight was at his home town of Basildon, and Marsh won on a technical knockout in the tenth round.

On 1 July 1987, he defended his IBF title against Japanese fighter, Akio Kameda at the Royal Albert Hall, Kensington. Insisting it would be his last fight Marsh won, by a technical knockout in the seventh round.

He then retired as undefeated IBF world champion. In September 1987 he announced that he had epilepsy.

He took up chessboxing at the age 56 winning the World Chessboxing Association welterweight title against Dymer Agasaryan from Armenia.

== Shooting of Frank Warren ==
On 30 November 1989, Warren was to attend one of his boxing promotions at The Broadway theatre in Barking which featured Colin McMillan. As he arrived at the venue he was approached by a masked gunman who appeared from the crowd and shot him twice in the chest with .22 bullets from a Luger pistol at close range. The gunman fled and Warren was taken to hospital. Warren lost half a lung and was in great pain after the shooting.

The business style of Warren had made him enemies, and following his shooting there were a number of suspects. The ongoing libel case between Marsh and Warren led police to believe Marsh had a strong personal motive to undertake the attack due to the bad blood between the pair.

During a search of Marsh's home police found ammunition in his possession, but this was explained by Marsh's previous career as a Marine and it did not match the bullets used in the attack. Two months after the shooting and despite the lack of forensic evidence, any confession or identification, Marsh was charged with the attempted murder of Frank Warren and was remanded in custody.

During the trial a prison confession was used against Marsh. Marsh did not appear in the witness box to give evidence. He was subsequently acquitted.

The outstanding libel case was subsequently contested by the two protagonists and the jury found in favour of Marsh.

== Personal life ==
Marsh retired in December 1987 after he was diagnosed as having epilepsy. In the late 1980s, the Terry Marsh Leisure Centre in Pitsea, Essex was named in his honour. However, subsequent squabbles between local councillors have seen this renamed the Eversley Leisure Centre, although the plaque bearing his image remains.

Since then, Marsh has attempted to enter politics, first for the Labour Party. However, when Labour announced they would have a female-only short-list for Basildon, he stood for the Liberal Democrats at the 1997 General Election, but was forced to withdraw from the contest, as he was charged with fraud and deception for allegedly having fraudulently claimed two student grants after going back to the then London Guildhall University at the end of his boxing career. He was later cleared of the offence. In 2009, he set up a new political party, NOTA, which stands for "None of the Above".

He had an acting role in the 1989 film Tank Malling, and has since written and published his autobiography, Undefeated.

Following his retirement from boxing Marsh became a stockbroker.

== Political campaigning ==
Marsh stood in the 2010 general election in the seat of South Basildon and East Thurrock as an independent candidate. He changed his name by deed poll to "None Of The Above X" as a protest against there being no facility to select "none of the above" as an option on the ballot paper. Under UK law, a political party cannot call itself "None of the Above", but this restriction does not apply to candidate names. His chosen surname of "X" meant that he was likely to be the last entry on the ballot paper. He said that if he won he would not take his seat. He received 125 votes, placing last out of six candidates. In the same election a candidate who changed his name to "None of the Above Zero" stood in Filton and Bradley Stoke. Marsh stood again as "None Of The Above X" in 2015, this time receiving 253 votes and placing sixth of seven candidates.

In other UK elections Marsh has symbolically voted for none of the above by leaving the polling station carrying his uncast ballot paper.

== Amateur achievements ==
- 1973 Junior ABA champion
- 1974 Junior ABA champion
- 1974 National schoolboy champion
- 1976 NABC champion
- 1978 ABA Lightweight champion
- 1980 ABA Welterweight champion
- 1981 ABA Welterweight champion
- 1981 Multi-Nations Gold Medalist - Manila

== Professional boxing record ==
27 fights	26 wins	0 losses
By knockout	10	0
By decision	15	0
By disqualification	1	0
Draws	1	

No.	Result	Record	Opponent	Type	Round, time	Date	Location	Notes
27	Win	26–0–1	Akio Kameda	TKO	7 (15), 0:20	Jul 1, 1987	Royal Albert Hall, Kensington, London, England, UK	Retained IBF light welterweight title
26	Win	25–0–1	Joe Manley	TKO	10 (15), 0:20	Mar 4, 1987	Festival Hall Super Tent, Basildon, Essex, England, UK	Won IBF light welterweight title
25	Win	24–0–1	David Taylor	TKO	2 (10), 2:59	Jan 28, 1987	Fairfield Hall, Croydon, London, England, UK	
24	Win	23–0–1	Rick Kaiser	KO	7 (10)	May 28, 1986	Alexandra Pavilion, Muswell Hill, London, England, UK	
23	Win	22–0–1	Francesco Prezioso	PTS	12	Apr 12, 1986	Palace Lido, Douglas, Isle of Man, UK	Retained European light welterweight title
22	Win	21–0–1	Tusikoleta Nkalankete	UD	12	Jan 22, 1986	Alexandra Pavilion, Muswell Hill, London, England, UK	Retained European light welterweight title
21	Win	20–0–1	Alessandro Scapecchi	TKO	6 (12)	Oct 24, 1985	Stade Louis II, Fontvieille, Monaco	Won vacant European light welterweight title
20	Win	19–0–1	Lee McKenzie	PTS	10	Sep 12, 1985	Free Trade Hall, Manchester, Lancashire, England, UK	
19	Win	18–0–1	Randy Mitchem	TKO	6 (10), 1:10	May 28, 1985	Alexandra Pavilion, Muswell Hill, London, England, UK	
18	Win	17–0–1	Peter Eubanks	TKO	8 (10)	Jan 16, 1985	Britannia Leisure Centre, Shoreditch, London, England, UK	
17	Win	16–0–1	Arthur Clarke	TKO	2 (10), 1:04	Dec 5, 1984	Alexandra Pavilion, Muswell Hill, London, England, UK	
16	Win	15–0–1	Clinton McKenzie	PTS	12	Sep 19, 1984	Britannia Leisure Centre, Shoreditch, London, England, UK	Won BBBofC British light welterweight title
15	Win	14–0–1	Tony Sinnott	PTS	12	Apr 16, 1984	Yorkshire Executive SC, Norfolk Gardens Hotel, Yorkshire, England, UK	
14	Win	13–0–1	Lee McKenzie	PTS	8	Nov 9, 1983	20th Century SC, Cliffs Pavilion, Southend, Essex, England, UK	
13	Win	12–0–1	Vernon Vanriel	PTS	10	Apr 26, 1983	York Hall, Bethnal Green, London, England, UK	Won vacant BBBofC Southern Area light welterweight title
12	Win	11–0–1	Andy Thomas	TKO	4 (8)	Mar 16, 1983	Town Hall, Cheltenham, Gloucestershire, England, UK	
11	Win	10–0–1	Didier Kowalski	PTS	8	Feb 19, 1983	Saint-Amand-les-Eaux, France	
10	Win	9–0–1	Chris Sanigar	DQ	7 (8)	Oct 11, 1982	Locarno Ballroom, Bristol, Avon, England, UK	Sanigar DQ'd for striking Marsh while he was down
9	Win	8–0–1	Robert Armstrong	PTS	8	Sep 7, 1982	Town Hall, Hornsey, London, England, UK	
8	Win	7–0–1	Dave Finigan	TKO	5 (8)	Aug 10, 1982	Lyceum Ballroom, The Strand, London, England, UK	
7	Draw	6–0–1	Lloyd Christie	PTS	8	Apr 5, 1982	Bloomsbury Centre Hotel, Bloomsbury, London, England, UK	
6	Win	6–0	Gerry McGrath	PTS	8	Mar 9, 1982	Town Hall, Hornsey, London, England, UK	
5	Win	5–0	Arthur Davis	PTS	6	Feb 19, 1982	Bloomsbury Centre Hotel, Bloomsbury, London, England, UK	
4	Win	4–0	Gary Brooks	PTS	6	Dec 8, 1981	20th Century Sporting Club, Southend, Essex, England, UK	
3	Win	3–0	Ian 'Kid' Murray	PTS	6	Nov 23, 1981	Bloomsbury Centre Hotel, Bloomsbury, London, England, UK	
2	Win	2–0	Dave Sullivan	PTS	6	Oct 28, 1981	Town Hall, Acton, London, England, UK	
1	Win	1–0	Andrew DaCosta	PTS	6	Oct 12, 1981	Bloomsbury Centre Hotel, Bloomsbury, London, England, UK	

Preceded by Joe Manley	IBF Light Welterweight Champion; 4 March 1987 – December 1987 (retires)	Succeeded by Buddy McGirt
