= Joe Manley =

American boxer (1959–2023)

Personal information
- Born: Joe Louis Manley Jr. June 11, 1959 Lima, Ohio, U.S.
- Died: May 2, 2023 (aged 63) New Orleans, Louisiana, U.S.
- Height: 5 ft 8 in (173 cm)
- Weight: Light welterweight

Boxing career
- Reach: 67 in (170 cm)
- Stance: Orthodox

Boxing record
- Total fights: 39
- Wins: 29
- Win by KO: 14
- Losses: 8
- Draws: 2

Joe Louis Manley Jr. (June 11, 1959 – May 2, 2023) was an American boxer who fought at light welterweight.

== Amateur career ==
Manley qualified as a lightweight for the 1980 United States Olympic team, defeating Frankie Randall on his way to earning his berth. Manley did not compete, however, due to the U.S. boycott of the Moscow Olympics. Manley was also the 1981 United States Amateur champion at lightweight.

== Professional career ==
Manley became a professional boxer in 1981. He lost to future champion Gene Hatcher in 1983 but defeated another future champion, Freddie Pendleton, in 1985. He qualified for his title shot by winning a decision over Howard Davis Jr. in February 1986. He went on to win the International Boxing Federation light welterweight title with a 10th-round knockout over Gary Hinton in October 1986. He lost the title to Terry Marsh in 1987. He retired in 1989 after a loss to future world champion Loreto Garza and James McGirt.

== Professional boxing record ==
39 fights	29 wins	8 losses
By knockout	14	5
By decision	15	3
Draws	2	

No.	Result	Record	Opponent	Type	Round, time	Date	Location	Notes
39	Loss	29–8–2	Buddy McGirt	TKO	9 (10)	1989-11-10	Villa Roma Resort, Callicoon, New York, U.S.	
38	Win	29–7–2	Donnie Poole	UD	10 (10)	1989-09-20	War Memorial Auditorium, Rochester, New York, U.S.	
37	Loss	28–7–2	Henry Anaya Jr	KO	5 (10)	1989-06-17	Tingley Coliseum, Albuquerque, New Mexico, U.S.	
36	Loss	28–6–2	Loreto Garza	KO	7 (10)	1989-01-25	ARCO Arena, Sacramento, California, U.S.	
35	Win	28–5–2	Ray Gastellum	TKO	1 (8)	1988-10-27	Convention Center, Tucson, Arizona, U.S.	
34	Draw	27–5–2	Luis Mora	PTS	8 (8)	1988-08-13	Pima County Fairgrounds, Tucson, Arizona, U.S.	
33	Loss	27–5–1	Dexter Smith	KO	2 (10)	1988-01-23	Cobo Arena, Detroit, Michigan, U.S.	
32	Win	27–4–1	Martin Quiroz	UD	10 (10)	1987-06-14	Harrah's Marina Resort, Atlantic City, New Jersey, U.S.	
31	Loss	26–4–1	Terry Marsh	TKO	10 (15)	1987-03-04	Festival Hall Super Tent, Basildon, England, U.K.	Lost IBF light-welterweight title
30	Win	26–3–1	Gary Hinton	KO	10 (15)	1986-10-30	Civic Center, Hartford, Connecticut, U.S.	Won IBF light-welterweight title
29	Win	25–3–1	Sammy Young	UD	6 (6)	1986-07-26	Civic Center, Glens Falls, New York, U.S.	
28	Win	24–3–1	Howard Davis Jr.	UD	10 (10)	1986-02-28	Golden Nugget, Atlantic City, New Jersey, U.S.	
27	Win	23–3–1	Frank Montgomery	UD	10 (10)	1985-11-21	Atlantis Hotel & Casino, Atlantic City, New Jersey, U.S.	
26	Draw	22–3–1	Gary Hinton	SD	12 (12)	1985-08-23	Atlantis Hotel & Casino, Atlantic City, New Jersey, U.S.	For USBA light-welterweight title
25	Win	22–3	George Brown	TKO	7 (10)	1985-07-10	Atlantis Hotel & Casino, Atlantic City, New Jersey, U.S.	
24	Loss	21–3	Ronnie Shields	UD	12 (12)	1985-03-25	Felt Forum, New York City, New York, U.S.	For NABF light-welterweight title
23	Win	21–2	Freddie Pendleton	UD	10 (10)	1985-02-05	Atlantis Hotel & Casino, Atlantic City, New Jersey, U.S.	
22	Win	20–2	Terry Whittaker	TKO	7 (10)	1984-12-14	Felt Forum, New York City, New York, U.S.	
21	Win	19–2	Charlie Allen	TKO	7 (10)	1984-09-26	Felt Forum, New York City, New York, U.S.	
20	Win	18–2	Victor Babilonia	UD	10 (10)	1984-06-29	Felt Forum, New York City, New York, U.S.	
19	Win	17–2	Terry Whittaker	UD	10 (10)	1984-05-25	Felt Forum, New York City, New York, U.S.	
18	Win	16–2	Andre Wynn	TKO	1 (10)	1984-04-27	Felt Forum, New York City, New York, U.S.	
17	Win	15–2	Cesar Guzman	PTS	8 (8)	1984-03-13	Champ's Camp, Philadelphia, Pennsylvania, U.S.	
16	Win	14–2	Bobby Johnson	TKO	3 (10)	1984-02-07	Tropicana Hotel & Casino, Atlantic City, New Jersey, U.S.	
15	Loss	13–2	Gene Hatcher	UD	12 (12)	1983-11-12	Showboat Hotel and Casino, Las Vegas, Nevada, U.S.	
14	Win	13–1	Al Carter	TKO	7 (10)	1983-08-30	Tropicana Hotel & Casino, Atlantic City, New Jersey, U.S.	
13	Win	12–1	Darrell Mitchell	KO	1 (8)	1983-07-29	Ridgewood Grove, Queens, New York, U.S.	
12	Win	11–1	Glenn Burnett	TKO	3 (8)	1983-07-05	Tropicana Hotel & Casino, Atlantic City, New Jersey, U.S.	
11	Win	10–1	Thomas Baker	UD	10 (10)	1983-03-31	Sands Casino, Atlantic City, New Jersey, U.S.	
10	Win	9–1	Al Carter	MD	10 (10)	1983-01-06	Sands Casino, Atlantic City, New Jersey, U.S.	
9	Loss	8–1	Harry Arroyo	SD	10 (10)	1982-10-30	Sands Casino, Atlantic City, New Jersey, U.S.	
8	Win	8–0	Arturo Leon	UD	10 (10)	1982-09-14	Tropicana Hotel & Casino, Atlantic City, New Jersey, U.S.	
7	Win	7–0	Carlos Santana	UD	8 (8)	1982-07-18	Tropicana Hotel & Casino, Atlantic City, New Jersey, U.S.	
6	Win	6–0	Mike Blunt	KO	6 (8)	1982-05-18	Tropicana Hotel & Casino, Atlantic City, New Jersey, U.S.	
5	Win	5–0	James Singleton	TKO	3 (8)	1982-04-20	Tropicana Hotel & Casino, Atlantic City, New Jersey, U.S.	
4	Win	4–0	David Brown	UD	8 (8)	1982-04-02	Sands Casino, Atlantic City, New Jersey, U.S.	
3	Win	3–0	Cedric Barkley	KO	1 (6)	1982-03-16	Tropicana Hotel & Casino, Atlantic City, New Jersey, U.S.	
2	Win	2–0	Terry Butler	TKO	4 (6)	1982-02-09	Tropicana Hotel & Casino, Atlantic City, New Jersey, U.S.	
1	Win	1–0	Maurice Saalakhan	UD	6 (6)	1981-12-26	Bally's Park Place, Atlantic City, New Jersey, U.S.	

== Later life and death ==
Manley converted to Islam after he retired from boxing and adopted the name Bilal Ajani Sekou. In 2008 he filed a $15 million discrimination lawsuit against his employer Consumers Energy.

Manley began to suffer from dementia in his later years and went missing from his care facility in 2017; he was found a few day later. He died in May 2023 in New Orleans.

== See also ==
- Kronk Gym
- List of world light-welterweight boxing champions

Sporting positions
Amateur boxing titles
Previous: Melvin Paul	U.S. lightweight champion 1981	Next: Pernell Whitaker (Spring); Clifford Gray (Winter)
World boxing titles
Preceded by Gary Hinton	IBF light-welterweight champion October 30, 1986 – March 4, 1987	Succeeded by Terry Marsh
