= Mississippi Freelance =

Newspaper

Mississippi Freelance was a liberal monthly newspaper, with the stated mission of "reporting the otherwise unreported." The paper was edited by Lew Powell and Ed Williams, who were working at the time as reporters for the Greenville, Mississippi Delta Democrat Times (under editor Hodding Carter III) and articles were written by volunteer reporters.

== History ==
Editors Powell and Williams explicitly chose not to make Mississippi Freelance an underground publication. In 1969, Powell told a reporter for The Delta Review:

Undergrounds are largely ineffective in changing the political situation because they're so far removed from it. We want Mississippi Freelance to analyze the system, not ignore it... I hope to have a sizable Establishment readership that's concerned with how their tax money is being spent and so forth. You can seek exposes without having to be liberal, conservative, or without touting any other cause. And there's idiocy in government that needs exposing no matter what your political stripe.

The name of the newspaper was chosen to parody an old newspaper, the Mississippi Free Lance, which had been published by former Mississippi governor and U.S. Senator Theodore G. Bilbo, an ardent white supremacist. The Freelance criticized racism and ineptitude in Mississippi politicians, universities, and particularly the state's Mississippi State Sovereignty Commission.

At the time of the paper's founding, Powell and Williams shared a rental house on Washington Avenue in Greenville, which also served as the business and editorial offices for Mississippi Freelance.

Williams told the Delta Review:

As a journalist, I see stories all the time that are just crying to be written. I want a chance to write them, to spend time on them, if necessary.

Powell correctly predicted the longevity of Mississippi Freelance in that interview:

I have some money saved, and I'm single. This is the only time I'll be able to try something like this. We won't expect this thing to go over financially. We'll probably print 12 issues and shut down.

Mississippi Freelance was published from April 1969 to March 1970, with a twelve-issue run and about 700 subscribers in Mississippi and elsewhere. Its first issue in April 1969 included an interview with New York congressman Allard Lowenstein; a humor piece by Williams pointing out that "many of the men on top of Mississippi's power heap" were former cheerleaders; and an exclusive interview by Powell with an officer in the Memphis Invaders, an African American militant group. Four thousand copies of this first issue were mailed to legislators, lawyers, and people on mailing lists prepared by friends.

After the second issue, which included a "provocative piece on Mississippi hippies," Powell left the Delta Democrat Times to focus full-time on Mississippi Freelance.

Mississippi Freelance ceased publication in March 1970.

Curtis Wilkie was the paper's Washington bureau chief.

On October 11, 2016, Mississippi Freelance editors Lew Powell and Ed Williams spoke about the publication at the University of Mississippi in the Meek School of Journalism and New Media.
