= Tongta Kiatvayupakdi =

- Born: Supat Pholcharee (สุพัฒน์ พลชารี); Udon Thani, Thailand
- Nationality: Thai
- Division: Light welterweight Welterweight
- Fighting out of: Bangkok, Thailand
- Team: Muangsurin gym
- Trainer: Sanong Rakwanich
- Years active: 1976–1983

Professional boxing record
- Total: 15
- Wins: 8
- By knockout: 5
- Losses: 7
- By knockout: 6
- Draws: 0
- No contests: 0

Other information
- Boxing record from BoxRec

Tongta Kiatvayupakdi (Thai: ต้องตา เกียรติวายุภักษ์) is a Thai former professional boxer who competed from 1976 to 1983, challenging for the WBA junior welterweight title in 1978.

== Career ==
Tongta was a naturally hard-hitting southpaw who fought at 140 pounds, or light welterweight, a weight class considered relatively large for a Thai boxer. He was therefore backed by Sanong Rakwanich and Thiamboon Intharabut, the manager and promoter of Saensak Muangsurin, who at the time held the WBC light welterweight title and was one of the biggest superstars in boxing.

Because Tongta possessed qualities similar to those of Saensak, they intended to have him follow in Saensak's footsteps: after only a few professional bouts, he would be given a shot at the world title. They even gave him a hairstyle and moustache similar to Saensak's.

He gradually climbed the world rankings, defeating American Jimmy Heair and Indonesia's Wongso Suseno, both ranked No. 7 by the WBA, by decision over 10 rounds.

On April 29, 1978, with a record of just eight bouts and one loss, Tongta, who had very little experience, challenged the highly experienced Colombian world champion Antonio Cervantes for the WBA junior welterweight title in Udon Thani, his hometown. He was stopped by knockout at 2:40 of the sixth round. At the time of the stoppage, he was behind on two of the three judges' scorecards.

After that, however, Tongta suffered more losses than wins. In his final two bouts, he was knocked out by Chung Jae Hwang in South Korea. Their first encounter was for the OPBF welterweight title. Tongta record for 15 fights is 8 wins (5 on knockouts), 7 losses (6 on knockouts).
