= Antonio Cervantes =

Colombian boxer (born 1945)

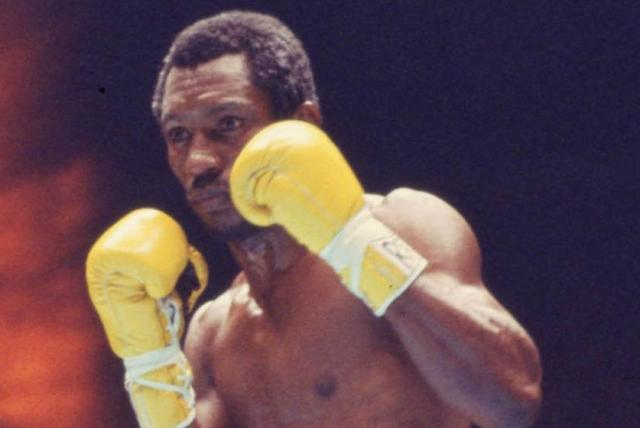

Personal information
- Nicknames: Kid Pambele, Pambe
- Nationality: Colombian
- Born: Antonio Cervantes Reyes; December 23, 1945 (age 80) San Basilio de Palenque, Bolívar, Colombia
- Height: 5 ft 8 1/2 in (174 cm)
- Weight: Light welterweight

Boxing career
- Reach: 72 in (183 cm)
- Stance: Orthodox

Boxing record
- Total fights: 80
- Wins: 67
- Win by KO: 37
- Losses: 12
- Draws: 1

Antonio Cervantes Reyes (born December 23, 1945) is a Colombian boxing trainer and former professional boxer who competed from 1961 to 1983. He held the WBA and The Ring light welterweight title twice between 1972 and 1980.

In 2002, Cervantes was chosen for the Ring Magazine's list of 80 Best Fighters of the Last 80 Years. Boxrec also ranked him the 50th greatest pound for pound boxer of all time.

== Personal life ==
Cervantes, who is Afro-Colombian, was born in Palenque, also known as the first site of a slave rebellion in the Americas. Cervantes used to sell contraband cigarettes and shine shoes as a child to survive.

== Professional boxing career ==
He met boxing trainer Carmelo Prada, who helped shape his style. Cervantes only had three amateur bouts, winning two and losing one. On January 31, 1964, Cervantes entered the boxing ring as a professional for the first time, beating Juan Martínez by decision in six rounds. His first 32 bouts as a professional were in Colombia, and he won 27, lost 4 and drew one of them. Realizing his pupil needed publicity outside Colombia, Prada then moved with Cervantes to Venezuela, where, on November 25, 1968, he knocked out Orlando Ruiz in the first round for his first fight abroad. He followed that win with a ten rounds decision over Nestor Rojas in the very short time of only three days later.

On December 23 of that year, he suffered his first knockout defeat when Cruz Marcano, a fringe contender of the time, beat him in four rounds in Caracas.

He won five and lost two in 1969, splitting his fights between Colombia and Venezuela, and losing a ten-round decision to Antonio Gómez, former world champion.

He won two more in 1970, then he and Prada moved, this time to Los Angeles. In California, he began by beating Jose Rodriguez by a knockout in the first round in San Jose, and on December 17, he beat Rodolfo Gato González, a very famous Mexican boxer of the time, by knockout in round eight. After this and a 1971 win over Argentine Enrique Jana, Cervantes was ranked as a light welterweight by the WBA. On December 11 of that year, he had his first world title try, against Nicolino Locche, in Buenos Aires. Cervantes lost a 15-round decision that time, however.

=== Winning the light welterweight title ===
After winning three fights in 1972, Cervantes, who had by then returned to Colombia, had another world title try: Alfonso Frazer, who had dethroned Locche of the world title, gave Cervantes a chance on October 28 at Panama City. Cervantes knocked Frazer out in round ten and became the world light welterweight champion for the first time.

Cervantes immediately became a national hero in Colombia, and many enterprises made him their spokesman in the coffee producing country, most notably Sanyo, whose name the popular champion advertised on his clothing and fight trunks.

Cervantes made nine defenses, including a TKO in round ten against Locche in their rematch after his corner stopped the fight due to a cut over his left eye, a knockout in five of Frazer, also in a rematch, a 15-round split decision win over Josue Marquez in Puerto Rico (in the first world title bout ever held at Roberto Clemente Coliseum; most of the nine thousand in attendance scored the fight for Cervantes) and a 15-round decision against future world Lightweight champion Esteban De Jesús. But on March 6, 1976, at San Juan, he lost a 15-round decision and the world title to 17-year-old Puerto Rican Wilfred Benítez, who with that became boxing's youngest champion ever.

Cervantes won five more fights in a row, including a win over Saoul Mamby, before fighting for the world title again. After Benitez had left the light welterweight belt vacant, Cervantes regained it on June 25, 1977, with a five-round knockout over Carlos Maria Gimenez, again in Venezuela. His second reign as world champion took him to such places as Thailand, Botswana and South Korea, among others. He retained the title six times, beating the likes of Adrian Marrero and Miguel Montilla (twice). By this time, there was much talk about a superfight with world Lightweight champion Roberto Durán, who was coming up in weight. Duran decided to challenge Sugar Ray Leonard instead, however, and Cervantes vs. Duran never materialized.

On August 2, 1980, Cervantes dropped his next title challenger, Aaron Pryor, to the canvas in the first round. Pryor recovered, however, and beat Cervantes by a knockout in round four. This turned out to be Cervantes' last world title fight. He fought two times more for the FECARBOX WBC title, winning both fights shortly before retiring in 1980.

However, Cervantes came out of retirement due to financial problems and went on boxing until 1983, winning four fights and dropping his last one, a ten-round decision loss to Danny Sanchez on December 9, 1983, at Miami.

== Retirement ==
In retirement, his life was almost as public as it was during his boxing career: In 1985, for example, he and a female passenger in one of the boats Cervantes owned, suffered a water accident, and the passenger almost drowned, but Cervantes was able to save her life. A movie was made about a fictional boxer called Milton Ollivera (who comes from Colombia) who goes through a majority of the things Cervantes went through throughout his life.

Cervantes was inducted into the International Boxing Hall of Fame in 1998, and in 2000, he was declared by the Colombian Boxing Federation and National Association of Professional Boxing as Colombia's Fighter of the Century. For that award, the WBA issued him a special, commemorative belt.

Cervantes' nickname, Kid Pambelé, became almost as famous as Cervantes himself: as a matter of a fact, many fans called him only Pambelé or Pambe (the name of a song by Carlos Vives about him).

== Professional boxing record ==
80 fights	67 wins	12 losses
By knockout	37	2
By decision	30	10
Draws	1	

No.	Result	Record	Opponent	Type	Round, time	Date	Location	Notes
80	Loss	67–12–1	Danny Sanchez	UD	10	9 Dec 1983	Casino Miami, Miami, Florida, U.S.	
79	Win	67–11–1	Sergio Alvarez	TKO	11 (12)	30 Jul 1983	Plaza de toros de Cartagena, Cartagena, Colombia	Retained WBC FECARBOX title
78	Win	66–11–1	Amancio Castro	PTS	12	26 Mar 1983	Plaza de toros de Cartagena, Cartagena, Colombia	Won WBC FECARBOX title
77	Win	65–11–1	Jerome Artis	PTS	10	2 Apr 1982	Cartagena, Colombia	
76	Win	64–11–1	Lennox Blackmoore	KO	9 (10)	4 Dec 1981	Bogota, Colombia	
75	Loss	63–11–1	Aaron Pryor	KO	4 (15)	2 Aug 1980	Riverfront Coliseum, Cincinnati, Ohio, U.S.	Lost WBA and The Ring light welterweight titles
74	Win	63–10–1	Miguel Montilla	TKO	7 (15)	29 Mar 1980	Plaza de toros de Cartagena, Cartagena, Colombia	Retained WBA and The Ring light welterweight titles
73	Win	62–10–1	Kwang Min Kim	SD	15	25 Aug 1979	Jangchung Gymnasium, Seoul, South Korea	Retained WBA and The Ring light welterweight titles
72	Win	61–10–1	Miguel Montilla	UD	15	18 Jan 1979	Madison Square Garden, New York City, New York, U.S.	Retained WBA light welterweight title; Won vacant The Ring light welterweight title
71	Win	60–10–1	Norman Sekgapane	TKO	9 (15)	26 Aug 1978	Mmabatho Stadium, Mmabatho, South Africa	Retained WBA light welterweight title
70	Win	59–10–1	Tongta Kiatvayupakdi	KO	6 (15)	28 Apr 1978	Provincial Stadium, Udon Thani, Thailand	Retained WBA light welterweight title
69	Win	58–10–1	Johnny Copeland	KO	3 (10)	18 Mar 1978	Plaza de toros de Cartagena, Cartagena, Colombia	
68	Win	57–10–1	Adriano Marrero	UD	15	5 Nov 1977	Maestranza César Girón Bullring, Maracay, Venezuela	Retained WBA light welterweight title
67	Win	56–10–1	Carlos Maria Gimenez	RTD	5 (15)	25 Jun 1977	Plaza de toros Monumental de Maracaibo, Maracaibo, Venezuela	Won vacant WBA light welterweight title
66	Win	55–10–1	Adriano Marrero	UD	10	19 Mar 1977	Maestranza César Girón Bullring, Maracay, Venezuela	
65	Win	54–10–1	Saoul Mamby	UD	10	13 Nov 1976	Maestranza César Girón Bullring, Maracay, Venezuela	
64	Win	53–10–1	Ariel Maciel	KO	2 (10)	16 Oct 1976	Maestranza César Girón Bullring, Maracay, Venezuela	
63	Win	52–10–1	Beau Jaynes	KO	1 (10)	17 Jul 1976	Maestranza César Girón Bullring, Maracay, Venezuela	
62	Win	51–10–1	Javier Ayala	KO	1 (10)	23 May 1976	Maestranza César Girón Bullring, Maracay, Venezuela	
61	Loss	50–10–1	Wilfred Benítez	SD	15	6 Mar 1976	Hiram Bithorn Stadium, San Juan, Puerto Rico	Lost WBA and The Ring light welterweight titles
60	Win	50–9–1	Hector Thompson	RTD	7 (15)	15 Nov 1975	Gimnasio Nuevo Panama, Panama City, Panama	Retained WBA and The Ring light welterweight titles
59	Win	49–9–1	Battlehawk Kazama	TKO	6 (10)	20 Sep 1975	Poliedro de Caracas, Caracas, Venezuela	
58	Win	48–9–1	Esteban De Jesus	UD	15	17 May 1975	Gimnasio Nuevo Panama, Panama City, Panama	Retained WBA and The Ring light welterweight titles
57	Win	47–9–1	Ray Chavez Guerrero	KO	2 (10)	15 Mar 1975	Poliedro de Caracas, Caracas, Venezuela	
56	Win	46–9–1	Shinichi Kadota	KO	8 (15)	26 Oct 1974	Nihon University Auditorium, Tokyo, Japan	Retained WBA and The Ring light welterweight titles
55	Win	45–9–1	Victor Ortiz	KO	2 (15)	27 Jul 1974	Plaza de toros de Cartagena, Cartagena, Colombia	Retained WBA and The Ring light welterweight titles
54	Win	44–9–1	Pedro Adigue	KO	4 (10)	8 Jun 1974	Maestranza César Girón Bullring, Maracay, Venezuela	
53	Win	43–9–1	Chang-Kil Lee	KO	6 (15)	2 Mar 1974	Plaza de toros de Cartagena, Cartagena, Colombia	Retained WBA and The Ring light welterweight titles
52	Win	42–9–1	Lion Furuyama	UD	15	5 Dec 1973	Gimnasio Nuevo Panama, Panama City, Panama	Retained WBA and The Ring light welterweight titles
51	Win	41–9–1	Carlos Maria Gimenez	TKO	5 (15)	8 Sep 1973	El Campín Coliseum, Bogota, Colombia	Retained WBA and The Ring light welterweight titles
50	Win	40–9–1	Reinaldo Mercado	TKO	5 (10)	20 Jul 1973	Coliseo Humberto Perea, Barranquilla, Colombia	
49	Win	39–9–1	Alfonso Frazer	TKO	5 (15)	19 May 1973	Gimnasio Nuevo Panama, Panama City, Panama	Retained WBA and The Ring light welterweight titles
48	Win	38–9–1	Benny Huertas	KO	1 (10)	28 Apr 1973	Coliseo El Pueblo, Cali, Colombia	
47	Win	37–9–1	Nicolino Locche	RTD	10 (15)	17 Mar 1973	Maestranza César Girón Bullring, Maracay, Venezuela	Retained WBA and The Ring light welterweight titles
46	Win	36–9–1	Josue Marquez	SD	15	15 Feb 1973	Roberto Clemente Coliseum, San Juan, Puerto Rico	Retained WBA and The Ring light welterweight titles
45	Win	35–9–1	Alfonso Frazer	KO	10 (15)	28 Oct 1972	Gimnasio Nuevo Panama, Panama City, Panama	Won WBA and The Ring light welterweight titles
44	Win	34–9–1	Lupe Ramirez	PTS	10	19 Aug 1972	Maestranza César Girón Bullring, Maracay, Venezuela	
43	Win	33–9–1	Frank Medina	KO	8 (10)	26 Apr 1972	Coliseo Humberto Perea, Barranquilla, Colombia	
42	Win	32–9–1	Jose Escudero	KO	1 (10)	10 Mar 1972	Barranquilla, Colombia	
41	Loss	31–9–1	Nicolino Locche	UD	15	11 Dec 1971	Estadio Luna Park, Buenos Aires, Argentina	For WBA and The Ring light welterweight titles
40	Win	31–8–1	Julio Vera	UD	10	18 Oct 1971	Nuevo Circo de Caracas, Caracas, Venezuela	
39	Win	30–8–1	Gerardo Ferrat	UD	10	10 Jul 1971	Valencia, Venezuela	
38	Win	29–8–1	Lupe Ramirez	UD	10	28 May 1971	Nuevo Circo de Caracas, Caracas, Venezuela	
37	Win	28–8–1	Enrique Jana	TKO	8 (10)	18 Feb 1971	Grand Olympic Auditorium, Los Angeles, California, U.S.	
36	Win	27–8–1	Rodolfo Gonzalez	TKO	8 (10)	17 Dec 1970	Grand Olympic Auditorium, Los Angeles, California, U.S.	
35	Win	26–8–1	Jorge Rodriguez	KO	8 (10)	6 Nov 1970	San Jose Civic, San Jose, California, U.S.	
34	Win	25–8–1	Diego Tovar	KO	1 (10)	23 Mar 1970	Palacio de Deportes, Caracas, Venezuela	
33	Win	24–8–1	Pedro Chirinos	PTS	10	20 Feb 1970	Caracas, Venezuela	
32	Loss	23–8–1	Antonio Gómez	PTS	10	10 Nov 1969	Nuevo Circo de Caracas, Caracas, Venezuela	
31	Win	23–7–1	Orlando Rivas	KO	2 (10)	15 Aug 1969	Nuevo Circo de Caracas, Caracas, Venezuela	
30	Loss	22–7–1	Francisco Bolivar	PTS	10	21 Jul 1969	Caracas, Venezuela	
29	Win	22–6–1	Milton Mendez	PTS	10	4 Jun 1969	Teatro Circo, Cartagena, Colombia	
28	Win	21–6–1	Frank Leroy	KO	2 (10)	15 Apr 1969	Caracas, Venezuela	
27	Win	20–6–1	Jesus Gonzalez	TKO	2 (10)	9 Feb 1969	Estadio Once de Noviembre, Cartagena, Colombia	
26	Loss	19–6–1	Cruz Marcano	KO	4 (10)	20 Dec 1968	Nuevo Circo de Caracas, Caracas, Venezuela	
25	Win	19–5–1	Orlando Ruiz	KO	1(10)	25 Nov 1968	Nuevo Circo de Caracas, Caracas, Venezuela	
24	Win	18–5–1	Jose Godoy	PTS	8	31 Aug 1968	Canal 7 TV Studio, Bogota, Colombia	
23	Win	17–5–1	Heliodoro Pitalua	PTS	10	21 Jan 1968	Estadio Once de Noviembre, Cartagena, Colombia	
22	Win	16–5–1	Rafa Rojas	KO	5 (10)	5 Aug 1967	Coliseo Humberto Perea, Barranquilla, Colombia	
21	Loss	15–5–1	Nestor Rojas	PTS	8	19 Jun 1967	Nuevo Circo de Caracas, Caracas, Venezuela	
20	Win	15–4–1	Reynaldo Lopez	PTS	10	3 Jun 1967	San Andres, Colombia	
19	Win	14–4–1	Heliodoro Pitalua	PTS	10	20 May 1967	San Andres, Colombia	
18	Loss	13–4–1	Heliodoro Pitalua	PTS	8	2 Apr 1967	Estadio Once de Noviembre, Cartagena, Colombia	
17	Loss	13–3–1	Victor Cano	PTS	8	3 Feb 1967	Plaza de Toros de Santamaría, Bogotá, Colombia	
16	Loss	13–2–1	Cipriano Zuluaga	PTS	10	6 Nov 1966	Dieciocho de Junio stadium, Monteria, Colombia	
15	Loss	13–1–1	Cipriano Zuluaga	PTS	10	23 Sep 1966	Dieciocho de Junio stadium, Monteria, Colombia	
14	Draw	13–0–1	Reynaldo Lopez	PTS	8	29 Jul 1966	Estadio Once de Noviembre, Cartagena, Colombia	
13	Win	13–0	Jose Zuniga	PTS	6	24 Jun 1966	Estadio Once de Noviembre, Cartagena, Colombia	
12	Win	12–0	Jose Godoy	PTS	6	24 May 1966	Calamar, Colombia	
11	Win	11–0	Jesus Cardenas	KO	7 (8)	10 May 1966	Turbaco, Colombia	
10	Win	10–0	Jose Godoy	PTS	6	29 Apr 1966	Estadio Once de Noviembre, Cartagena, Colombia	
9	Win	9–0	Antonio Yi	PTS	6	19 Mar 1966	Estadio Once de Noviembre, Cartagena, Colombia	
8	Win	8–0	Rafael Donodo	KO	2 (6)	19 Jan 1966	Estadio Once de Noviembre, Cartagena, Colombia	
7	Win	7–0	Antonio Yi	PTS	6	2 Oct 1965	Humberto Perea Coliseum, Barranquilla, Colombia	
6	Win	6–0	Felix Salgado	PTS	4	20 Jun 1964	Barranquilla, Colombia	
5	Win	5–0	Oscar Gonzalez	PTS	8	5 May 1964	Medellín, Colombia	
4	Win	4–0	Rodolfo Marquez	KO	3 (6)	21 Apr 1964	María La Baja, Colombia	
3	Win	3–0	Rodolfo Marquez	PTS	6	20 Mar 1964	Valledupar, Colombia	
2	Win	2–0	Rodolfo Marquez	PTS	4	28 Feb 1964	Valledupar, Colombia	
1	Win	1–0	Juan Martinez	PTS	6	31 Jan 1964	Cerete, Colombia	

== See also ==
- List of world light-welterweight boxing champions

Sporting positions
World boxing titles
Preceded by Alfonso Frazer	WBA light welterweight champion 28 October 1972 – 6 March 1976	Succeeded by Wilfred Benítez
Preceded by Alfonso Frazer	The Ring light welterweight champion 28 October 1972 - 6 March 1976	Succeeded by Wilfred Benítez
Vacant Title last held by Wilfred Benítez	WBA light welterweight champion 25 June 1977 – 2 August 1980	Succeeded by Aaron Pryor
Vacant Title last held by Wilfred Benítez	The Ring light welterweight champion 18 January 1979 – 2 August 1980	Succeeded by Aaron Pryor
