= Bobby Joe Young =

American boxer

Bobby Joe Young (born March 4, 1959) is a former boxer from Steubenville, Ohio. Young is best known as the only man to have a professional win over Aaron Pryor.

== Amateur career ==
Young had a solid amateur career, and allegedly lost two close fights in the amateurs to Thomas Hearns.

== Professional career ==
Young turned professional in 1980 amidst high expectations, and lost his first bout to Pedro Vilella in the Felt Forum.

In 1987 he dealt Pryor his lone loss, by a technical knockout in the seventh round.

In 1989, Young got his first and only title shot, against Simon Brown for the IBF welterweight title. Young was knocked out in the 2nd round.

He retired after the loss with 31 wins, 7 losses and 23 wins by knockout.

At one point, Young was considered one of the welterweights of the future, along with Milton McCrory, Donald Curry, and Marlon Starling.

Bobby Joe Young now works at Curtis High School in New York City.
