= Emilio Villa (boxer) =

Colombian boxer

Personal information
- Full name: Emiliano Villa
- Nationality: Colombian
- Born: 13 January 1953 (age 72); Barranquilla, Colombia

Sport
- Sport: Boxing

Emilio "Emilliano" Villa (born 13 January 1953) is a Colombian boxer. He competed in the men's light welterweight event at the 1972 Summer Olympics.
