= Curtis Wilkie =

American journalist

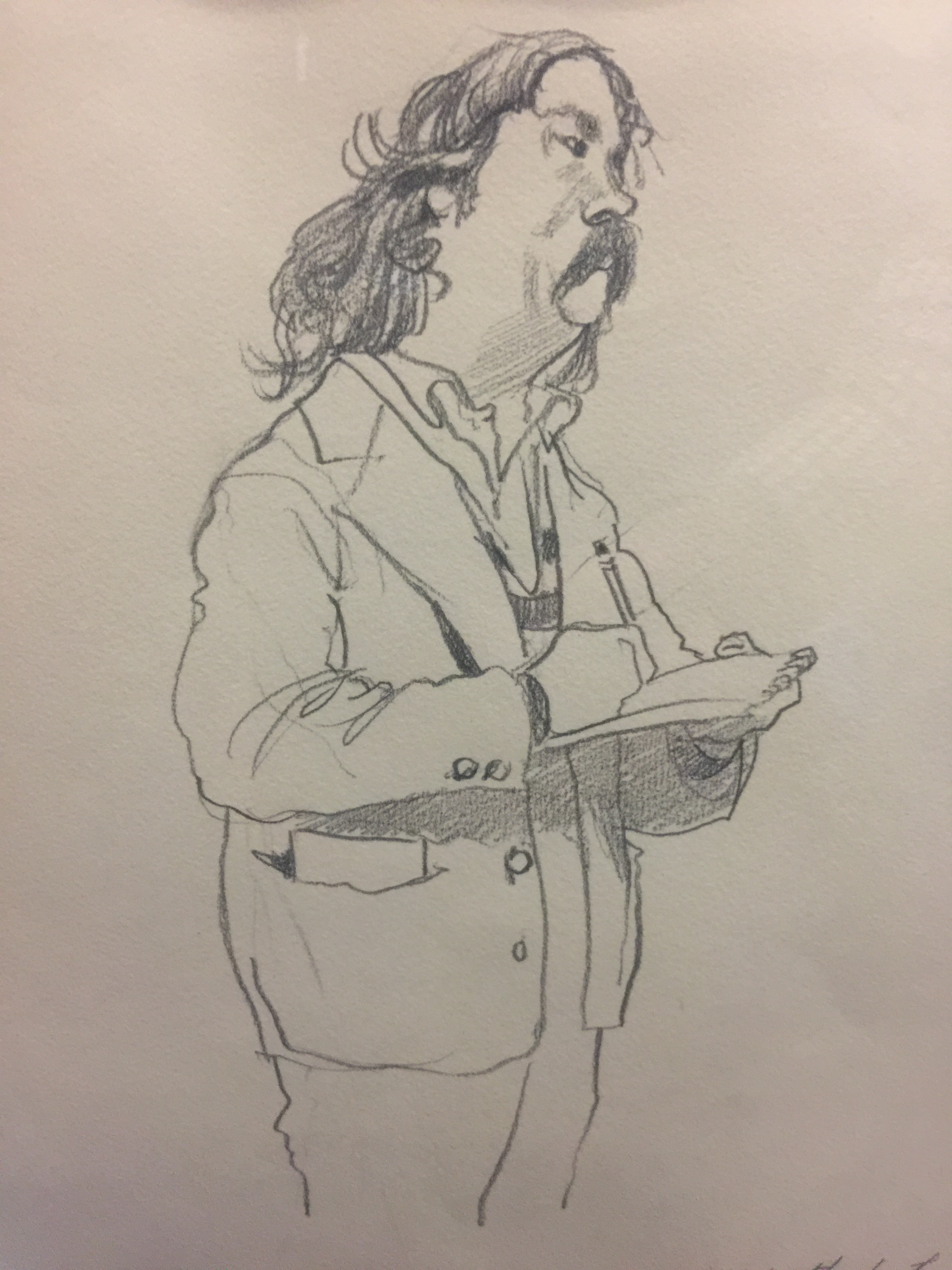
- Pencil drawing of Curtis Wilkie by David Levine (1980)
- Born: September 20, 1940 (age 86); Greenville, Mississippi, U.S.
- Education: University of Mississippi
- Occupations: former reporter for the Boston Globe, retired professor of journalism at the University of Mississippi
- Children: Carter, Leighton McCool, Stuart (deceased)

Curtis Wilkie (born September 20, 1940) is a retired newspaper reporter, college professor and historian of the American South. He is the author of numerous books including When Evil Lived in Laurel: The White Knights and the Murder of Vernon Dahmer, and Dixie: A Personal Odyssey Through Events That Shaped the Modern South. Historian Douglas Brinkley wrote that, "Over the past four decades no reporter has critiqued the American South with such evocative sensitivity and bedrock honesty as Curtis Wilkie."

== Early life ==
Wilkie was born in Greenville, Mississippi in 1940, to parents whose families had settled Lafayette County, Mississippi and Yalobusha County in 1837. During World War II, he lived at Oak Ridge, Tennessee, where his parents worked as civilians in the Manhattan Project.

After his father died in a fire in 1947, he spent the majority of his childhood in Summit, Mississippi, where his mother was a schoolteacher and his stepfather was the town's Presbyterian minister. His parents advocated for the racial integration of their church in 1971, at a time when many white Christians in Mississippi were leaving mainline Protestant denominations and public school systems to avoid integration. He graduated from Corinth High School in 1958 and from the University of Mississippi in 1963 with a bachelor's degree in journalism, where he was a member of Sigma Alpha Epsilon fraternity.

== Career ==
While at the University of Mississippi, Wilkie witnessed the discrimination against the first African-American students to enroll, and thereafter became involved in liberal political causes. From 1963 to 1969, at a time when the civil rights movement was at its height in the Mississippi Delta, he worked as a reporter and editor at the Clarksdale Press Register. In 1968, he was a member of the first racially integrated delegation to represent Mississippi at a Democratic National Convention, unseating segregationist state party leaders disqualified for violation of party rules. The insurgent delegation of "Loyal Democrats of Mississippi" was co-chaired by his friends Aaron Henry, head of the NAACP in Mississippi, and journalist Hodding Carter III.

In 1969, Wilkie received a Congressional Fellowship from the American Political Science Association to work in Washington, D.C. as an aide to Sen. Walter F. Mondale (D-Minn.) and Rep. John Brademas (D-Ind,) from 1969 to 1971. In 1972, as a reporter at The News Journal in Wilmington, Delaware, he covered the first of eight presidential campaigns he would follow during his career.

He was featured in The Boys on the Bus, Timothy Crouse's account of the journalists who covered the 1972 election battle between Richard Nixon and George McGovern. Upon moving to Delaware and discovering a racially restrictive covenant on the house he was purchasing, he worked with the neighborhood association's president to remove the covenants from Wilmington's Wawaset Park neighborhood.

He joined The Boston Globe in 1975 and served as a national and foreign correspondent for the paper for the next 26 years. He was the Globe's White House correspondent from 1977 to 1982 and also served for a time as its Washington bureau chief. In the mid-1980s, he served as Middle East bureau chief for the Globe and covered the 1982 Israeli invasion of Lebanon, the 1983 bombing of the US Marines barracks in Beirut, the first Palestinian intifada, and the first Gulf War. On Christmas Day 1989, he was with a small group of journalists who came under fire in Timișoara, Romania, while covering fighting between revolutionaries and forces loyal to Nicolae Ceausescu, the deposed president. In 1993, Wilkie established the Globe’s Southern bureau in New Orleans, where he lived in the French Quarter. He retired from the Globe in 2001.

In 2004, Wilkie's friend since childhood, attorney James P. "Butch" Cothren of Jackson, convinced him to return to his home state and teach journalism at the University of Mississippi. From 2007 until his retirement in 2020, Wilkie was a professor and Fellow at the Overby Center for Journalism & Politics. In 2013, Cothren endowed a scholarship for Ole Miss journalism students in Wilkie's name.

The Fellowship of Southern Writers presented Wilkie with its Special Award for Excellence in Non-Fiction Writing in 2005. From 2008 to 2010, Wilkie spent two years researching court records and conducting some 200 personal interviews for his book, The Fall of the House of Zeus: The Rise and Ruin of America's Most Powerful Trial Lawyer, his portrayal of Richard F. "Dickie" Scruggs, the famed trial lawyer and brother-in-law of former U.S. Senate Majority Leader Trent Lott. In the 1990s, Scruggs was a lead attorney in the tobacco litigation which was settled for $248 billion. He was portrayed by actor Colm Feore in the movie The Insider. Scruggs also successfully sued the asbestos industry, the makers of Ritalin, and insurers in the aftermath of Hurricane Katrina.

Wilkie appeared often on panel discussions related to Southern politics, journalism, literature and the Civil Rights struggle in Mississippi. He is known for his distinctive bullfrog voice — a deep, slow Mississippi drawl, which has been described as "the sound of marbles rolling around in a bucket of Delta mud."

== Books ==
- When Evil Lived in Laurel: The White Knights and the Murder of Vernon Dahmer (2020) ISBN 978-1324005759
- (co-author with Thomas Oliphant) The Road to Camelot: Inside JFK's Five-year Campaign (2017) ISBN 9781501105562
- Assassins, Eccentrics, Politicians, and Other Persons of Interest: Fifty Pieces from the Road (2014) ISBN 978-1628461268
- The Fall of the House of Zeus: The Rise and Ruin of America's Most Powerful Trial Lawyer (2010) (2013) ISBN 978-0307460707
- Dixie: A Personal Odyssey Through Events That Shaped the Modern South (2001) ISBN 978-0684872858
- (co-author with Jim McDougall) Arkansas Mischief: The Birth of a National Scandal (1998) ISBN 978-0805058086

== Other writings by Curtis Wilkie ==
- "The South’s Lesson for the Tea Party", The New York Times, August 12, 2014
- "The Last Southern Gentleman: Thad Cochran and the lost art of being nice", Politico.com, June 24, 2014
- "Willie Morris: The Prankster", The Southerner, Vol. 1 No. 3, 1999.
- "Bohemia's Last Frontier: New Orleans, a city full of idiosyncrasies, must be restored for the benefit of the nation as a whole". The Nation, October 3, 2005. (Requires subscriber log-in).
