= Boxing at the 1960 Summer Olympics – Lightweight =

Olympic boxing tournament

Lightweight boxing at the Games of the XVII Olympiad
- Venue: Palazzo dello Sport
- Dates: 25 August – 5 September 1960
- Competitors: 34 from 34 nations

Medalists
1st place, gold medalist(s)		Kazimierz Paździor	Poland
2nd place, silver medalist(s)		Sandro Lopopolo	Italy
3rd place, bronze medalist(s)		Richard McTaggart	Great Britain
3rd place, bronze medalist(s)		Abel Laudonio	Argentina

The men's lightweight event was part of the boxing programme at the 1960 Summer Olympics. The weight class allowed boxers of up to 60 kilograms to compete. The competition was held from 25 August to 5 September 1960. 34 boxers from 4 nations competed.

== Competition format ==
The competition was a single-elimination tournament, with no bronze medal match (two bronze medals were awarded, one to each semifinal loser).

== Results ==
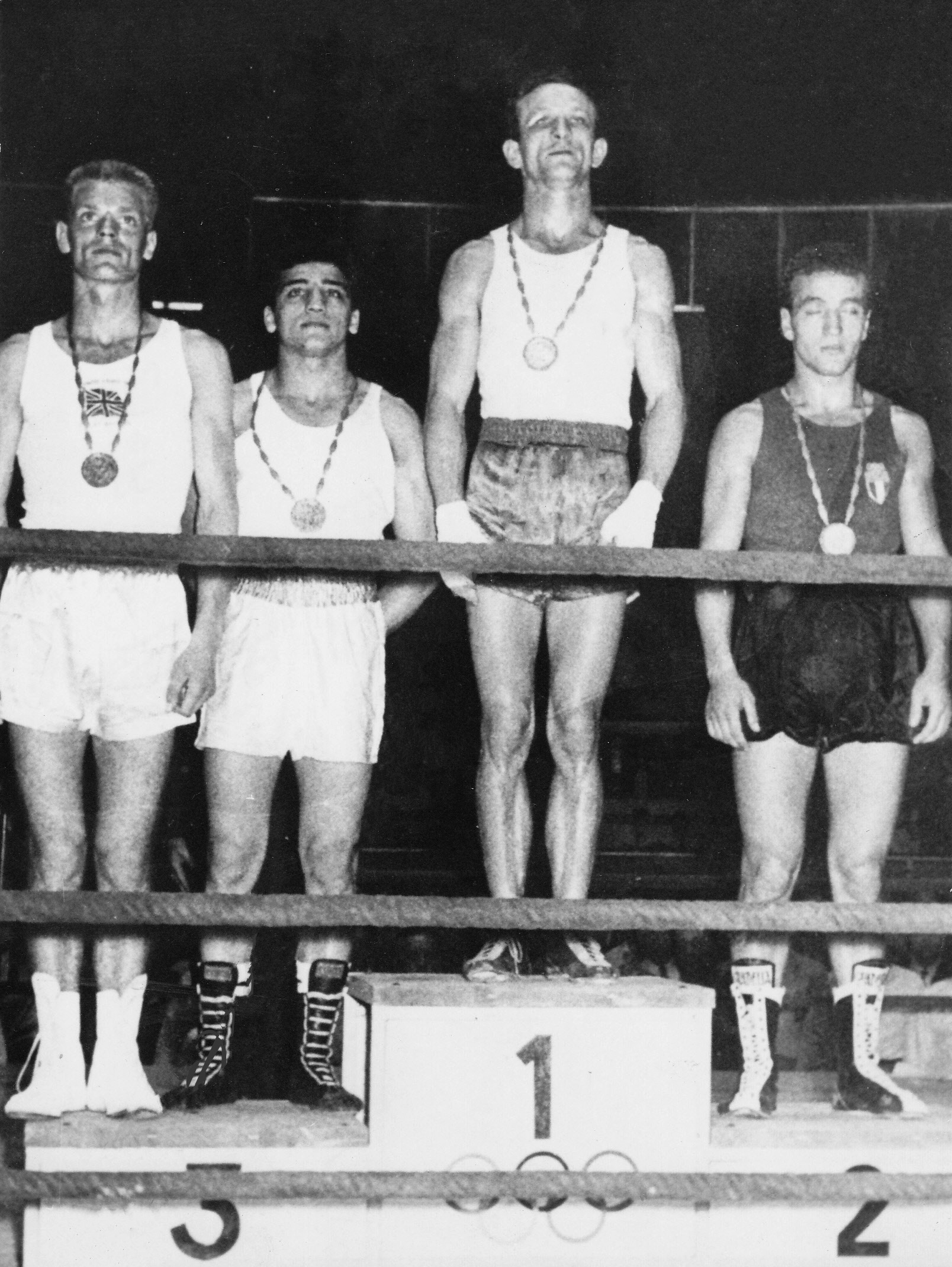
Left-right: Richard McTaggart, Abel Laudonio, Kazimierz Paździor, Sandro Lopopolo

Results of the lightweight boxing competition.

=== Top half ===
Round of 32
Richard McTaggart (GBR)	5
Bhodi Sooknoi (THA)	0
Gualberto Gutiérrez (URU)	1
Eddie Blay (GHA)	4
Ferenc Kellner (HUN)	3
Jacques Cotot (FRA)	2
Yasuyuki Ito (JPN)	5
Abdel Kader Gangani (MAR)	0
Noureddine Dziri (TUN)	L
Harry Lempio (EUA)	KO-3
Taha Abdul Karim (IRQ)	0
Kazimierz Paździor (POL)	5
Ghulam Sarwar (PAK)	1
Adalberto Hernández (MEX)	4
Josef Grumser (AUT)	0
Salah Shokweir (UAR)	5

Round of 16
Richard McTaggart (GBR)	5
Eddie Blay (GHA)	0
Ferenc Kellner (HUN)	5
Yasuyuki Ito (JPN)	0
Harry Lempio (EUA)	1
Kazimierz Paździor (POL)	4
Adalberto Hernández (MEX)	2
Salah Shokweir (UAR)	3

Quarterfinals
Richard McTaggart (GBR)	3
Ferenc Kellner (HUN)	2
Kazimierz Paździor (POL)	5
Salah Shokweir (UAR)	0

Semifinals
Richard McTaggart (GBR)	2
Kazimierz Paździor (POL)	3

=== Bottom half ===
Round of 64
Sid Prior (AUS)	0
Stoffel Steyn (RSA)	5
Sandro Lopopolo (ITA)	5
Johnny Bolang (INA)	0

Round of 32
Wim Gerlach (NED)	0
Vilikton Barannikov (URS)	5
Väinö Järvenpää (FIN)	2
Iosif Mihalic (ROU)	3
Fernando Riera (ESP)	0
Dagfinn Ness (NOR)	5
Abel Laudonio (ARG)	5
Jozef Töre (TCH)	0
Harry Campbell (USA)	4
Mario Romero (VEN)	1
Dimitar Stoilov (BUL)	1
Lee Gwang-ju (KOR)	4
Esteban Aguilera (CUB)	0
Danny O'Brien (IRL)	5
Stoffel Steyn (RSA)	0
Sandro Lopopolo (ITA)	5

Round of 16
Vilikton Barannikov (URS)	5
Iosif Mihalic (ROU)	0
Dagfinn Ness (NOR)	L
Abel Laudonio (ARG)	KO-1
Harry Campbell (USA)	KO-2
Lee Gwang-ju (KOR)	0
Danny O'Brien (IRL)	0
Sandro Lopopolo (ITA)	5

Quarter-finals
Vilikton Barannikov (URS)	0
Abel Laudonio (ARG)	5
Harry Campbell (USA)	1
Sandro Lopopolo (ITA)	4

Semi-finals
Abel Laudonio (ARG)	2
Sandro Lopopolo (ITA)	3

=== Finals ===
Semifinals
Richard McTaggart (GBR)	2
Kazimierz Paździor (POL)	3
Abel Laudonio (ARG)	2
Sandro Lopopolo (ITA)	3

Final
Kazimierz Paździor (POL)	4
Sandro Lopopolo (ITA)	1
