= Boxing at the 1956 Summer Olympics – Flyweight =

Olympic boxing tournament

Flyweight boxing at the Games of the XVI Olympiad
- Venue: West Melbourne Stadium
- Dates: 23 November – 1 December 1956
- Competitors: 19 from 19 nations

Medalists
1st place, gold medalist(s)		Terence Spinks	Great Britain
2nd place, silver medalist(s)		Mircea Dobrescu	Romania
3rd place, bronze medalist(s)		John Caldwell	Ireland
3rd place, bronze medalist(s)		René Libeer	France

The men's flyweight event was part of the boxing programme at the 1956 Summer Olympics. The weight class was the lightest contested, and allowed boxers of up to 51 kilograms to compete. The competition was held from 23 November to 1 December 1956. 19 boxers from 19 nations competed.

== Medalists ==
Gold	Terence Spinks; Great Britain
Silver	Mircea Dobrescu; Romania
Bronze	John Caldwell; Ireland
Bronze	René Libeer; France

== Results ==
=== First round ===
- Vladimir Stolnikov (URS) def. Edgar Basel (FRG), on points
- Terence Spinks (GBR) def. Samuel Harris (PAK), on points
- Abel Laudonio (ARG) def. Albert Ludick (RSA), on points

=== Second round ===
- Mircea Dobrescu (ROU) def. Federico Bonus (PHI), on points
- Ray Perez (USA) def. František Majdloch (CZE), on points
- John Caldwell (IRL) def. Yai Shwe (BUR), referee stopped the contest (3rd round)
- Warner Batchelor (AUS) def. Henryk Kukier (POL), on points
- Kenji Yonekura (JPN) def. Phajol Muangson (THA), on points
- René Libeer (FRA) def. Pyo Hyeon-gi (KOR), on points
- Vladimir Stolnikov (URS) def. Salvatore Burruni (ITA), on points
- Terence Spinks (GBR) def. Abel Laudonio (ARG), on points

=== Quarterfinals ===
- Mircea Dobrescu (ROU) def. Ray Perez (USA), on points
- John Caldwell (IRL) def. Warner Batchelor (AUS), on points
- René Libeer (FRA) def. Kenji Yonekura (JPN), on points
- Terence Spinks (GBR) def. Vladimir Stolnikov (URS), on points

=== Semifinals ===
- Mircea Dobrescu (ROU) def. John Caldwell (IRL), on points
- Terence Spinks (GBR) def. René Libeer (FRA), on points

=== Final ===
- Terence Spinks (GBR) def. Mircea Dobrescu (ROU), on points
