= Boxing at the 1960 Summer Olympics – Flyweight =

Olympic boxing tournament

Flyweight boxing at the Games of the XVII Olympiad
- Venue: Palazzo dello Sport
- Dates: 25 August – 5 September 1960
- Competitors: 33 from 33 nations

Medalists
1st place, gold medalist(s)		Gyula Török	Hungary
2nd place, silver medalist(s)		Sergey Sivko	Soviet Union
3rd place, bronze medalist(s)		Abdel Moneim El-Guindi	Egypt
3rd place, bronze medalist(s)		Kiyoshi Tanabe	Japan

The men's flyweight event was part of the boxing programme at the 1960 Summer Olympics. The weight class was the lightest contested, and allowed boxers of up to 51 kilograms to compete. The competition was held from 25 August to 5 September 1960. 33 boxers from 33 nations competed.

== Competition format ==
The competition was a straight single-elimination tournament, with no bronze medal match (two bronze medals were awarded, one to each semifinal loser). With 33 boxers competing, there was only one bout in the round of 64.

== Results ==
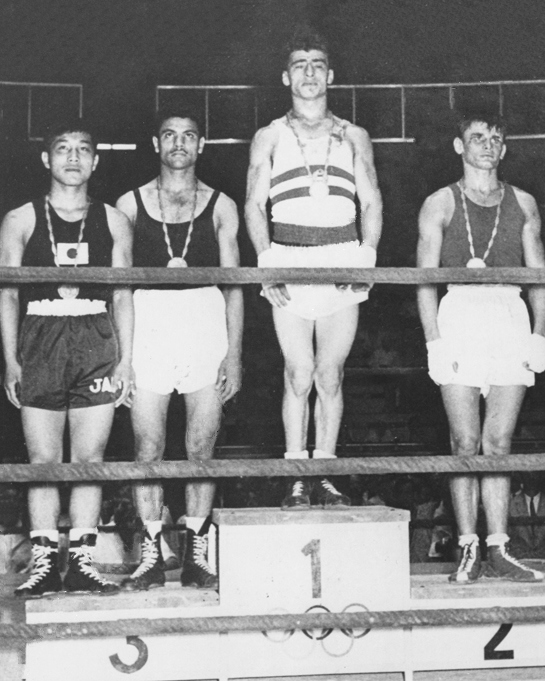
Left-right:Kiyoshi Tanabe, Abdel Moneim El-Guindi, Gyula Török, Sergei Sivko

Results of the flyweight boxing competition.

=== Top half ===
Round of 32
Mircea Dobrescu (ROU)	5
José Martins (BRA)	0
Paul Chervet (SUI)	5
Kicha Poonphol (THA)	0
Karimu Young (NGR)	3
Adam McLean (IRL)	1
Kiyoshi Tanabe (JPN)	5
Isaac Aryee (GHA)	0
Henryk Kukier (POL)	0
Manfred Homberg (EUA)	5
Danny Lee (GBR)	5
Salek Mahju (INA)	0
Jeong Sin-jo (KOR)	0
Sergey Sivko (URS)	5
Antoine Porcel (FRA)	5
Ralph Knoesen (RSA)	0

Round of 16
Mircea Dobrescu (ROU)	KO-1
Paul Chervet (SUI)	L
Karimu Young (NGR)	1
Kiyoshi Tanabe (JPN)	4
Manfred Homberg (EUA)	4
Danny Lee (GBR)	1
Sergey Sivko (URS)	W
Antoine Porcel (FRA)	DQ-3

Quarterfinals
Mircea Dobrescu (ROU)	1
Kiyoshi Tanabe (JPN)	4
Manfred Homberg (EUA)	0
Sergey Sivko (URS)	4

Semifinals
Kiyoshi Tanabe (JPN)	1
Sergey Sivko (URS)	4

=== Bottom half ===
Round of 64
Paolo Curcetti (ITA)	5
Frank Kisekka (UGA)	0

Round of 32
Ezrael Illkhanouf (IRI)	4
James Badrian (RHO)	1
Segundo Macalalad (PHI)	2
Miguel Ángel Botta (ARG)	3
Abdel Kader Belghiti (MAR)	0
Rocky Gattellari (AUS)	5
Eusebio Mesa (ESP)	L
Gyula Török (HUN)	KO-1
Humberto Barrera (USA)	4
Villy Bækgaard Andersen (DEN)	0
Hla Nyunt (BIR)	4
Börje Karvonen (FIN)	1
Abdel Moneim El-Gindy (EGY)	5
Roby Rausch (LUX)	0
Jo Horny (BEL)	0
Paolo Curcetti (ITA)	5

Round of 16
Ezrael Illkhanouf (IRI)	L
Miguel Ángel Botta (ARG)	WO
Rocky Gattellari (AUS)	0
Gyula Török (HUN)	3
Humberto Barrera (USA)	3
Hla Nyunt (BIR)	2
Abdel Moneim El-Gindy (EGY)	4
Paolo Curcetti (ITA)	1

Quarter-finals
Miguel Ángel Botta (ARG)	0
Gyula Török (HUN)	5
Humberto Barrera (USA)	1
Abdel Moneim El-Gindy (EGY)	4

Semi-finals
Gyula Török (HUN)	4
Abdel Moneim El-Gindy (EGY)	0

=== Finals ===
Semifinals
Kiyoshi Tanabe (JPN)	1
Sergey Sivko (URS)	4
Gyula Török (HUN)	4
Abdel Moneim El-Gindy (EGY)	0

Final
Sergey Sivko (URS)	2
Gyula Török (HUN)	3
