= Curcetti =

Curcetti is an Italian surname. Notable people with the surname include:

- Gaetano Curcetti (born 1947), Italian boxer
- Paolo Curcetti (1936–2020), Italian boxer, brother of Gaetano
