= Samuel Harris (boxer) =

Pakistani boxer (born 1934)

Personal information
- Full name: Andrew Samuel Henry Bertram Harris
- Nationality: Pakistani
- Born: 1 May 1934 (age 91) Karachi, Bombay Presidency, British India
- Died: 2008/10/17 London, United Kingdom

Sport
- Sport: Boxing

Samuel Harris (born 1 May 1934) is a Pakistani former boxer. He competed in the men's flyweight event at the 1956 Summer Olympics. At the 1956 Summer Olympics, he lost in his first bout of the tournament to the eventual gold medalist Terence Spinks of Great Britain.
