= Mario Romero (Venezuelan boxer) =

Venezuelan boxer

Personal information
- Born: 15 August 1938 (age 87) Maracay, Venezuela

Sport
- Sport: Boxing
Medal record
Men's amateur boxing
Representing Venezuela
Pan American Games
Bronze medal – third place	1959 Chicago	Lightweight

Mario Romero (born 15 August 1938) is a Venezuelan boxer. He competed in the men's lightweight event at the 1960 Summer Olympics. At the 1960 Summer Olympics, he lost to Harry Campbell of the United States.
