= Warner Batchelor =

Australian boxer (1934–2016)

Personal information
- Nationality: Australian
- Born: 15 October 1934 Wynnum, Queensland, Australia
- Died: 11 February 2016 (aged 81)

Sport
- Sport: Boxing
Medal record
Boxing
Representing Australia
British Empire (and Commonwealth) Games
Bronze medal – third place	1954 Vancouver	Men's Flyweight

Warner Batchelor (15 October 1934 – 11 February 2016) was an Australian boxer. He competed in the men's flyweight event at the 1956 Summer Olympics. In his first fight, he defeated Henryk Kukier of Poland, before losing to John Caldwell of Ireland in his next bout.
