= Terry Spinks =

English boxer

Terry Spinks MBE

Personal information
- Nickname: The Golden Boy
- Nationality: British
- Born: Terence Spinks; 28 February 1938 West Ham, England
- Died: 26 April 2012 (aged 74) Essex, England
- Weight: Featherweight

Boxing career
- Stance: orthodox

Boxing record
- Total fights: 56
- Wins: 45
- Win by KO: 13
- Losses: 3
- Draws: 1
- No contests: 0

Olympic medal record

Men's Boxing
Gold medal – first place	1956 Melbourne	Flyweight

Terence George Spinks MBE (28 February 1938 – 26 April 2012) was an English boxer, who won the gold medal in the flyweight division (– 51 kg) at the 1956 Summer Olympics in Melbourne, Australia. In the final he defeated Mircea Dobrescu of Romania on points. He was also British featherweight champion from 1960 to 1961.

== Amateur career ==
Spinks had 200 amateur fights, and was the 1956 ABA flyweight champion.

=== 1956 Olympic results ===
- Round of 32: Defeated Samuel Harris (Pakistan) on points
- Round of 16: Defeated Abel Laudonio (Argentina) on points
- Quarterfinal: Defeated Vladimir Stolnikov (Soviet Union) on points
- Semifinal: Defeated René Libeer (France) on points
- Final: Defeated Mircea Dobrescu (Romania) on points (won gold medal)

== Pro career ==
Spinks had 49 professional bouts of which he won 41.

He had his first professional bout in April 1957, against Jim Loughrey, at Harringay Arena, winning on a stoppage for a cut eye.

In September 1960, Spinks fought for the British featherweight title, against the holder Bobby Neill. The fight was at the Royal Albert Hall, and Spinks won the title when the fight was stopped in the seventh due to cuts suffered by Neil. In November 1960, the two men had a re-match at the Empire Pool, Wembley. Spinks retained his new title by knocking Neill down three times in the fourteenth, with him finally being counted out. In May 1961, Spinks defended his title for the second time, against the Welshman, Howard Winstone. The fight was at the Empire Pool, and Winstone won by a technical knockout in the tenth round.

After losing his title, Spinks continued fighting, but never challenged for a title again. He had his last fight in December 1962 against Johnny Mantle, winning by a technical knockout in the eighth. After his boxing career ended Spinks became a trainer, coaching the South Korean team at the 1972 Olympics in Munich. He witnessed the Black September terrorists approaching the Israeli quarters before the Munich massacre and raised the alarm.

== After boxing ==
After his boxing career ended, Spinks life took a turn for the worse. He became seriously ill, became a heavy drinker and, in his own words, was living "like a tramp". He was taken in by his cousin in Chadwell Heath where he lived for 19 years until his death.

== Honours ==
He was awarded the MBE in the 2002 New Years Honours List.

== Death ==
Spinks died at his home in Essex on 26 April 2012, after a long illness. More than 200 ex-boxers, including Bobby Neill and several more of Terry's former opponents, attended his funeral at East London Cemetery. Author and sports historian Norman Giller, his long-time friend, said in the eulogy: "Terry hung up his gloves in 1962 but we have never hung up our memories of one of the most accomplished fighters to come out of the East End boxing factory."

== See also ==
- List of British featherweight boxing champions
