= Harry Lempio =

German boxer

Personal information
- Nationality: German
- Born: 13 July 1932; Goldap, Germany
- Died: 26 August 2007 (aged 75); Jelenia Góra, Poland

Sport
- Sport: Boxing

Harry Lempio (13 July 1932 – 26 August 2007) was a German boxer. He competed in the men's lightweight event at the 1960 Summer Olympics. At the 1960 Summer Olympics, he defeated Noureddine Dziri of Tunisia, before losing to Kazimierz Paździor of Poland.
