= Adalberto Hernández =

Mexican boxer (born 1938)

Personal information
- Born: 27 July 1938 (age 86); Mexico City, Mexico

Sport
- Sport: Boxing

Adalberto Hernández (born 27 June 1938) is a Mexican boxer who competed in the men's lightweight event at the 1960 Summer Olympics. At the 1960 Summer Olympics, he defeated Ghulam Sarwar of Pakistan, before losing to Salah Shokweir of the United Arab Republic.
