= Ludick =

Ludick is a surname. Notable people with the surname include:

- Adriaan Ludick (born 1998), Namibian rugby union player
- Albert Ludick (born 1939), South African boxer
- Eddie Ludick (born 1999), South African rugby union player
- Lodewijck van Ludick (1629–1724), landscape painter from the Northern Netherlands
- Ruan Ludick (born 1994), Namibian rugby union player
- Stefan Ludick (born 1981), Namibian musician, television personality, and actor from Windhoek City
- Willem Ludick (born 1997), South African cricketer who has played domestic cricket in New Zealand
- Willie Ludick (1941–2003), South African boxer
