= Ralph Knoesen =

South African boxer

Personal information
- Nationality: South African
- Born: 26 August 1941; Pietermaritzburg, South Africa
- Died: 8 September 2005 (aged 64); Durban, South Africa

Sport
- Sport: Boxing

Ralph Knoesen (26 August 1941 – 8 September 2005) was a South African boxer. He competed in the men's flyweight event at the 1960 Summer Olympics. At the 1960 Summer Olympics, he lost to Antoine Porcel of France in the Round of 32.
