= Yasuyuki =

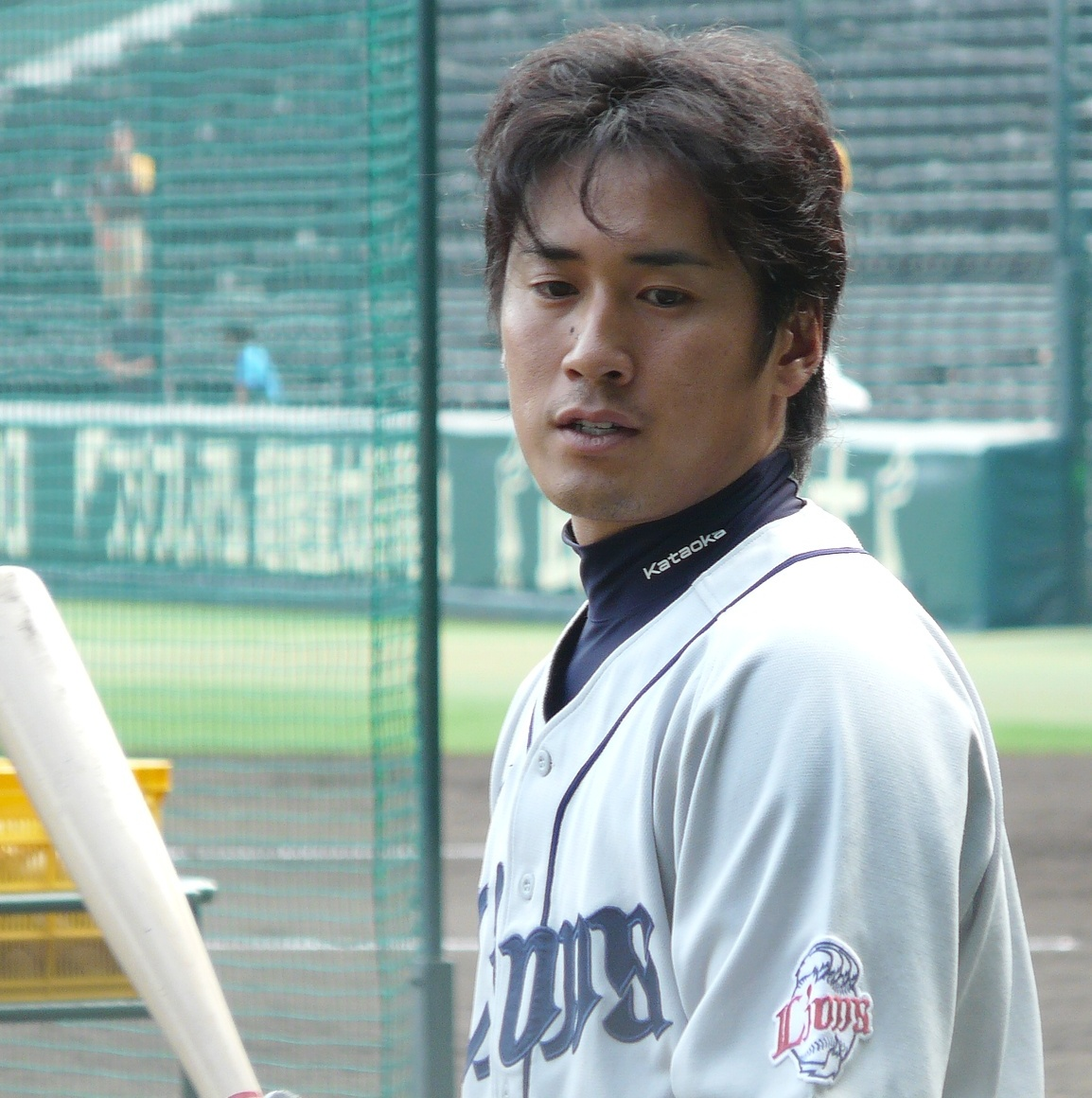
- Yasuyuki Kataoka, Japanese baseball player
- Pronunciation: jasɯjɯkʲi (IPA)
- Gender: Male

Origin
- Origin: Japanese
- Meaning: Different meanings depending on the kanji used

Yasuyuki is a masculine Japanese given name.

== Written forms ==
Yasuyuki can be written using many different combinations of kanji characters. Here are some examples:

- 靖幸, "peaceful, happiness"
- 靖行, "peaceful, to go"
- 靖之, "peaceful, of"
- 康幸, "healthy, happiness"
- 康行, "healthy, to go"
- 康之, "healthy, of"
- 安幸, "tranquil, happiness"
- 安行, "tranquil, to go"
- 保幸, "preserve, happiness"
- 保行, "preserve, to go"
- 保之, "preserve, of"
- 泰幸, "peaceful, happiness"
- 泰行, "peaceful, to go"
- 八洲幸, "8, continent, happiness"
- 易幸, "divination, happiness"
- 安由紀, "tranquil, reason, chronicle"

The name can also be written in hiragana やすゆき or katakana ヤスユキ.

== Notable people with the name ==
- Yasuyuki Eda (江田 康幸; born 1956), Japanese baseball player
- Yasuyuki Honne (本根 康之; born 1971), Japanese video game artist, director and producer
- Yasuyuki Ito (伊藤 靖倖; born 1938), Japanese boxer
- Yasuyuki Kase (加瀬 康之; born 1971), Japanese voice actor
- Yasuyuki Kataoka (片岡 易之; born 1983), Japanese baseball player
- Yasuyuki Kazama (風間 靖幸; born 1970), Japanese drifting driver
- Yasuyuki Kishino (岸野 靖之; born 1958), Japanese footballer and manager
- Yasuyuki Konno (今野 泰幸; born 1983), Japanese footballer
- Yasuyuki Kuwahara (桑原 楽之; born 1942), Japanese footballer
- Yasuyuki Moriyama (森山 泰行; born 1969), Japanese footballer
- Yasuyuki Muneta (棟田 康幸; born 1981), Japanese judoka
- Yasuyuki Nakai (中井康之?; 1954 – 2014) was a Japanese baseball player
- Yasuyuki Saigo (西郷 泰之; born 1972), Japanese baseball player
- Yasuyuki Sato (佐藤 康之; born 1966), Japanese footballer
- Yasuyuki Takishita (滝下 靖之; born 1976), Japanese alpine skier
- Yasuyuki Ueda (上田 耕行), Japanese animator
- Yasuyuki Yasuda (安田 安之), Japanese communist revolutionary

== See also ==
- Namikawa Yasuyuki (1845–1927), who was a Japanese cloisonné artist
