= SK Sparta =

SK Sparta may refer to:

- SK Sparta Krč, Czech sports club
- SK Bergen Sparta, Norwegian sports club
