= Roby Rausch =

Luxembourgish boxer

Personal information
- Nationality: Luxembourgian
- Born: 25 September 1937 Athus, Luxembourg
- Died: 16 December 2008 (aged 71) Mamer, Luxembourg

Sport
- Sport: Boxing

Roby Rausch (25 September 1937 – 16 December 2008) was a Luxembourgish boxer. He competed in the men's flyweight event at the 1960 Summer Olympics.
