= Esteban Aguilera =

Cuban boxer

Personal information
- Born: 2 September 1941; Manzanillo, Cuba
- Died: 5 May 2001 (aged 59); Manzanillo, Cuba

Sport
- Sport: Boxing

Esteban Aguilera (2 September 1941 – 5 May 2001) was a Cuban boxer. He competed in the men's lightweight event at the 1960 Summer Olympics.
