= Humberto Barrera =

American boxer

Personal information
- Born: December 31, 1941 (age 84) Corpus Christi, Texas, United States

Sport
- Sport: Boxing

Humberto Barrera (born December 31, 1941) is an American boxer. He competed in the men's flyweight event at the 1960 Summer Olympics.
