= Miguel Ángel Botta =

Argentine boxer (1941–2019)

Personal information
- Born: 10 October 1941 Buenos Aires, Argentina
- Died: 29 August 2019 (aged 77)

Sport
- Sport: Boxing
Medal record
Men's amateur boxing
Representing Argentina
Pan American Games
Gold medal – first place	1959 Chicago	Flyweight

Miguel Ángel Botta (10 October 1941 – 29 August 2019) was an Argentine boxer. He competed in the men's flyweight event at the 1960 Summer Olympics.
