= Albert Ludick =

South African boxer

Personal information
- Nationality: South African
- Born: 14 April 1939 (age 85); Ottoshoop, South Africa

Sport
- Sport: Boxing

Albert Ludick (born 14 April 1939) is a South African boxer. He competed in the men's flyweight event at the 1956 Summer Olympics. At the 1956 Summer Olympics, he lost to Abel Laudonio of Argentina.
