= Takeshi Fuji =

American boxer

Takeshi Fuji 藤猛
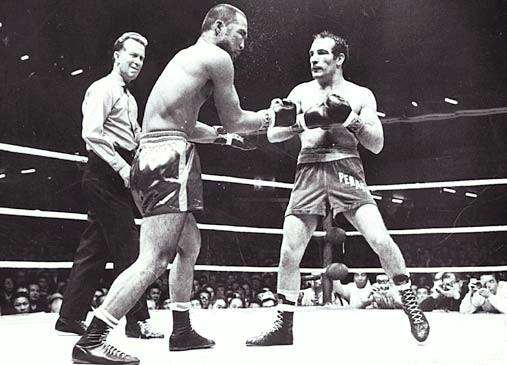

Personal information
- Nationality: Japanese; American (expatriate)
- Born: Paul Takeshi Fujii; July 6, 1940 (age 86) Honolulu, Territory of Hawaii
- Height: 5 ft 6 in (168 cm)
- Weight: Light welterweight

Boxing career
- Reach: 66 1/2 in (169 cm)
- Stance: Orthodox

Boxing record
- Total fights: 38
- Wins: 34
- Win by KO: 29
- Losses: 3
- Draws: 1

Takeshi Fuji (藤猛, born Paul Takeshi Fujii on July 6, 1940) is a Hawaiian-born Japanese former professional boxer. He is a former Undisputed, WBA and WBC super lightweight (light welterweight) champion.

== Early life and education ==
Born in 1940, Paul Fujii was a third-generation Japanese-Hawaiian. He was raised in the Territory of Hawaii, graduated from Farrington High School, and served in the United States Marine Corps.

== Amateur career ==
During his amateur boxing career, Fujii had a record of 116 wins and 16 losses over a total of 132 fights.

== Professional career ==
Fujii started boxing professionally in April 1964. He traveled to Japan, where he became known as Fuji Takeshi, and joined the boxing gym run by former professional wrestler Rikidōzan. Though he fought in Japan for most of his career, he could not speak Japanese. His trainer, Eddie Townsend, was also a Japanese-American. He made his professional debut in April, 1964 with a 2nd-round KO.

In June, 1965, Fuji challenged the Japanese super lightweight title, and won by KO only 45 seconds into the first round. This was his 11th professional fight, and he defended the title once before returning it. Fuji won the OPBF light welterweight title in 1966.

=== World title ===
In April 1967, Fujii challenged Lineal, WBA and WBC light welterweight champion Sandro Lopopolo. Fujii won in an upset victory by KO in the second round to become the new world champion. The match was declared a knockout victory for Fujii after he had knocked down Lopopolo three times in the same round, according to pre-agreed rules. In October 1967, Sports Illustrated noted that at the time, Fujii was one of only two world champions recognized by the WBA who was a native of the United States; the other nine were from other countries.

Fujii successfully defended his world junior welterweight title in November 1967, after knocking out Willy Quatuor of West Germany. In December, 1968, he faced Nicolino Locche to defend his WBA light welterweight title, but gave up in the 10th round.

=== Later career and legacy ===
In June, 1970, Fujii was scheduled to face former world champion Eddie Perkins in a non-title match, but suddenly withdrew from the fight claiming to have an injury. The Japan Boxing Commission penalized Fujii with a suspension, and he retired shortly afterwards. His record was 34-3-1 (29KOs).

In 1999, Fujii was inducted into the Hawaii Sports Hall of Fame. Fujii's record as the undisputed world champion in the 140-pound (63.5 kg) class in 1968 was not repeated until 2001, when Russian Australian Kostya Tszyu claimed the IBF, WBA, and WBC titles.

== Professional boxing record ==
38 fights	34 wins	3 losses
By knockout	29	2
By decision	5	1
Draws	1	

No.	Result	Record	Opponent	Type	Round, time	Date	Location	Notes
38	Win	34–3–1	Benito Juarez	KO	3 (10)	1970-05-03	Japan	
37	Win	33–3–1	Suk Kyu Park	KO	3 (10)	1970-03-05	Japan	
36	Draw	32–3–1	Byung Mo Lim	PTS	10 (10)	1969-09-25	Sumpu Arena, Shizuoka, Japan	
35	Win	32–3	Manfredo Alipala	KO	10 (10)	1969-07-24	Japan	
34	Loss	31–3	Nicolino Locche	RTD	10 (15)	1968-12-12	Kuramae Kokugikan, Tokyo, Japan	Lost WBA & The Ring light welterweight titles
33	Win	31–2	Roberto Cruz	KO	2 (10)	1968-04-02	Nakajima Sports Center, Sapporo, Japan	
32	Win	30–2	Johnny Williams	KO	2 (10)	1968-02-15	Japan	
31	Win	29–2	Sadao Takagi	KO	2 (10)	1967-12-21	Japan	
30	Win	28–2	Willi Quatuor	KO	4 (15)	1967-11-16	Kuramae Kokugikan, Tokyo, Japan	Retained WBA, WBC & The Ring light welterweight titles
29	Win	27–2	Fel Pedranza	KO	2 (10)	1967-08-29	Honolulu International Center, Honolulu, Hawaii, U.S.	
28	Win	26–2	Sandro Lopopolo	KO	2 (15)	1967-04-30	Kuramae Kokugikan, Tokyo, Japan	Won WBA, WBC & The Ring light welterweight titles
27	Win	25–2	Carl Peñalosa	KO	2 (12)	1967-02-13	Japan	Retained OPBF light welterweight title
26	Win	24–2	Jesse Cortez	KO	3 (10)	1967-01-05	Japan	
25	Win	23–2	Kid Bassey II	UD	10 (10)	1966-12-06	Honolulu International Center, Honolulu, Hawaii, U.S.	
24	Win	22–2	Luis Molina	RTD	3 (10)	1966-11-15	Honolulu International Center, Honolulu, Hawaii, U.S.	
23	Win	21–2	Larry Flaviano	KO	2 (10)	1966-11-03	Japan	
22	Win	20–2	Rocky Alarde	KO	3 (12)	1966-09-29	Japan	Won OPBF light welterweight title
21	Win	19–2	Shigeru Ogiwara	KO	2 (10)	1966-08-25	Kitakyushu, Japan	Retained Japanese light welterweight title
20	Win	18–2	Byung Oh Chang	KO	2 (10)	1966-07-28	Prefectural Gymnasium, Yamagata City, Japan	
19	Win	17–2	Alfredo Fuentes	TKO	4 (10)	1966-06-27	Akita City, Japan	
18	Loss	16–2	Fel Pedranza	KO	6 (10)	1966-06-05	Prefectural Gymnasium, Osaka, Japan	
17	Win	16–1	Rudy Gonzalez	PTS	10 (10)	1966-05-05	Japan	
16	Win	15–1	Ador Plaza	KO	4 (10)	1966-03-21	Japan	
15	Win	14–1	Kim Deuk-bong	KO	2 (10)	1966-01-20	Japan	
14	Loss	13–1	Johnny Santos	UD	10 (10)	1965-11-16	Civic Auditorium, Honolulu, Hawaii, U.S.	
13	Win	13–0	Willie Castillo	TKO	7 (10)	1965-11-02	Honolulu International Center, Honolulu, Hawaii, U.S.	
12	Win	12–0	Yuji Tsukuba	KO	8 (10)	1965-09-09	Japan	
11	Win	11–0	Nakao Sasazaki	KO	1 (10)	1965-06-18	Japan	Won vacant Japanese light welterweight title
10	Win	10–0	Neto Villareal	PTS	8 (8)	1965-04-06	Honolulu International Center, Honolulu, Hawaii, U.S.	
9	Win	9–0	Leopoldo Corona	UD	10 (10)	1965-03-09	Civic Auditorium, Honolulu, Hawaii, U.S.	
8	Win	8–0	Arnie Cota Robles	TKO	8 (8)	1965-02-23	Civic Auditorium, Honolulu, Hawaii, U.S.	
7	Win	7–0	Manuel Lugo	KO	3 (10)	1965-02-16	Civic Auditorium, Honolulu, Hawaii, U.S.	
6	Win	6–0	Bernie Magallanes	TKO	3 (8)	1965-01-26	Civic Auditorium, Honolulu, Hawaii, U.S.	
5	Win	5–0	Noriyasu Yoshimura	KO	2 (8)	1964-10-03	Japan	
4	Win	4–0	Fujio Mikami	TKO	4 (8)	1964-07-18	Japan	
3	Win	3–0	Akio Matsunaga	KO	3 (6)	1964-06-30	Japan	
2	Win	2–0	Kunio Yoshida	PTS	6 (6)	1964-05-26	Japan	
1	Win	1–0	Minoru Goto	KO	2 (6)	1964-04-14	Japan	

== Titles in boxing ==
=== Major world titles ===
- WBA light welterweight champion (140 lbs)
- WBC light welterweight champion (140 lbs)

=== The Ring magazine titles ===
- The Ring light welterweight champion (140 lbs)

=== Regional/International titles ===
- Japanese light welterweight champion (140 lbs)
- OPBF light welterweight champion (140 lbs)

=== Undisputed titles ===
- Undisputed light welterweight champion

== Film ==
Paul Fujii starred in a feature-length film playing himself called The Story of Paul Fujii, which was released in 1968.

== Personal life ==
After retiring as a professional boxer, Fujii returned to Hawaii. In 1996, he moved back to Japan, briefly serving as chairman of the Iwaki Kyōei Gym. He went on to teach boxing mainly to children in Mito, Ibaraki, until the gym went bankrupt in June 2015.

In August 2015, Fujii registered as a special trainer at a gym in Ōta, Tokyo. At the time, his wife and two of his children were living in Hawaii, while his eldest son's family lived in Japan.

== See also ==
- Lineal championship
- Boxing in Japan
- List of Japanese boxing world champions
- List of world light-welterweight boxing champions

Sporting positions
Regional boxing titles
Vacant Title last held by Koji Okano	Japanese light welterweight champion June 18, 1965 – 1967; Vacated	Vacant Title next held by Shigeru Ogiwara
Preceded by Rocky Alarde	OPBF light welterweight champion September 29, 1966 – 1967; Vacated	Vacant Title next held by Larry Flaviano
World boxing titles
Preceded by Sandro Lopopolo	WBA light welterweight champion April 30, 1967 – December 12, 1968	Succeeded by Nicolino Locche
Preceded by Sandro Lopopolo	WBC light welterweight champion April 30, 1967 – November 14, 1968; Stripped	Vacant Title next held by Pedro Adigue
Preceded by Sandro Lopopolo	The Ring light welterweight champion April 30, 1967 – December 12, 1968	Succeeded by Nicolino Locche
Preceded by Sandro Lopopolo	Undisputed light welterweight champion April 30, 1967 – November 14, 1968; Titles fragmented	Vacant Title next held by Kostya Tszyu
