= Yai Shwe =

Burmese boxer

Personal information
- Full name: Yai Shwe
- Nationality: Burmese
- Born: 6 July 1939 (age 85)

Sport
- Sport: Boxing

Yai Shwe, also Ye Swe, (born 6 July 1939) is a Burmese boxer. He competed in the men's flyweight event at the 1956 Summer Olympics.
