= Danny Lee (boxer) =

British boxer

Personal information
- Full name: Elliott is
- Nationality: British
- Born: 5 January 1940 (age 85); Port Glasgow, Scotland

Sport
- Sport: Boxing

Daniel Lee (born 5 January 1940) is a British former boxer. He competed in the men's flyweight event at the 1960 Summer Olympics. He fought as Danny Lee. At the 1960 Summer Olympics, he defeated Salek Mahju of Indonesia, before losing to Manfred Homberg of the United Team of Germany.

Lee won the 1960 Amateur Boxing Association British flyweight title, when boxing out of the Woodhall ABC.
