= Sid Prior =

Australian boxer

Personal information
- Nationality: Australian
- Born: 17 February 1943 (age 83) Paddington, New South Wales, Australia

Sport
- Sport: Boxing

Sid Prior (born 17 February 1943) is an Australian boxer. He competed in the men's lightweight event at the 1960 Summer Olympics.

Prior grew up in Bankstown, New South Wales.

== Amateur career ==
As an amateur he won New South Wales, Australian and Australasian light-welterweight titles, and was selected for the Australian team at the 1960 Summer Olympics in Rome, where, aged 17, he was the youngest member of the squad. He reportedly won 73 of 87 amateur bouts and was never stopped.
