= Jo Horny =

Belgian boxer

Personal information
- Nationality: Belgian
- Born: 3 September 1938 (age 86); Brussels, Belgium

Sport
- Sport: Boxing

Jo Horny (born 3 September 1938) is a Belgian boxer. He competed in the men's flyweight event at the 1960 Summer Olympics.
