= Jacques Cotot =

French boxer

Personal information
- Nationality: French
- Born: 11 August 1940 (age 85) Bragny-sur-Saône, France

Sport
- Sport: Boxing

Jacques Cotot (born 11 August 1940) is a French boxer. He competed at the 1960 Summer Olympics and the 1964 Summer Olympics. At the 1960 Summer Olympics, he lost by decision to Ferenc Kellner of Hungary in the Round of 32 after receiving a bye in the round of 64.
