= Sandro Lopopolo =

Italian boxer (1939–2014)

Alessandro Lopopolo
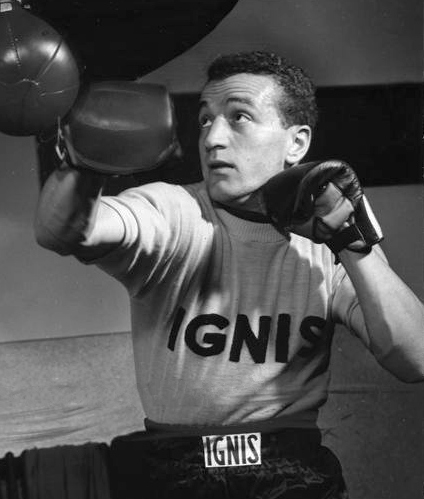

Personal information
- Nationality: Italian
- Born: 18 December 1939 Milan, Italy
- Died: 26 April 2014 (aged 74) Milan, Italy
- Height: 5 ft 5 1/2 in (166 cm)
- Weight: Light welterweight

Boxing career
- Stance: Orthodox

Boxing record
- Total fights: 76
- Wins: 58
- Win by KO: 20
- Losses: 10
- Draws: 7
- No contests: 1
Medal record
Men's Boxing
Representing Italy
Olympic Games
Silver medal – second place	1960 Rome	Lightweight

Alessandro "Sandro" Lopopolo (18 December 1939 – 26 April 2014) was an Italian 1959 amateur featherweight and 1960 amateur lightweight boxing champion, and also world boxing champion in the light welterweight division afterwards, when he turned professional, between 1961 and 1973. Sandro Lopopolo started his career in 1957.

== Boxing career ==
Sandro Lopopolo was considered as a hometown favorite for the lightweight division Olympic boxing title at the 1960 Summer Olympics in Rome where he won the silver medal. At the Olympics, after four easy wins in the early rounds, Lopopolo defeated the Argentine Abel Laudino by split decision in the semifinals. He lost the final to Kazimierz Paździor by a majority decision. Lopopolo turned professional in early 1961 and had a long and successful professional career. Fighting in the light-welterweight category most of his professional career, Lopopolo won the Italian light-welterweight titles in 1963 and 1965 and held the European and World light-welterweight title from April 1966 to April 1967.

Lopopolo won the Lineal, WBA and WBC light welterweight titles from Carlos Morocho Hernández on 29 April 1966, after outpointing his opponent. He lost the crown to Paul Takeshi Fuji on 30 April 1967 by technical knockout in the 2nd round. He retired with a record of 58 wins (20 KOs), 10 losses and 7 draws. Lopopolo liked to box from a distance and was part of “the golden era” of Italian boxing, with the likes of Duilio Loi, Nino Benvenuti, Sandro Mazzinghi, Bruno Arcari and Carmelo Bossi.

Lopopolo died in 2014, at age 74, in his hometown, Milan, due to a complication from a respiratory infection.

== Professional boxing record ==
76 fights	58 wins	10 losses
By knockout	20	2
By decision	36	8
By disqualification	2	0
Draws	7	
No contests	1	

No.	Result	Record	Opponent	Type	Round, time	Date	Location	Notes
76	Win	58–10–7 (1)	Pietro Gasparri	PTS	10 (10)	1973-03-30	Novara, Italy	
75	Loss	57–10–7 (1)	Roger Menetrey	TKO	13 (15)	1972-12-09	Grenoble, France	For EBU welterweight title
74	Win	57–9–7 (1)	Carlos Cappella	PTS	10 (10)	1972-04-20	PalaLido, Milan, Italy	
73	Loss	56–9–7 (1)	Roger Zami	UD	15 (15)	1972-02-28	Paris, France	For vacant EBU light welterweight title
72	Win	56–8–7 (1)	Percy Pugh	PTS	10 (10)	1971-11-12	Milan, Italy	
71	Win	55–8–7 (1)	Jean Vantorre	KO	1 (10)	1971-07-29	Monza, Italy	
70	Loss	54–8–7 (1)	Robert Gallois	PTS	10 (10)	1971-06-09	Stade Roland Garros, Paris, France	
69	Win	54–7–7 (1)	Dorman Crawford	DQ	5 (8)	1971-05-14	Milan, Italy	
68	Win	53–7–7 (1)	Roger Menetrey	PTS	10 (10)	1971-03-22	Paris, France	
67	Draw	52–7–7 (1)	Marcel Cerdan Jr	PTS	10 (10)	1971-01-25	Paris, France	
66	Win	52–7–6 (1)	David Pesenti	PTS	8 (8)	1970-10-30	Palazzo Dello Sport, Genoa, Italy	
65	Draw	51–7–6 (1)	Dorman Crawford	PTS	10 (10)	1970-07-02	Milan, Italy	
64	Win	51–7–5 (1)	Georges Fabbri	PTS	8 (8)	1970-05-30	Aosta, Italy	
63	Loss	50–7–5 (1)	Rene Roque	PTS	15 (15)	1970-04-22	Montecatini Terme, Italy	For vacant EBU light welterweight title
62	Win	50–6–5 (1)	Miloud N'Diaye	PTS	10 (10)	1970-01-17	Cagliari, Italy	
61	Win	49–6–5 (1)	Lennox Beckles	KO	1 (10)	1969-12-19	Milan, Italy	
60	Win	48–6–5 (1)	Miloud N'Diaye	PTS	10 (10)	1969-11-08	Novara, Italy	
59	Win	47–6–5 (1)	Larry Flaviano	TKO	8 (10)	1969-10-10	Milan, Italy	
58	Win	46–6–5 (1)	Eddie Machen Jr	KO	1 (10)	1969-09-06	Prato, Italy	
57	Win	45–6–5 (1)	Olli Maki	PTS	10 (10)	1969-07-11	Milan, Italy	
56	Win	44–6–5 (1)	Lakdar El Harizi	PTS	8 (8)	1969-05-09	PalaLido, Milan, Italy	
55	Win	43–6–5 (1)	Sylvain Lucchesi	PTS	8 (8)	1969-04-03	PalaLido, Milan, Italy	
54	Win	42–6–5 (1)	Quintino Soares	TKO	2 (10)	1969-03-14	Pavia, Italy	
53	Loss	41–6–5 (1)	Lennox Beckles	PTS	10 (10)	1968-05-26	San Siro, Milan, Italy	
52	Win	41–5–5 (1)	Conny Rudhof	PTS	10 (10)	1968-03-23	Belgrade, Yugoslavia	
51	Win	40–5–5 (1)	Massimo Consolati	TKO	5 (10)	1967-10-08	Belgrade, Yugoslavia	
50	Loss	39–5–5 (1)	Takeshi Fuji	KO	2 (15)	1967-04-30	Kokugikan, Tokyo, Japan	Lost WBA, WBC & The Ring light welterweight titles
49	Win	39–4–5 (1)	Joe Africa	PTS	10 (10)	1966-11-25	Torino, Italy	
48	Win	38–4–5 (1)	Vicente Rivas	RTD	7 (15)	1966-10-21	PalaEur, Roma, Italy	Retained WBA, WBC & The Ring light welterweight titles
47	Loss	37–4–5 (1)	Nicolino Locche	UD	10 (10)	1966-09-10	Estadio Luna Park, Buenos Aires, Argentina	
46	Win	37–3–5 (1)	Klaus Klein	PTS	10 (10)	1966-08-10	Senigallia, Italy	
45	Loss	36–3–5 (1)	Vicente Rivas	SD	10 (10)	1966-07-08	Palacio de Deportes, Caracas, Venezuela	
44	Win	36–2–5 (1)	Carlos Hernández	MD	15 (15)	1966-04-29	PalaEur, Roma, Italy	Won WBA, WBC & The Ring light welterweight titles
43	Win	35–2–5 (1)	Romano Bianchi	PTS	12 (12)	1965-12-14	Ascoli Piceno, Italy	
42	Draw	34–2–5 (1)	Francesco Caruso	PTS	10 (10)	1965-08-22	Francavilla a Mare, Italy	
41	Loss	34–2–4 (1)	Juan Albornoz	PTS	15 (15)	1965-07-17	Santa Cruz de Tenerife, Spain	For vacant EBU light welterweight title
40	Win	34–1–4 (1)	Antonio Fernandes de Jesus	PTS	10 (10)	1965-06-18	Verona, Italy	
39	Win	33–1–4 (1)	Piero Brandi	TKO	8 (12)	1965-03-13	Genoa, Italy	Won Italian light welterweight title
38	Win	32–1–4 (1)	Antonio Fernandes de Jesus	PTS	10 (10)	1965-02-05	Piacenza, Italy	
37	Win	31–1–4 (1)	Jose Luiz Penteado	PTS	10 (10)	1964-12-19	Palazzo dello Sport, Milan, Italy	
36	Loss	30–1–4 (1)	Piero Brandi	PTS	12 (12)	1964-09-24	Treviso, Italy	Lost Italian light welterweight title
35	Win	30–0–4 (1)	Massimo Consolati	PTS	12 (12)	1964-07-25	Senigallia, Italy	Retained Italian light welterweight title
34	Win	29–0–4 (1)	Giordano Campari	PTS	12 (12)	1964-06-28	Saint-Vincent, Italy	Retained Italian light welterweight title
33	Draw	28–0–4 (1)	Valerio Nunez	PTS	10 (10)	1964-04-22	PalaLido, Milan, Italy	
32	Win	28–0–3 (1)	Douglas Vaillant	PTS	10 (10)	1963-12-20	Milan, Italy	
31	Win	27–0–3 (1)	Francesco Caruso	PTS	12 (12)	1963-11-29	Mestre, Italy	Won vacant Italian light welterweight title
30	Win	26–0–3 (1)	Karl Furcht	TKO	6 (10)	1963-11-08	PalaLido, Milan, Italy	
29	Win	25–0–3 (1)	Michele Gullotti	PTS	8 (8)	1963-10-04	Milan, Italy	
28	Draw	24–0–3 (1)	Mario Vecchiatto	PTS	10 (10)	1963-05-05	Velodromo Vigorelli, Milan, Italy	
27	Win	24–0–2 (1)	Tommy O'Connor	KO	1 (10)	1963-03-08	Milan, Italy	
26	Win	23–0–2 (1)	J D Ellis	PTS	10 (10)	1963-01-25	Palazzo dello Sport, Milan, Italy	
25	Win	22–0–2 (1)	Rene Barriere	TKO	5 (10)	1962-12-15	Palazzo dello Sport, Milan, Italy	
24	Win	21–0–2 (1)	Jean Dantas	PTS	10 (10)	1962-10-25	Salsomaggiore, Italy	
23	Win	20–0–2 (1)	Francesco Caruso	PTS	8 (8)	1962-09-28	Palazzetto dello Sport, Roma, Italy	
22	Win	19–0–2 (1)	Bernard Moreau	PTS	8 (8)	1962-09-14	Velodromo Vigorelli, Milan, Italy	
21	Win	18–0–2 (1)	Romolo Spila	PTS	8 (8)	1962-07-22	Civitanova Marche, Italy	
20	Win	17–0–2 (1)	Belaid Meslem	PTS	8 (8)	1962-06-30	Saint-Vincent, Italy	
19	Win	16–0–2 (1)	Miguel Campos Lopez	TKO	2 (8)	1962-06-16	Reggio Emilia, Italy	
18	Win	15–0–2 (1)	Roger Younsi	PTS	8 (8)	1962-05-26	Velodromo Vigorelli, Milan, Italy	
17	Win	14–0–2 (1)	Aime De Visch	PTS	8 (8)	1962-04-29	Velodromo Vigorelli, Milan, Italy	
16	Win	13–0–2 (1)	Mohammed Ben Said	TKO	6 (10)	1962-04-10	Torino, Italy	
15	Win	12–0–2 (1)	Jacques Chauveau	TKO	7 (10)	1962-03-22	PalaLido, Milan, Italy	
14	Win	11–0–2 (1)	Sesto Righeschi	PTS	8 (8)	1962-02-27	Ascoli Piceno, Italy	
13	Win	10–0–2 (1)	Boby Ros	PTS	8 (8)	1962-01-19	Milan, Italy	
12	Win	9–0–2 (1)	Giuseppe Fanfoni	TKO	1 (8)	1961-12-26	Milan, Italy	
11	Win	8–0–2 (1)	Jaime Aparici	PTS	8 (8)	1961-11-24	Milan, Italy	
10	Win	7–0–2 (1)	Ahcene Attar	TKO	6 (8)	1961-10-21	Palazzo dello Sport, Milan, Italy	
9	Draw	6–0–2 (1)	Nedo Stampi	PTS	8 (8)	1961-10-06	Florence, Italy	
8	Win	6–0–1 (1)	Giuliano Tarquini	KO	2 (8)	1961-09-26	Torino, Italy	
7	Win	5–0–1 (1)	Mario Pallavera	PTS	8 (8)	1961-08-05	Saint-Vincent, Italy	
6	Win	4–0–1 (1)	Renato Messori	KO	5 (6)	1961-07-22	Saronno, Italy	
5	Win	3–0–1 (1)	Milov Bulat	TKO	6 (6)	1961-06-23	Milan, Italy	
4	Win	2–0–1 (1)	Antonio Di Paolo	DQ	5 (6)	1961-05-31	Roma, Italy	
3	NC	1–0–1 (1)	Luigi Lombardi	NC	3 (6)	1961-03-31	Ancona, Italy	
2	Draw	1–0–1	Roberto Misin	PTS	6 (6)	1961-03-18	PalaLido, Milan, Italy	
1	Win	1–0	Bernardo Favia	TKO	2 (6)	1961-03-04	Palazzo dello Sport, Milan, Italy	

== Titles in boxing ==
=== Major world titles ===
- WBA light welterweight champion (140 lbs)
- WBC light welterweight champion (140 lbs)

=== The Ring magazine titles ===
- The Ring light welterweight champion (140 lbs)

=== Regional/International titles ===
- Italian light welterweight champion (140 lbs) (2×)

=== Undisputed titles ===
- Undisputed light welterweight champion

== See also ==
- List of world light-welterweight boxing champions

Sporting positions
World boxing titles
Preceded by Carlos Hernández	WBA light welterweight champion April 29, 1966 – April 30, 1967	Succeeded by Takeshi Fuji
Preceded by Carlos Hernández	WBC light welterweight champion April 29, 1966 – April 30, 1967	Succeeded by Takeshi Fuji
Preceded by Carlos Hernández	The Ring light welterweight champion April 29, 1966 – April 30, 1967	Succeeded by Takeshi Fuji
Preceded by Carlos Hernández	Undisputed light welterweight champion April 29, 1966 – April 30, 1967	Succeeded by Takeshi Fuji
