= Adam McLean (boxer) =

Irish boxer

Personal information
- Nationality: Irish
- Born: 7 July 1940 (age 84); Belfast, Northern Ireland

Sport
- Sport: Boxing

Adam McLean (born 7 July 1940) is an Irish boxer. He competed in the men's flyweight event at the 1960 Summer Olympics.
