= Stoffel Steyn =

South African boxer

Personal information
- Nationality: South African
- Born: 14 August 1941 (age 83); Potchefstroom, South Africa

Sport
- Sport: Boxing

Stoffel Steyn (born 14 August 1941) is a South African boxer. He competed in the men's lightweight event at the 1960 Summer Olympics.
