= Väinö Järvenpää =

Finnish boxer

Personal information
- Nationality: Finnish
- Born: 25 September 1933 Ii, Finland
- Died: 30 January 1994 (aged 60)

Sport
- Sport: Boxing

Väinö Järvenpää (25 September 1933 – 30 January 1994) was a Finnish boxer. He competed in the men's lightweight event at the 1960 Summer Olympics.
