= Fernando Riera (boxer) =

Spanish boxer

Personal information
- Full name: Fernando José Riera Ros
- Nationality: Spanish
- Born: 20 April 1940 (age 84); Sueca, Spain

Sport
- Sport: Boxing

Fernando José Riera Ros (born 20 April 1940) is a Spanish boxer. He competed in the men's lightweight event at the 1960 Summer Olympics.
