= Salek Mahju =

Indonesian boxer

Personal information
- Nationality: Indonesian
- Born: 13 June 1935 (age 89)

Sport
- Sport: Boxing

Salek Mahju (born 13 June 1935) is an Indonesian boxer. He competed in the men's flyweight event at the 1960 Summer Olympics. At the 1960 Summer Olympics, he lost to Danny Lee of Great Britain.
