= Dimitar Stoilov =

Bulgarian boxer

Personal information
- Nationality: Bulgarian
- Born: 1 January 1931; Krapets, Bulgaria

Sport
- Sport: Boxing

Dimitar Stoilov (born 1 January 1931) is a Bulgarian boxer. He competed in the men's lightweight event at the 1960 Summer Olympics.
