= Paul Chervet =

Swiss boxer

Personal information
- Nationality: Swiss
- Born: 20 October 1941; Bern, Switzerland
- Died: 16 July 2015 (aged 73); Wang Yang, Thailand

Sport
- Sport: Boxing

Paul Chervet (20 October 1941 – 16 July 2015) was a Swiss boxer. He competed in the men's flyweight event at the 1960 Summer Olympics. At the 1960 Summer Olympics, he defeated Kicha Poonphol of Thailand by decision in the Round of 32, before losing to Mircea Dobrescu of Romania by knockout in the Round of 16.
