= Phajol Muangson =

Thai boxer

Personal information
- Nationality: Thai
- Born: 1933 (age 91–92)

Sport
- Sport: Boxing

Phajol Muangson (born 1933) is a Thai boxer. He competed in the men's flyweight event at the 1956 Summer Olympics.
