= Jozef Töre =

Slovak boxer (born 1933)

Personal information
- Nationality: Slovak
- Born: 18 June 1933 Fiľakovo, Czechoslovakia
- Died: 8 August 2007 (aged 74)

Sport
- Sport: Boxing

Jozef Töre (18 June 1933 – 8 August 2007) was a Slovak boxer. He competed in the men's lightweight event at the 1960 Summer Olympics.
