= Josef Grumser =

Austrian boxer

Personal information
- Nationality: Austrian
- Born: 10 February 1934; Brad, Austria
- Died: 10 January 2017 (aged 82)

Sport
- Sport: Boxing

Josef Grumser (10 February 1934 – 10 January 2017) was an Austrian boxer. He competed in the men's lightweight event at the 1960 Summer Olympics.
