= Antoine Porcel =

French boxer (1937–2014)

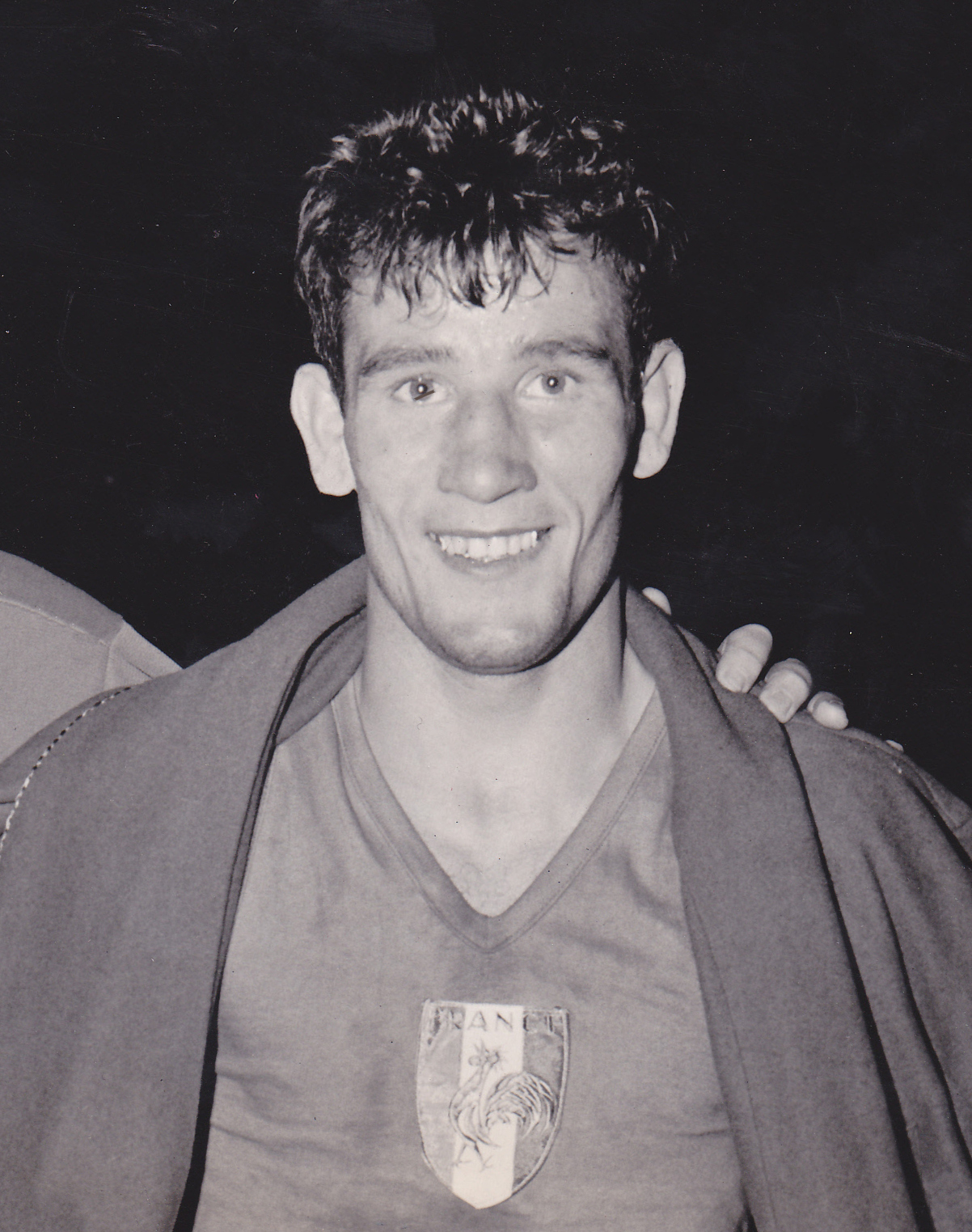
- Porcel at the 1960 Olympics

Personal information
- Born: 17 December 1937 Oran, Algeria
- Died: 22 March 2014 (aged 76) Ferney-Voltaire, France
- Height: 165 cm (5 ft 5 in)
- Weight: 51 kg (112 lb)

Sport
- Sport: Boxing

Antoine "Tony" Porcel (17 December 1937 – 22 March 2014) was a French boxer. He competed in the 1960 Summer Olympics, where he was disqualified in his third bout against Sergei Sivko. In 1963 he turned professional and retired in 1973 with a record of 26 wins (11 by knockout), 25 losses and 10 draws. He was the French bantamweight champion in 1966–67 and 1970–71, and lost a 1966 match for the European flyweight title to René Libeer. He later became a boxing trainer, and died from Alzheimer's disease at the age 76.

== 1960 Olympic results ==
Below is the record of Antoine Porcel, a French flyweight boxer who competed at the 1960 Rome Olympics:

- Round of 32: defeated Ralph Knoesen (South Africa) by decision, 5–0
- Round of 16: lost to Sergey Sivko (Soviet Union) dy disqualification in the third round
