= Glodeanu-Siliștea =

- Commune
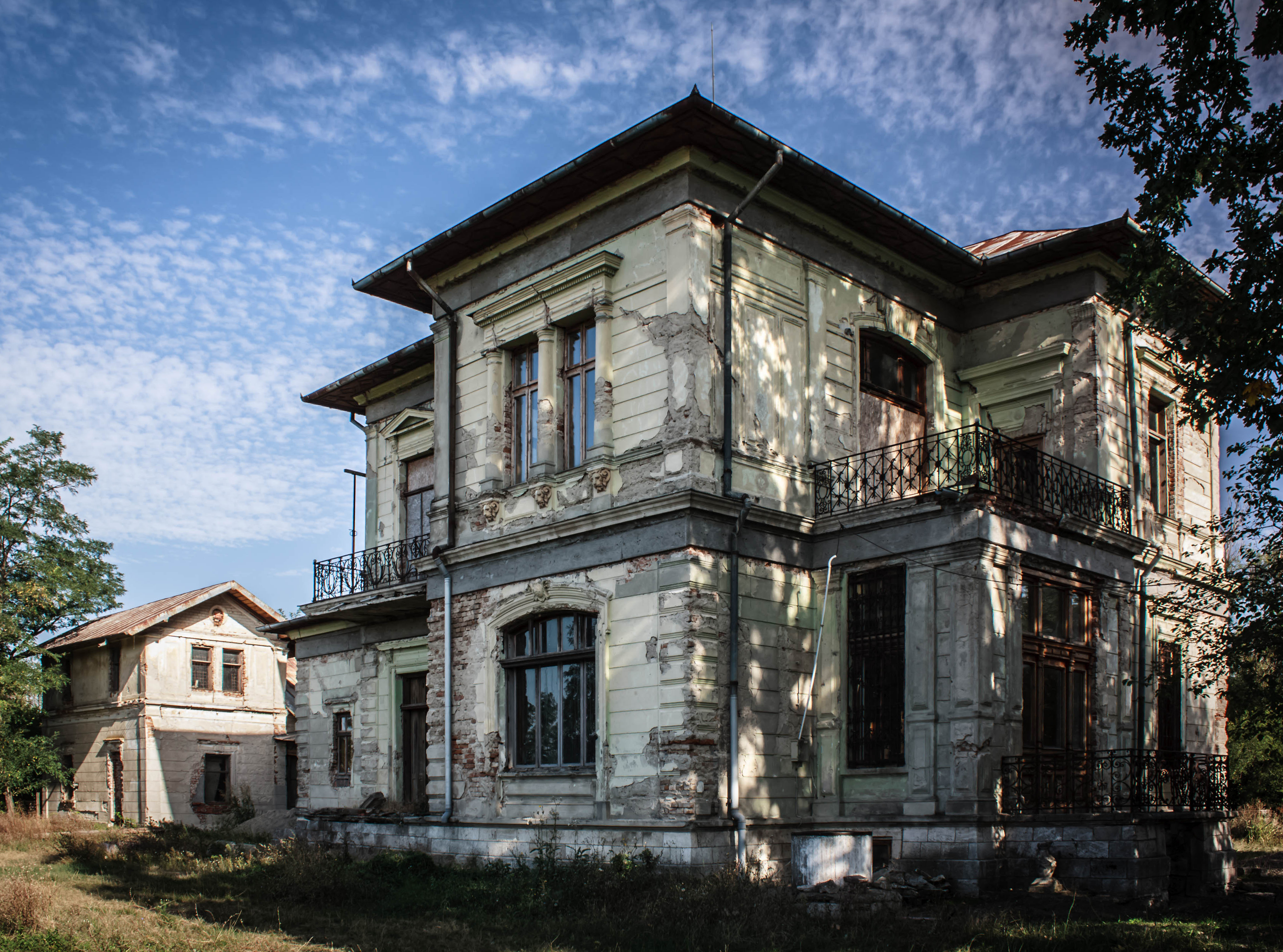
- Procopie Casota mansion in Casota village

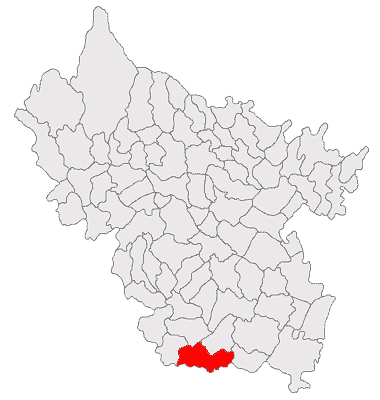
- Location in Buzău County

- Location in Romania
- Coordinates: 44°50′N 26°48′E
- Country: Romania
- County: Buzău
- Subdivisions: Casota, Cârligu Mic, Cârligu Mare, Corbu, Cotorca, Glodeanu-Siliștea, Sat Nou, Văcăreasca

Government
  - Mayor (2020–2024): Gabriel Popescu (PSD)
- Area: 92.55 km^{2} (35.73 sq mi)
- Elevation: 74 m (243 ft)
- Population (2021-12-01): 3,364
  - Density: 36.35/km^{2} (94.14/sq mi)
- Time zone: UTC+02:00 (EET)
  - Summer (DST): UTC+03:00 (EEST)
- Postal code: 127260
- Area code: +(40) 238
- Vehicle reg.: BZ
- Website: www.glodeanu-silistea.ro

Glodeanu-Siliștea is a commune located in the southern part of Buzău County, Muntenia, Romania, in the Bărăgan Plain. It is composed of eight villages: Casota, Cârligu Mare, Cârligu Mic, Corbu, Cotorca, Glodeanu-Siliștea, Satu Nou, and Văcăreasca.

== Location ==
The commune is situated approximately 90 km (56 mi) northeast of the national capital Bucharest. The city of Buzău (the county capital) can be reached via Smârdana, Brădeanul, Smeeni (48 km), or through Glodeanul Cârlig, Văcăreasca, and Casota and the DN2 road (36 km). Glodeanu-Siliștea is also 20 km away from the towns of Mizil and Pogoanele, 25 km Urziceni, and 45 km from Buzău.

Historical population
Year	Pop.	±%
2002	4,647	—
2011	3,998	−14.0%
2021	3,364	−15.9%
Source: Census data

== Natives ==
- Mircea Dobrescu (1930–2015), flyweight boxer
- Marin Gheorghe (born 1959), rowing coxswain
