= Yasuyuki Ito =

Japanese boxer

Personal information
- Nationality: Japanese
- Born: 27 August 1938 (age 86); Tokyo, Japan

Sport
- Sport: Boxing

Yasuyuki Ito (伊藤 靖倖, Itō Yasuyuki, born 27 August 1938) is a Japanese boxer. He competed in the men's lightweight event at the 1960 Summer Olympics. At the 1960 Summer Olympics, he defeated Abdel Kader Gangani of Morocco, before losing to Ferenc Kellner of Hungary.
