= Abdel Moneim El-Guindi =

Egyptian boxer (1936–2011)

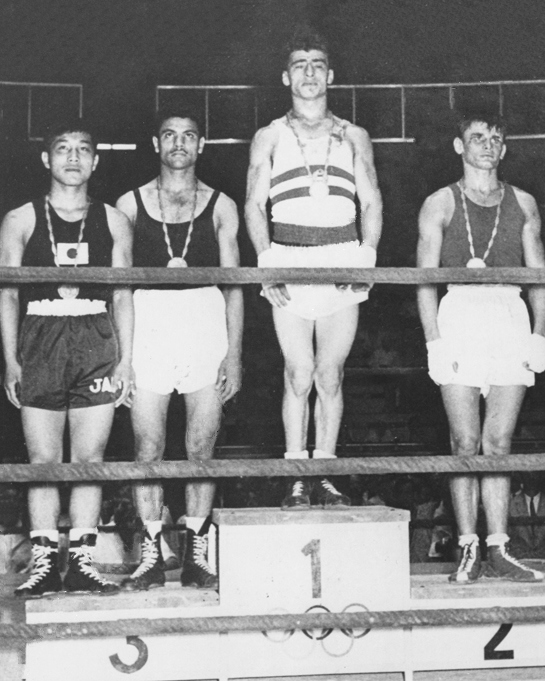
- El-Guindi (2nd left) at the 1960 Olympics

Personal information
- Born: 12 June 1936 Alexandria, Egypt
- Died: 17 March 2011 (aged 74)

Sport
- Sport: Boxing
Medal record
Representing United Arab Republic
Olympic Games
Bronze medal – third place	1960 Rome	Flyweight
Mediterranean Games
Gold medal – first place	1959 Beirut	Flyweight

Abdel Moneim El-Guindi (Egyptian Arabic: عبد المنعم الجندى; 12 June 1936 – 17 March 2011) was an Egyptian amateur flyweight boxer. He competed for the United Arab Republic at the 1960 Summer Olympics and won a bronze medal.
