= Pyo Hyeon-gi =

Korean male boxer

Personal information
- Nationality: South Korean
- Born: 14 March 1933 (age 92)

Sport
- Sport: Boxing

Pyo Hyeon-gi (born 14 March 1933) is a South Korean boxer. He competed in the men's flyweight event at the 1956 Summer Olympics. At the 1956 Summer Olympics, he lost to René Libeer of France.
