= Segundo Macalalad =

Filipino boxer

Personal information
- Nationality: Filipino
- Born: June 1, 1940 (age 86) Lucena, Quezon, Philippines
- Height: 5 ft 5 in (165 cm)
- Weight: 110 lb (50 kg)

Boxing career
- Weight class: Flyweight

Segundo Macalalad (born June 1, 1940) is a Filipino former boxer. He competed in the men's flyweight event at the 1960 Summer Olympics.
