= James Badrian =

Rhodesian boxer (1940–1979)

Personal information
- Nationality: Rhodesian
- Born: 8 June 1940; Johannesburg, South Africa
- Died: 30 July 1979 (aged 39); Rustenburg, South Africa

Sport
- Sport: Boxing

James Badrian (8 June 1940 – 30 July 1979) was a Rhodesian boxer. He competed in the men's flyweight event at the 1960 Summer Olympics, representing Rhodesia. At the 1960 Summer Olympics, he lost to Ezaria Ilkhanoff of Iran.
