= Eusebio Mesa =

Spanish boxer

Personal information
- Nationality: Spanish
- Born: 23 September 1939 (age 85); Las Palmas, Spain

Sport
- Sport: Boxing

Eusebio Mesa (born 23 September 1939) is a Spanish boxer. He competed in the men's flyweight event at the 1960 Summer Olympics.
