= Velikton Barannikov =

Russian boxer (1938–2007)

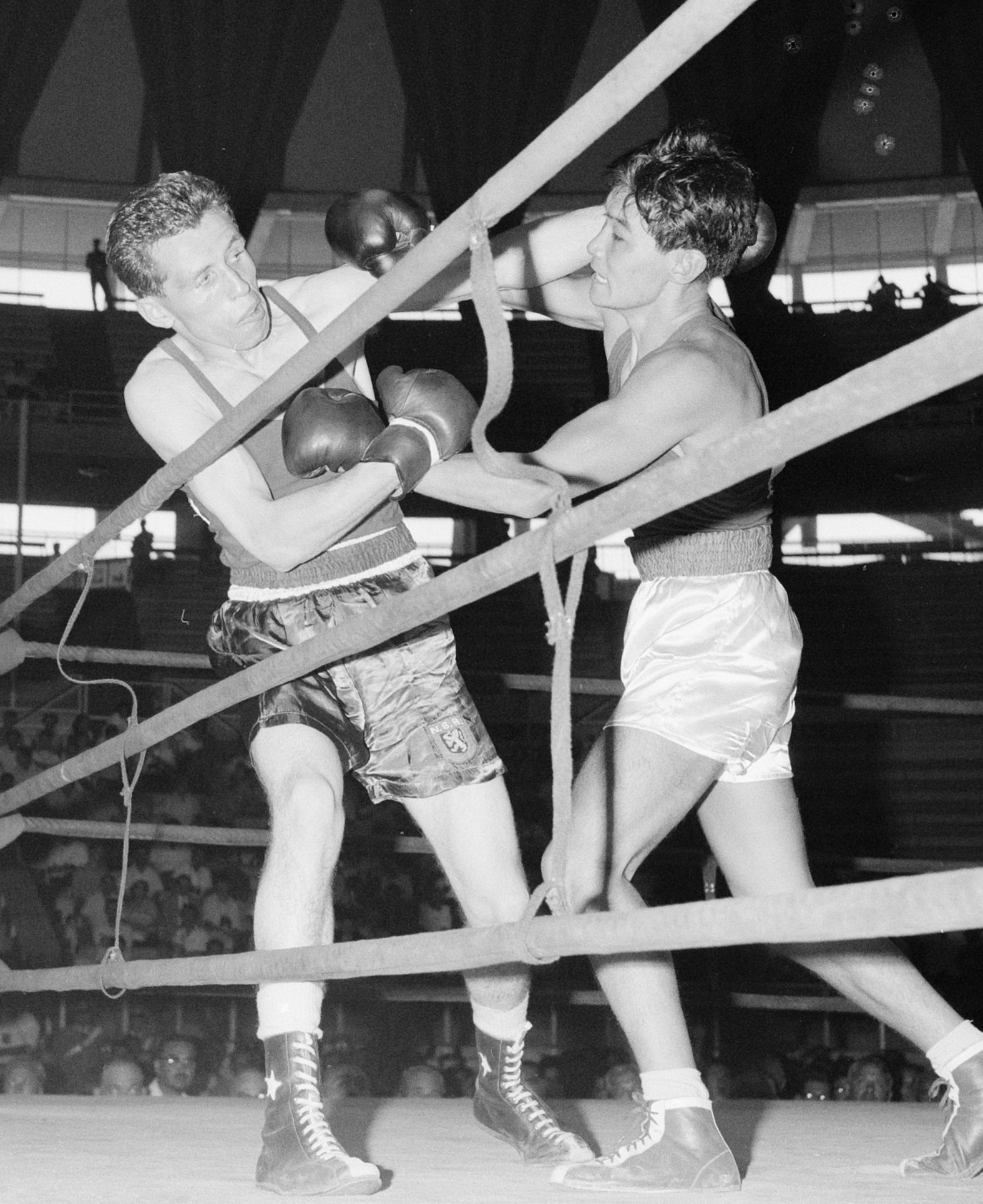
- Barannikov (right) vs Wim Gerlach at the 1960 Games

Personal information
- Born: 4 July 1938 Ulan-Ude, Russian SFSR, Soviet Union
- Died: 29 November 2007 (aged 69) Ulan-Ude, Russia
- Height: 1.60 m (5 ft 3 in)
- Weight: 60 kg (130 lb)

Sport
- Sport: Boxing
- Club: Burevestnik, Moscow
Medal record
Representing Soviet Union
Olympic Games
Silver medal – second place	1964 Tokyo	Lightweight
European Championships
Gold medal – first place	1965 East Berlin	Lightweight

Velikton Innokentyevich Barannikov (Russian: Виликтон Иннокентьевич Баранников; 4 July 1938 – 29 November 2007) was a Soviet boxer who competed in the lightweight category at the 1960 and 1964 Summer Olympics. In 1960 he lost to Abel Laudonio in the quarter-final. In 1964 he progressed to the final, where he lost to Józef Grudzień. He won a European title in 1965, and finished his career with a record of 228 wins out of 275 bouts. Despite his international success he never won a national title, finishing in second place in 1960–62 and 1965.

Barannikov was born in Ulan-Ude, where he started training in boxing. In 1956 he moved to Moscow and graduated from the prestigious Bauman Moscow State Technical University. After retirement, he worked as a boxing coach and referee, first in Moscow, then in Germany (ca. 1974), and after 1982 in Ulan-Ude. He was killed in a traffic incident on 29 November 2007. Barannikov was a retired lieutenant colonel.

== 1964 Olympic results ==
Below is the record of Velikton Barannikov, a lightweight boxer from the Soviet Union who competed at the 1964 Tokyo Olympics"

- Round of 64: bye
- Round of 32: defeated Luis Zuniga (Chile) by decision, 4–1
- Round of 16: defeated Adrian Blair (Australia) by decision, 5–0
- Quarterfinal: defeated Janos Kajdi (Hungary) referee stopped contest
- Semifinal: defeated Jim McCourt (Ireland) by decision, 3–2
- Final: lost to Jozef Grudzień (Poland) by decision, 0–5 (was awarded silver medal)
