= Lee Gwang-ju =

South Korean boxer

Personal information
- Nationality: South Korean
- Born: 28 July 1938 (age 86); Seoul, South Korea

Sport
- Sport: Boxing

Lee Gwang-ju (born 28 July 1938) is a South Korean boxer. He competed in the men's lightweight event at the 1960 Summer Olympics.
