= Danny O'Brien (boxer) =

Irish boxer

Personal information
- Full name: Daniel O'Brien
- Nationality: Irish
- Born: 10 July 1939; London, England
- Died: 10 July 2001 (aged 62); London, England

Sport
- Sport: Boxing

Daniel O'Brien (10 July 1939 – 10 July 2001) was an Irish boxer. He competed in the men's lightweight event at the 1960 Summer Olympics.
