= Kenji Yonekura =

Japanese boxer (1934–2023)

Personal information
- Born: Japanese: 米倉 健治; 25 May 1934 Nōgata, Fukuoka, Empire of Japan
- Died: 20 April 2023 (aged 88)
- Weight: flyweight; bantamweight

Boxing career
- Stance: Orthodox

Boxing record
- Total fights: 24
- Wins: 13
- Win by KO: 1
- Losses: 10
- Draws: 1

Kenji Yonekura (Japanese: 米倉 健司, Hepburn: Yonekura Kenji; 25 May 1934 – 20 April 2023) was a Japanese boxer who competed at the 1956 Melbourne Olympic Games in the flyweight division, and was a two-time world title challenger in the flyweight and bantamweight divisions. He later served as the president of Yonekura Boxing Gym.

== Amateur career ==
Yonekura saw the United States Armed Forces' boxing fights in the Itazuke Air Base, which was his first encounter with boxing. Yonekura began boxing at the age of a high school student. He was training and sparring with Yoshio Shirai under Alvin Rober Cahn's guidance.

Yonekura won the All-Japan Amateur Boxing Championships in the flyweight division in 1956, and represented Japan at the 1956 Summer Olympics in Melbourne, while studying at Meiji University. He won on points over Phachon Muangson in the second round match, and lost on points to René Libeer in the quarterfinals. He also participated in the Seattle Golden Gloves in 1957, and compiled an amateur record of 71–7 (19 KOs) before turning professional.

== Professional career ==
Yonekura made his professional debut under his real name Kenji Yonekura, written as 米倉 健治, in an eight-round bout in June 1958. Before his official debut, he made an exhibition match against the Japanese flyweight champion Sadao Yaoita as a welcome bout for the NBA's public relations manager. He was awarded Japan's Fight of the Year and Technical Award in his debut year. His ring name was changed into 米倉 健志, pronounced the same, during his professional career. He captured the vacant Japanese flyweight title in January 1959.

His first world title shot against Pascual Pérez in the flyweight division, which was postponed three days due to rain, ended in a unanimous decision loss after being knocked down in the second round, in front of 9,000 spectators at the Tokyo Metropolitan Gymnasium in August 1959. However, as Yonekura had been highly expected to be the winner of it as a former Olympian, its audience rating was 88.0 percent. Yonekura was featured on the front covers of not only boxing-related periodical s such as (Japan's) Boxing Gazette, Puroresu & Boxing, and Weekly Sports: Fight, but also various magazines such as Weekly Shōnen Magazine, Weekly Yomiuri Sports, Weekly Sankei Sports, and Olympic Gahō, as a handsome superstar.

Yonekura moved up in weight division to capture the OPBF bantamweight title in January 1960. In his second world title shot in the bantamweight division in May of that year, he lost to José Becerra via a split decision while being watched by 17,000 spectators at the Korakuen Baseball Stadium. From 1960 through 1961, he made an expedition to Mexico and fought four times in Tijuana and Mexico City, but was defeated in all those fights. After defending the OPBF title four times, he lost on points in his fifth defense in October 1962, and hung up his gloves.

== Later activities ==
After his retirement as a boxer, he opened Yonekura Boxing Gym in Tokyo in 1963, and acted as its president, promoter, manager, and trainer. He also served as the president of Japan Pro Boxing Association (JPBA) for three years from 1986 to 1989. Yonekura Boxing Gym has so far brought up fifty champions including five world champions i.e. Kuniaki Shibata, Guts Ishimatsu, Shigeo Nakajima, Hideyuki Ohashi, and Hiroshi Kawashima. The gym has provided a boxing television program Excite Boxing under the auspices of the TV Asahi on sky-A sports+ etc. In March 1995, Yonekura received the Distinguished Service Award in Sports from the education minister at the time, Kaoru Yosano.

== Death ==
Yonekura died on 20 April 2023, at the age of 88.

== Bibliography ==
- Boxing Magazine editorial department, ed. (31 May 2002). 日本プロボクシング史 世界タイトルマッチで見る50年 (Japan Pro Boxing History – 50 Years of World Title Bouts) (in Japanese). Tokyo, Japan: Baseball Magazine Sha Co., Ltd. pp. 81, 152, 299. ISBN 978-4-583-03695-3.
- Boxing Beat editorial department (15 June 2011). MACC Publications Inc (ed.). 飯田覚士の直撃トーク 第99回ゲスト 米倉健司さん. Ironman. Boxing Beat (in Japanese) (special issue). Tokyo, Japan: Fitness Sports Co., Ltd.: 78–80.
