= Kicha Poonphol =

Thai boxer

Personal information
- Nationality: Thai
- Born: 27 May 1936 (age 88); Bangkok, Thailand

Sport
- Sport: Boxing

Kicha Poonphol (born 27 May 1936) is a Thai boxer. He competed in the men's flyweight event at the 1960 Summer Olympics. At the 1960 Summer Olympics, he lost to Paul Chervet of Switzerland.
