= Harry Campbell (boxer) =

American boxer

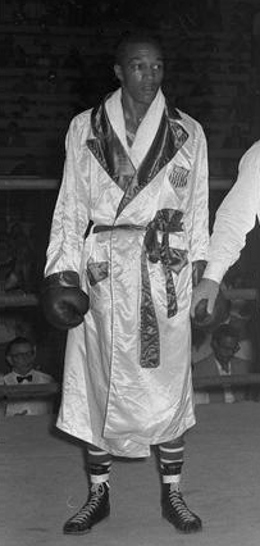
- Harry Campbell at the 1960 Olympics

Personal information
- Born: January 7, 1938 Detroit, U.S.
- Died: May 16, 1961 (aged 23) San Francisco, U.S.
- Height: 1.73 m (5 ft 8 in)
- Weight: Lightweight

Boxing career

Boxing record
- Total fights: 7
- Wins: 5
- Win by KO: 4
- Losses: 2
- Draws: 0

Harry Campbell (January 7, 1938 – May 16, 1961) was an American lightweight boxer. As an amateur he competed for the U.S. Army and was selected for the 1960 Summer Olympics, where he lost in the quarterfinal to the eventual silver medal winner Sandro Lopopolo. After the Olympics he turned professional with an amateur record of 106 wins out of 112. He won his first four professional bouts by knockout, but then lost twice to Al Medrano. In the second fight Campbell led in the first rounds, but in the tenth was knocked down twice and collapsed after the final bell. He never regained consciousness, and died shortly afterwards, despite an extensive brain surgery. At the time of his death he was studying business administration at the San Jose State University.
