= Gaetano Curcetti =

Italian boxer

Personal information
- Born: 29 June 1947 (age 79) Foggia, Italy
- Height: 151 cm (4 ft 11 in)
- Weight: 48 kg (106 lb)

Sport
- Sport: Boxing

Gaetano Curcetti (born 29 June 1947) is a retired Italian amateur boxer. He competed in the 1972 Summer Olympics in the light flyweight division, but was eliminated in the first bout. His elder brother Paolo was also an Olympic boxer.

== 1972 Olympic results ==
Below is the record of Gaetano Curcetti, an Italian light flyweight boxer who competed at the 1972 Munich Olympics

- Round of 32: lost to Kadir Syed Abdul (Singapore) by third-round technical knockout
