= John Caldwell (boxer) =

Irish boxer (1938–2009)

Medal record

Men's boxing

Representing Ireland

Olympic Games
Bronze medal – third place	1956 Melbourne	Flyweight

John Caldwell (7 May 1938 – 10 July 2009) was an Irish boxer who was only 18 and youngest member of Irish boxing team when he won the bronze medal in the flyweight (– 51 kg) division at the 1956 Summer Olympics in Melbourne. He beat the Australian favourite in the quarter finals but lost to the eventual Russian gold medalist in the semifinals.

Caldwell was considered an adept fighter whose class and skill saw him claim a medal in 1956 and the world bantamweight crown defeating World Champion Alphonso Halami at Wembley on Tuesday 31 October 1961. He enjoyed a successful career as an amateur and professional in which he contested 275 bouts, winning on all but ten occasions.

== Background ==
Born in Belfast's Cyprus Street in 1938 Caldwell to John Caldwell and Bridget Caldwell(nee Maguire) he was drawn to the world-famous Immaculata Club at an early age. Caldwell's natural talent came to the attention of trainer Jack McCusker and he rose to prominence throughout Ireland.

== 1956 Summer Olympics ==
By 1956, the Falls Road boxer held both the junior and senior Irish flyweight titles and a place on the Irish team at the Melbourne 1956 Summer Olympics was assured. "We were away for six weeks and went to San Francisco and then stopped off in Honolulu on the way to Australia ... [I] was very young at the time and at just eighteen I was considered to be the baby of the team. The athlete Maeve Kyle looked after us all and it was the most successful set of Irish boxers ever to go to an Olympics as we won four bronze medals. But it was such an honour to be picked and I was so overjoyed to be representing Ireland on such a stage."

In his opening bout, Caldwell was afforded a bye. His next opponent, Yaishwe (from Burma) was knocked out in the third round. In the quarterfinal, Caldwell beat on points Warner Batchelor, an Australian, who had been the favourite for the gold medal. However, in the semi-final, he lost out to Romanian Mircea Dobrescu and had to content himself with a bronze medal.

On his return, Caldwell was welcomed back to his native Cyprus Street. "The whole street was out to cheer me on my return to Belfast and to have stood on that podium in Melbourne with my medal just made me so proud". The calling to the paid ranks was not far off. In January 1958, he fought his last unpaid fight in Belfast's St Mary's Hall.

== Professional career ==
Caldwell moved to Scotland to begin his professional career. Glasgow was to be the base from where Caldwell, under the management of Sammy Docherty, set out on a new era. In his first bout, a two-round stoppage of Englishman Billy Downer signalled the start of John's rise through the ranks. As Caldwell recalled, the training regime he followed required discipline, self-control and dedication. "In Glasgow, I attended mass at half-six every morning ... [A]fter that, I would take to the hills outside the city for the running and stamina training. I had to watch my diet and keep myself right that it was really tough going. My exercise routines were so varied and beneficial that the Glasgow Celtic manager Jimmy McGrory asked me to go along and help the team out."

After six successful bouts in Scotland, Caldwell made his return to Belfast where he out pointed the Spaniard Esteban Martin in late 1958. His career continued to flourish and two years later he claimed the British flyweight title when knocked out the holder Frankie Jones at the King's Hall. With a Lonsdale Belt to his name, Caldwell became a natural contender for higher honours. In due course, he moved up a weight to bantamweight and a world and European title fight was arranged with the French-Algerian fighter Alphonse Halimi.

The fight, which took place in London in May 1961, went the full distance and Caldwell was awarded the points decision to become the first Irishman since Rinty Monaghan in 1948 to win a world title. The fight was remembered by Caldwell. "Halimi was very, very dangerous man and a hard hitter ...[H]is was constantly at me and I couldn't take my eyes off him for a split second – the fight was one of the hardest of my career. I remember that I knocked him down in the last round and got the decision in the end. I was on top of the world and knew that it had been a great achievement."

As champion, Caldwell won two further bouts before defeating Halimi on points in a rematch at Wembley. In February 1962, a unification bout for the bantamweight title of the world was arranged for São Paulo in Brazil, where Caldwell was to face the legendary Eder Jofre. The Brazilian gradually got on top to stop Caldwell in the tenth. Caldwell, who had been accompanied by his father on the trip, spoke of his memories. "Eder Jofre was the greatest bantamweight and the hardest-hitter for his weight of all time ... [I] remember the place was packed to the rafters and there were many thousands locked outside the arena. As it turned out, it was my first defeat as a professional and it was hard to take." While Caldwell sought to regain his title, a chance to guarantee a rematch with Jofre turned up rather closer to home.

== Caldwell v Gilroy ==
North Belfast's Freddie Gilroy had been a friend and rival of Caldwell in both the amateur and professional ranks. Gilroy had made a name for himself in the world bantamweight division and a clash with Caldwell for the British and Empire titles was set for the King's Hall on Saturday, 20 October 1962. The prize at stake was a crack at Jofre and a record crowd of 15,000 were in attendance. Gilroy, the underdog, won the fight when Caldwell was forced to retire despite dominating the fight and well ahead on points with a cut eye at the end of the ninth round. For the victor, there was to be no crack at Jofre, only speculation of a rematch, which would have been a promoter's dream. However, the rematch never took place as Gilroy retired after the King's Hall clash.

Gilroy is on the record as saying that in his view the fight was a needless one that should never have taken place. There is no doubt that the media hyped the occasion as a grudge match between North Belfast's Gilroy and West Belfast's Caldwell. For Caldwell, due to the damage his eyes received during the fight, it was a bout that signalled the waning of his career.

"I thought truly that I was ahead when the fight was stopped and I really wanted a rematch with Freddie ... [I] had a feeling though when I saw him afterwards that he would never fight me again and I was proved right in the end. In that fight, I suffered very severe cut eyes and after that I was always having difficulty with my eyes."

== Professional boxing record ==
29 Wins (14 KOs), 5 Losses
Res.	Record	Opponent	Type	Round, Time	Date	Location	Notes
Loss	29–5–1	(United Kingdom) Monty Laud	PTS	10 (10)	1965-10-12	(United Kingdom) Hotel Metropole Sporting Club, Brighton, Sussex	
Loss	29–4–1	(United Kingdom) Alan Rudkin	TKO	10 (15)	1965-03-22	(United Kingdom) Ice Rink, Nottingham, Nottinghamshire	For commonwealth Bantamweight Title and BBBofC British Bantamweight Title
Win	29–3–1	(Nigeria) Orizu Obilaso	PTS	8 (8)	1999-10-22	(United Kingdom) Hilton Hotel, Mayfair, London	
Draw	28–3–1	(Scotland) Jackie Brown	PTS	10 (10)	1964-11-11	(United Kingdom) Ice Rink, Paisley, Scotland	
Win	28–3	(Spain) Rafael Fernandez	PTS	8 (8)	1964-10-05	(United Kingdom) National Sporting Club, Piccadilly, London	
Win	27–3	(United Kingdom) George Bowes	TKO	7 (15)	1964-03-05	(United Kingdom) ABC Cinema, Belfast, Northern Ireland	
Loss	26–3	(Algeria) Michael Atlan	TKO	6 (10)	1963-02-12	(United Kingdom) Royal Albert Hall, Kensington, London	cut eye stoppage.
Loss	26–2	(Northern Ireland) Freddie Gilroy	TKO	9 (15)	1962-10-20	(United Kingdom) Kings Hall, Belfast, Northern Ireland	For vacant commonwealth Bantamweight Title and BBBofC British Bantamweight Title
Win	26–1	(Italy) Federico Scarponi	PTS	10 (10)	1962-04-10	(United Kingdom) Empire Pool, Wembley, London	
Loss	25–1	(Brazil) Eder Jofre	TKO	10 (15)	1962-01-18	Ginásio Estadual do Ibirapuera, São Paulo, Brazil	Lost world bantamweight title
Win	25–0	(Algeria) Alphonse Halimi	PTS	15 (15)	1961-10-31	(United Kingdom) Empire Pool, Wembley, London	Retained world bantamweight title
Win	24–0	(Spain) Juan Cardenas	KO	8 (10)	1961-09-04	(United Kingdom) Sophia Gardens Pavilion, Cardiff, Wales	
Win	23–0	(France) Pierre Vetroff	PTS	10 (10)	1961-08-28	(United Kingdom) Market Hall, Carmarthen, Wales	
Win	22–0	(Algeria) Alphonse Halimi	PTS	15 (15)	1961-05-30	(United Kingdom) Empire Pool, Wembley, London	Won vacant world bantamweight title
Win	21–0	(France) Jacques Jacob	TKO	5 (10)	1961-03-30	(United Kingdom) Colston Hall, Bristol, England	
Win	20–0	(Italy) Angelo Rampin	TKO	8 (8)	1961-01-31	(United Kingdom) Royal Albert Hall, Kensington, London	
Win	19–0	(France) Christian Marchand	TKO	7 (10)	1960-11-26	(United Kingdom) King's Hall, Belfast, Northern Ireland	
Win	18–0	(Scotland) Frankie Jones	KO	3 (15)	1960-10-08	(United Kingdom) King's Hall, Belfast, Northern Ireland	Won BBBofC British Flyweight Title
Win	17–0	(France) Rene Libeer	PTS	10 (10)	1960-05-31	(United Kingdom) Empire Pool, Wembley, London	
Win	16–0	(Finland) Risto Luukkonen	PTS	10 (10)	1960-02-23	(United Kingdom) Empire Pool, Wembley, London	
Win	15–0	(Spain) Young Martin	KO	3 (10)	1960-02-09	(United Kingdom) Streatham Ice Rink, Streatham, London	
Win	14–0	(Italy) Salvatore Manca	TKO	6 (10)	1959-10-28	(United Kingdom) Kelvin Hall, Glasgow, Scotland	
Win	13–0	(Italy) Salvatore Manca	PTS	10 (10)	1959-10-03	(United Kingdom) King's Hall, Belfast, Northern Ireland	
Win	12–0	(Italy) Giacomo Spano	PTS	10	1959-06-17	(United Kingdom) Firhill Park, Glasgow, Scotland	
Win	11–0	(France) Pierre Rossi	PTS	8 (8)	1959-04-15	(United Kingdom) Kelvin Hall, Glasgow, Scotland	
Win	10–0	(Spain) Francisco Carreno	TKO	4 (10)	1959-03-07	(United Kingdom) King's Hall, Belfast, Northern Ireland	
Win	9–0	(France) Henri Schmid	PTS	8 (8)	1959-02-05	(United Kingdom) Kelvin Hall, Glasgow, Scotland	
Win	8–0	(France) Simon Carnazza	TKO	5 (10)	1959-01-10	(United Kingdom) King's Hall, Belfast, Northern Ireland	
Win	7–0	(France) Esteban Martin	PTS	10 (10)	1958-11-29	(United Kingdom) Ulster Hall, Belfast, Northern Ireland	
Win	6–0	(Spain) Juanito Cid	KO	5 (8)	1958-10-29	(United Kingdom) Kelvin Hall, Glasgow, Scotland	
Win	5–0	(South Africa) Dennis Adams	PTS	8 (8)	1958-09-17	(United Kingdom) Kelvin Hall, Glasgow, Scotland	
Win	4–0	(France) Michel Lamora	TKO	4 (8)	1958-06-18	(United Kingdom) Kelvin Hall, Glasgow, Scotland	
Win	3–0	(Italy) Moncef Fabri	PTS	8 (8)	1958-05-21	(United Kingdom) Kelvin Hall, Glasgow, Scotland	
Win	2–0	(United Kingdom) Eddie Barraclough	KO	1 (6)	1958-03-05	(United Kingdom) Kelvin Hall, Glasgow, Scotland	
Win	1–0	(United Kingdom) Billy Downer	KO	2 (6)	1958-02-05	(United Kingdom) Kelvin Hall, Glasgow, Scotland	Professional debut

== Commonwealth title and retirement ==
Caldwell's career continued. However, his problem with cut eyes came back to haunt him just three months later when he was forced to retire from a bout with Michel Atlan at the Albert Hall. Caldwell won the Commonwealth and British bantamweight titles in 1964 with a win over George Bowes at Belfast's Ritz Cinema. A year later, with two further victories under his belt, he was forced to retire in the tenth round against Alan Rudkin in a defence of his titles. At age 27, Caldwell had had enough of professional boxing. In 1965, he lost his final bout on points to Monty Laud in Nottingham and returned to his trade as a pipe-fitter in Belfast.

When asked about his views on contemporary boxing, Caldwell replied: "It was an entirely different game to the one that I was involved in fifty years ago ... [Y]ou had to be totally dedicated back then, clean-living and prepared to make a lot of sacrifices to survive at the top. It was a game for hard and skilful men and if you couldn't stick the pace you were found out very easily."

== Death ==
Caldwell died following a long battle with cancer, aged 71.

== See also ==
- List of British bantamweight boxing champions
- List of British flyweight boxing champions
