= Dagfinn Næss =

Norwegian boxer

Dagfinn Arthur Næss (8 January 1934 – 5 July 2008) was a Norwegian boxer.

He was born in Bergen. He took nine individual national championships between 1953 and 1966, representing the club Bergen-Sparta. His classes were lightweight and light welterweight. At the 1960 Summer Olympics he finished in tied ninth place. He was an honorary member of the Norwegian Boxing Federation.

He died in 2008.
