= Federico Bonus =

Filipino boxer

Personal information
- Nationality: Filipino
- Born: January 24, 1936 (age 90) Tarlac City, Tarlac, Philippine Commonwealth

Sport
- Sport: Boxing

Federico "Sugar" Bonus (born January 24, 1936) is a Filipino boxer. He competed in the men's flyweight event at the 1956 Summer Olympics.
