= Salah Shokweir =

Egyptian boxer

Personal information
- Nationality: Egyptian
- Born: 16 October 1929; El Mahalla El Kubra, Egypt

Sport
- Sport: Boxing

Salah Shokweir (born 16 October 1929) is an Egyptian boxer. He competed in the men's lightweight event at the 1960 Summer Olympics.
