= SK Bergen Sparta =

Norwegian sports club

- Full name: Sportsklubben Bergen Sparta
- Founded: 18 November 1925

Sportsklubben Bergen Sparta is a Norwegian sports club from Bergen, founded in 1925 and named after Sparta. It has sections for amateur boxing, and formerly for association football.

It was a member of Arbeidernes Idrettsforbund before the Second World War. It was founded on 18 November 1925.

Well-known amateur boxers include Dagfinn Næss (1960 Olympian). The King's Cup in boxing was taken by Dagfinn Næss in 1954, 1958, 1960 and 1961.

The men's football team played in the Third Division, the fourth tier of Norwegian football, in 1994, 1995, 1997 and 2004. They played home matches at Varden. This section is currently defunct.
