= Mircea Dobrescu =

Romanian boxer (1930–2015)

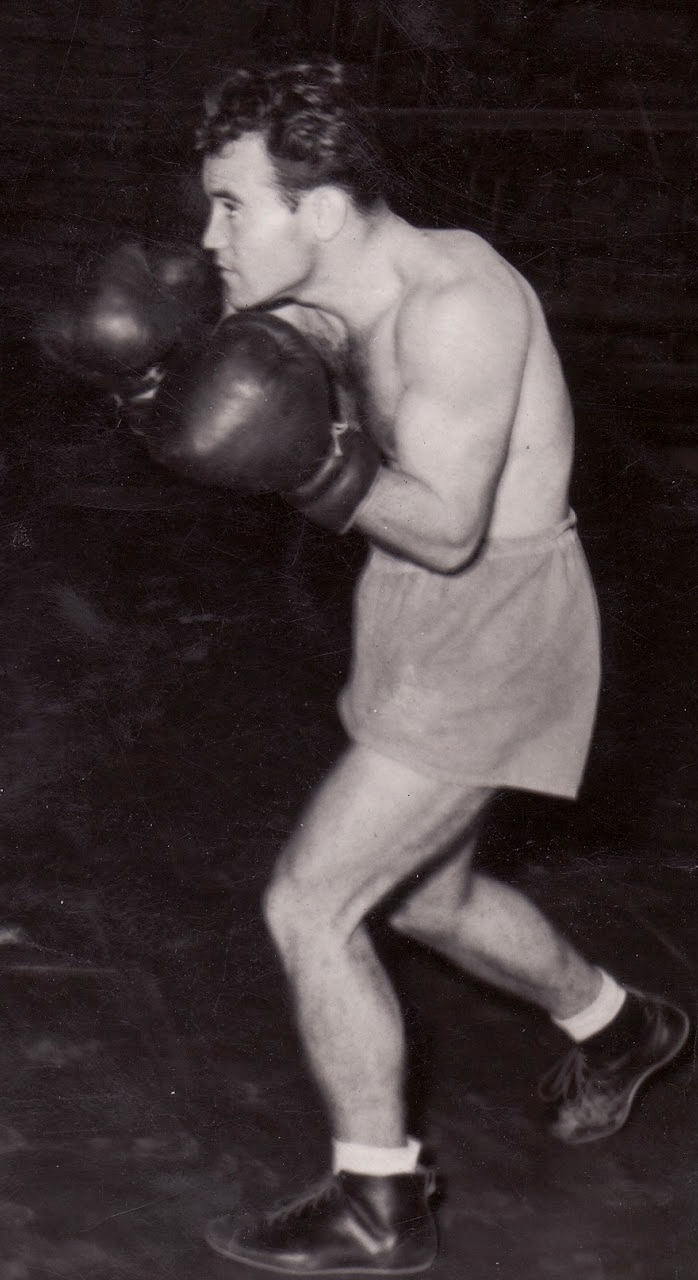

Personal information
- Born: 5 September 1930 Cotorca, Glodeanu-Siliștea, Buzău County, Romania
- Died: 6 August 2015 (aged 84)
- Height: 150 cm (4 ft 11 in)
- Weight: 51 kg (112 lb)

Sport
- Sport: Boxing
- Club: Steaua București
- Coached by: Constantin Nour
Medal record
Representing Romania
Romania National Amateur Boxing Championships
Silver medal – second place	1952 Bucharest	-51 kg
Gold medal – first place	1953 Galați, Brașov and Bucharest	-51 kg
Gold medal – first place	1955 Bucharest	-51 kg
Gold medal – first place	1957 Bucharest	-51 kg
Gold medal – first place	1959 Bucharest	-51 kg
Gold medal – first place	1960 Bucharest	-51 kg
Gold medal – first place	1961 Bucharest	-51 kg
Olympic Games
Silver medal – second place	1956 Melbourne	-51 kg
European Amateur Boxing Championships
Silver medal – second place	1955 West Berlin	-51 kg
Silver medal – second place	1957 Prague	-51 kg

Mircea Dobrescu (5 September 1930 – 6 August 2015) was a flyweight boxer from Romania. He competed at the 1952, 1956, and 1960 Olympics and won a silver medal in 1956, losing to Terence Spinks on points. He won two more silver medals at the European championships in 1955 and 1957.

Dobrescu took up boxing in 1948 and retired in 1982 after winning six national flyweight titles, winning in 1953 against his brother Constantin. He inherited glaucoma from his mother, which resulted in blindness during his last years.

== 1956 Olympic results ==
Below are Mircea Dobrescu's results from the flyweight division at the 1956 Olympic boxing tournament in Melbourne:

- Round of 16: defeated Federico Bonus (Philippines) on points
- Quarterfinal: defeated Ray Perez (USA) on points
- Semifinal: defeated John Caldwell (Ireland) on points
- Final: lost to Terence Spinks (Great Britain) on points (was awarded silver medal)
