= Sergei Sivko =

Russian boxer

Personal information
- Born: 7 June 1940 Tula, Russian SFSR, Soviet Union
- Died: 10 November 1966 (aged 26) Moscow, Russian SFSR, Soviet Union

Sport
- Sport: Boxing
- Club: Trudovye Rezervy
Medal record
Representing the Soviet Union
Olympic Games
| Silver medal – second place | 1960 Rome | -51 kg |
European Amateur Championships
| Gold medal – first place | 1961 Belgrade | -54 kg |

Sergey Aleksandrovich Sivko (Russian: Сергей Александрович Сивко, 7 June 1940 – 10 November 1966) was a Russian amateur boxer. In 1960 he won the Soviet flyweight title and an Olympic silver medal. Next year he moved to the bantamweight division and won the Soviet and European titles. He died aged 26 in 1966. Since 1975, an annual boxing tournament has been held in his honor in Moscow.
