= Vladimir Stolnikov =

Russian boxer

Personal information
- Born: 12 March 1934 Leningrad, Soviet Union
- Died: 30 March 1990 (aged 56) Leningrad, Soviet Union

Sport
- Sport: Boxing
- Club: Trudovye Rezervy, St. Petersburg
Medal record
Representing the Soviet Union
European Championships
Bronze medal – third place	1959 Lucerne	-51 kg
Silver medal – second place	1961 Belgrade	-51 kg

Vladimir Grigoryevich Stolnikov (Russian: Владимир Григорьевич Стольников, 12 March 1934 – 30 March 1990) was a Russian amateur flyweight boxer who won two medals at the European championships in 1959 and 1961. He competed at the 1956 Summer Olympics, but lost in the third bout to the eventual winner Terence Spinks.

Stolnikov took up boxing at the age 14 and won the national flyweight title in 1955 and 1957–58. He retired in 1961 with a record of 161 wins out of 186 bouts.

== 1956 Olympic results ==
Below are the results of Vladimir Stolnikov, a flyweight boxer from the Soviet union who competed at the 1956 Melbourne Olympics:

- Round of 32: defeated Edgar Basel (West Germany) on points
- Round of 16: defeated Salvatore Burruni (Italy) on points
- Quarterfinal: lost to Terrence Spinks (Great Britain) on points
