= Wim Gerlach =

Dutch boxer

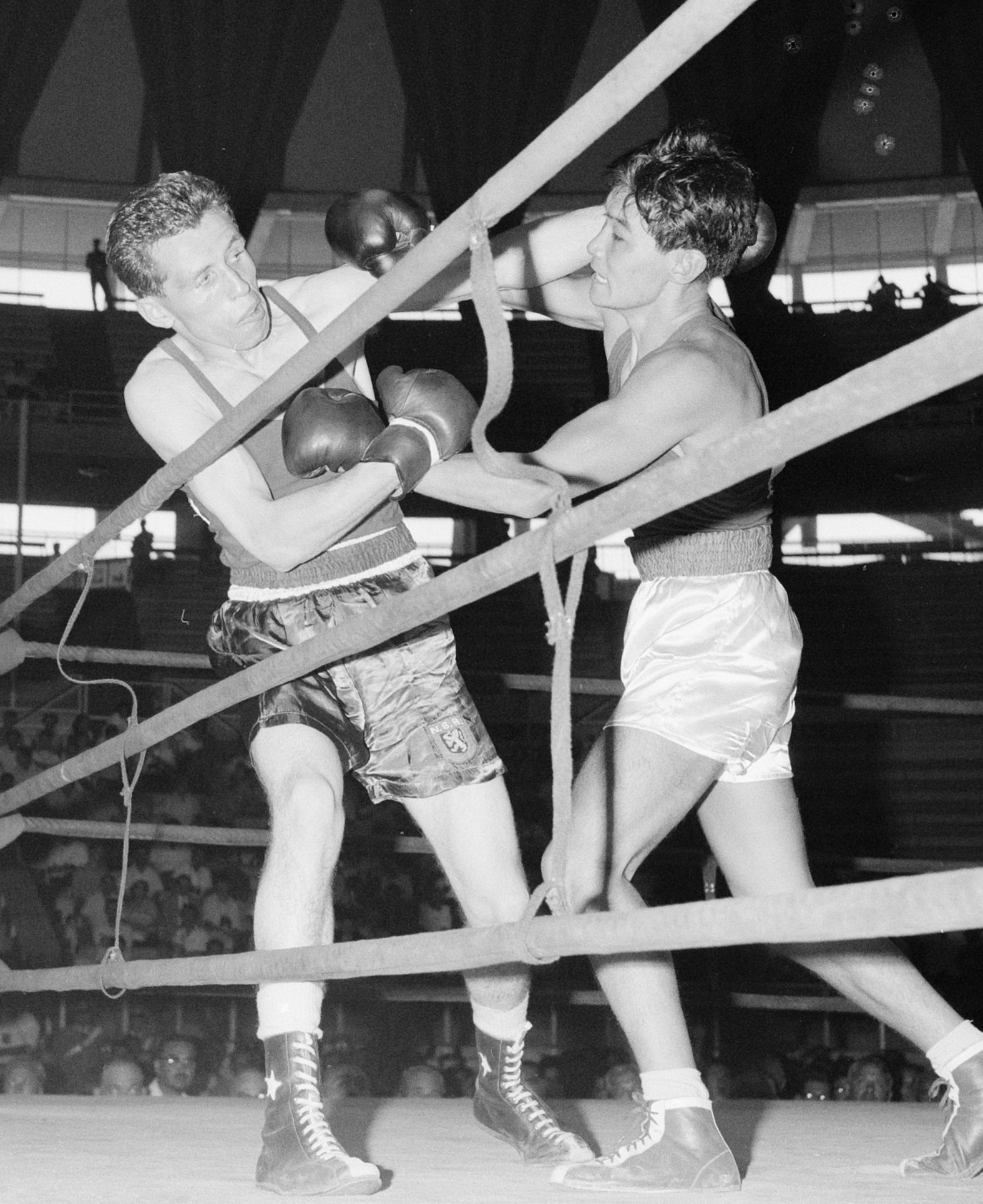
- Gerlach (left) vs Velikton Barannikov at the 1960 Games

Personal information
- Born: 24 June 1935 Groningen, the Netherlands
- Died: 14 June 2007 (aged 71) Groningen, the Netherlands
- Height: 1.74 m (5 ft 9 in)
- Weight: 60 kg (130 lb)

Sport
- Sport: Boxing
- Club: Abelsma, Groningen

Willem Aaldert "Wim" Gerlach (24 June 1935 – 14 June 2007) is a retired boxer from the Netherlands. He competed at the 1960 and 1964 Summer Olympics in the lightweight and light welterweight classes, respectively, and was eliminated in the first round at both games.

Since 2007, the "Wim Gerlach Memorial" competition is carried out annually in late November in Delfzijl.
