= Iosif Mihalic =

Romanian boxer (1938–2004)

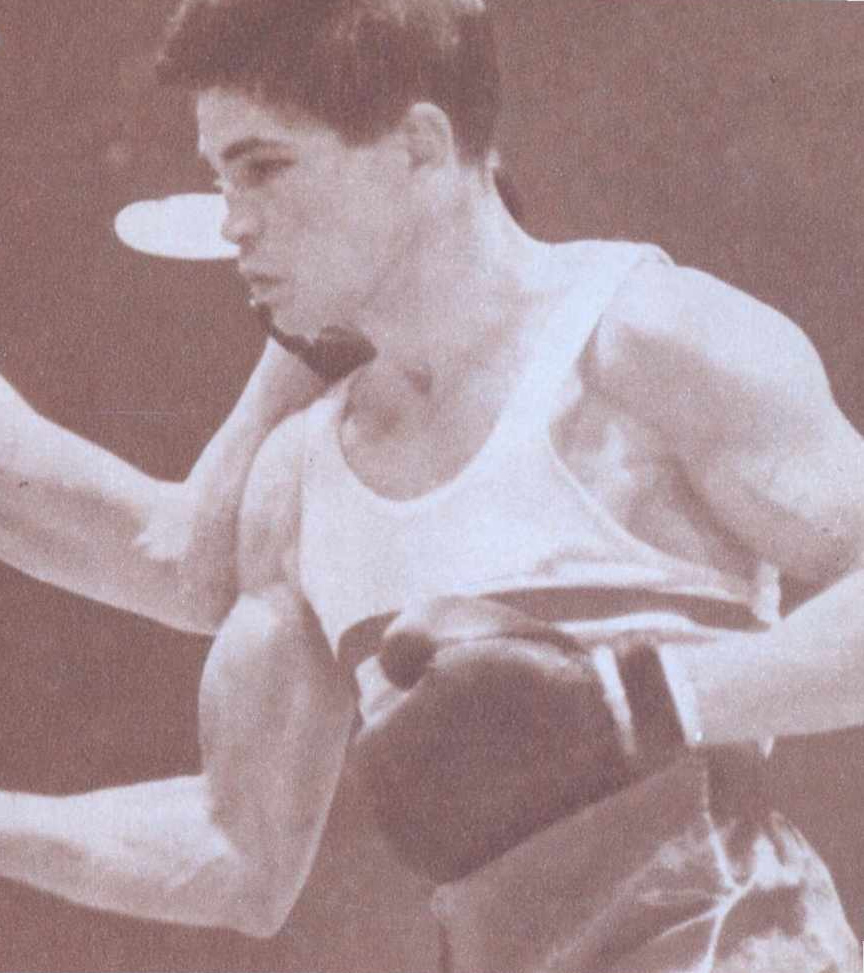
- Iosif Mihalic in 1965

Personal information
- Nationality: Romanian
- Born: 13 November 1938 Cluj-Napoca, Romania
- Died: 2004 (aged 65–66)

Sport
- Sport: Boxing
Medal record
Representing Romania
Romania National Amateur Boxing Championships
Gold medal – first place	1957 Bucharest	Featherweight
Gold medal – first place	1959 Bucharest	Lightweight
Gold medal – first place	1960 Bucharest	Lightweight
Gold medal – first place	1961 Bucharest	Light welterweight
Gold medal – first place	1962 Bucharest	Light welterweight
Gold medal – first place	1963 Bucharest	Light welterweight
Silver medal – second place	1964 Bucharest	Light welterweight
Silver medal – second place	1966 Bucharest	Light welterweight
European Amateur Championships
Bronze medal – third place	1959 Lucerne	Lightweight

Iosif Mihalic (13 November 1938 – 2004) was a Romanian boxer. He competed at the 1960 Summer Olympics and the 1964 Summer Olympics.
