= René Libeer =

French boxer

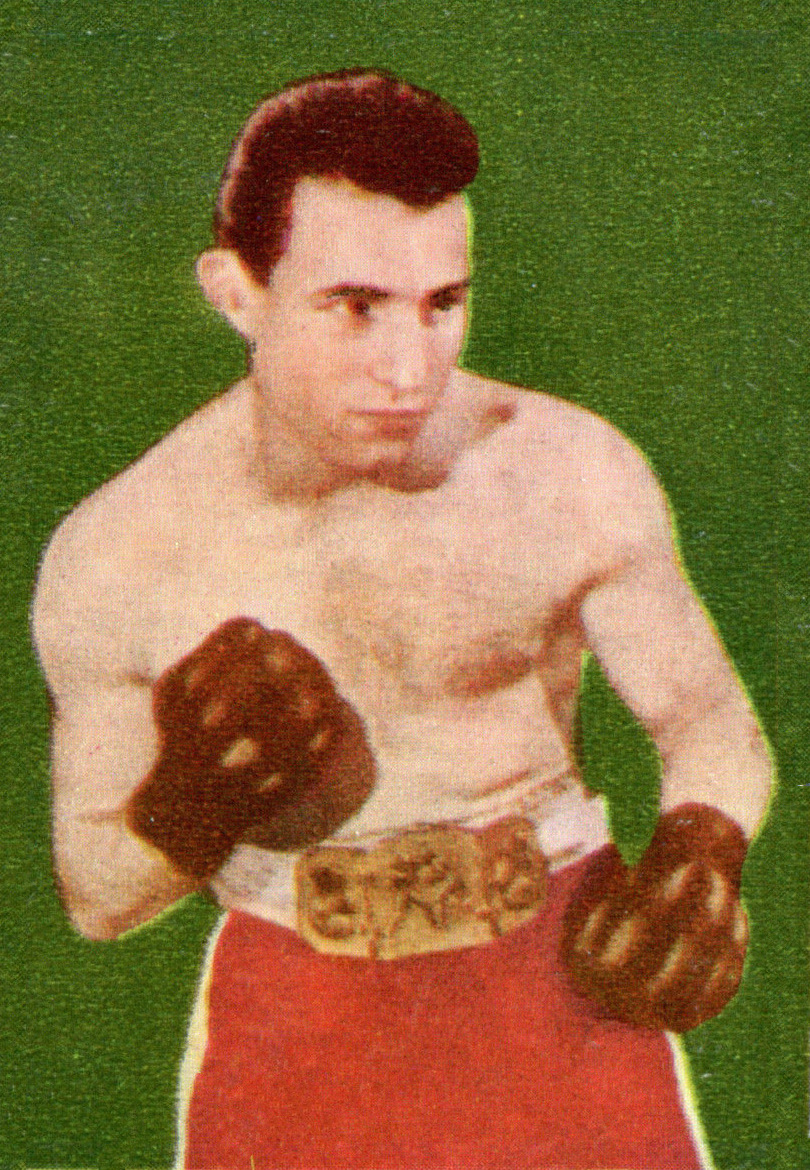

Personal information
- Nationality: France
- Born: 28 November 1934 Roubaix, France
- Died: 12 November 2006 (aged 71) Roubaix, France
- Height: 1.57 m (5 ft 2 in)
- Weight: Flyweight

Boxing career
- Stance: Orthodox

Boxing record
- Total fights: 39
- Wins: 27
- Win by KO: 13
- Losses: 8
- Draws: 4
Medal record
Representing France
Olympic Games
Bronze medal – third place	1956 Melbourne	Flyweight
European Championships
Bronze medal – third place	1957 Prague	-51 kg

René Jules Libeer (28 November 1934 – 12 November 2006) was a French flyweight boxer. Competing as an amateur he won bronze medals at the 1956 Summer Olympics and 1957 European Championships. Next year he turned professional and in 1965 won the vacant European title against Paul Chervet. After defending it three times he lost it in 1967 to Fernando Atzori. Their rematch the same year ended in a draw, after which Libeer retired from boxing.

== 1956 Olympic results ==
Below is the record of René Libeer, a French flyweight boxer who competed at the 1956 Melbourne Olympics:

- Round of 32: bye
- Round of 16: defeated Pyo Hyeon-gi (South Korea) on points
- Quarterfinal: defeated Kenji Yonekura (Japan) on points
- Semifinal: lost to Terence Spinks (Great Britain ) on points (was awarded bronze medal)
