= Kazimierz Paździor =

Polish boxer

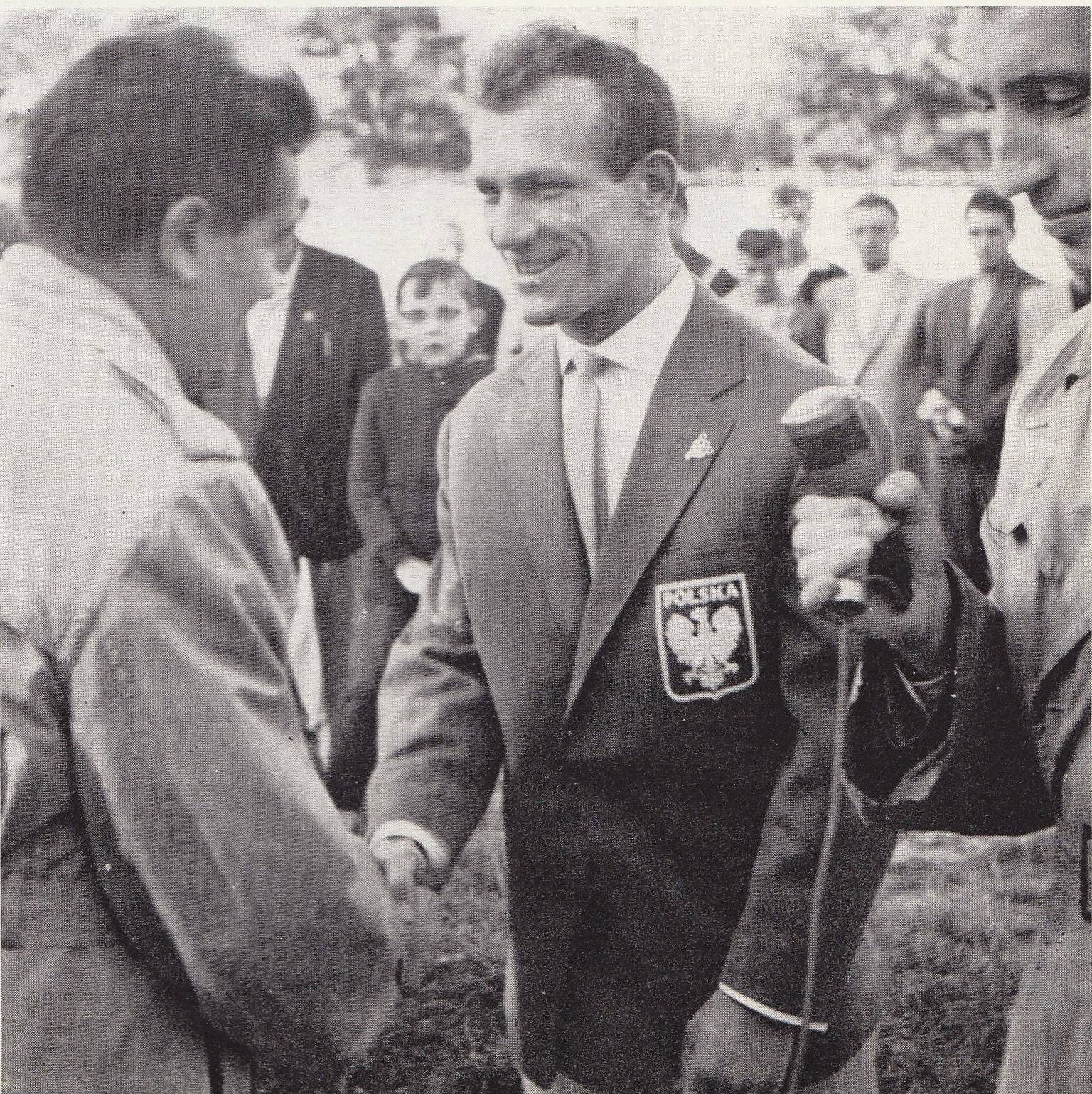
- Paździor in 1975

Personal information
- Born: 4 March 1935 Radom, Poland
- Died: 24 June 2010 (aged 75) Wrocław, Poland
- Height: 171 cm (5 ft 7 in)

Sport
- Sport: Boxing
- Club: Broń Radom
Medal record
Representing Poland
Olympic Games
Gold medal – first place	1960 Rome	-60 kg
European Amateur Championships
Gold medal – first place	1957 Prague	-60 kg

Kazimierz Sylwester Paździor (4 March 1935 – 24 June 2010) was a Polish amateur lightweight boxer. He won the European title in 1957, the Polish title in 1958 and 1960, and an Olympic gold medal in 1960. He retired in 1961 with a record of 179 wins, 3 draws and 12 losses.

Paździor worked as an economist at a metal plant in his home town of Radom. After retiring from competitions he remained active in boxing as a coach. In 1990 he received the Aleksander Reksza Boxing Award.
