= Ferenc Kellner =

Hungarian boxer

Personal information
- Nationality: Hungarian
- Born: 27 October 1932; Budapest, Hungary
- Died: 17 April 2010 (aged 77); Budapest, Hungary

Sport
- Sport: Boxing

Ferenc Kellner (27 October 1932 – 17 April 2010) was a Hungarian boxer. He competed in the men's lightweight event at the 1960 Summer Olympics.
