= Paolo Curcetti =

Italian boxer (1936–2020)

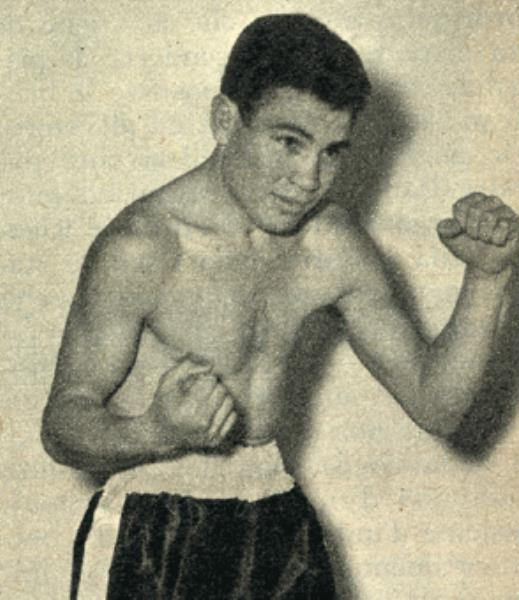

Personal information
- Born: 8 July 1936 Foggia, Italy
- Died: 17 April 2020 (aged 83)
- Height: 156 cm (5 ft 1 in)
- Weight: 51 kg (112 lb)

Sport
- Sport: Boxing

Paolo Curcetti (8 July 1936 – 17 April 2020) was an Italian boxer. As an amateur he won the Italian flyweight title in 1957, 1959 and 1960 and competed in the 1960 Summer Olympics, where he was eliminated in the third bout. Between 1961 and 1964 he fought professionally in the bantamweight division, and had a record of 12 wins (5 by knockout), 3 losses and one draw. His younger brother Gaetano was also an Olympic boxer.

== 1960 Olympic results ==
Below is the record of Paolo Curcetti, an Italian flyweight boxer who competed at the 1960 Rome Olympics:

- Round of 64: defeated Frank Kisekka (Uganda) by decision, 5–0
- Round of 32: defeated Jo Horny (Belgium) by decision, 5–0
- Round of 16: lost to Abdel Moneim El-Gindy (Egypt) by decision, 1–4
