= Abel Laudonio =

Argentine boxer

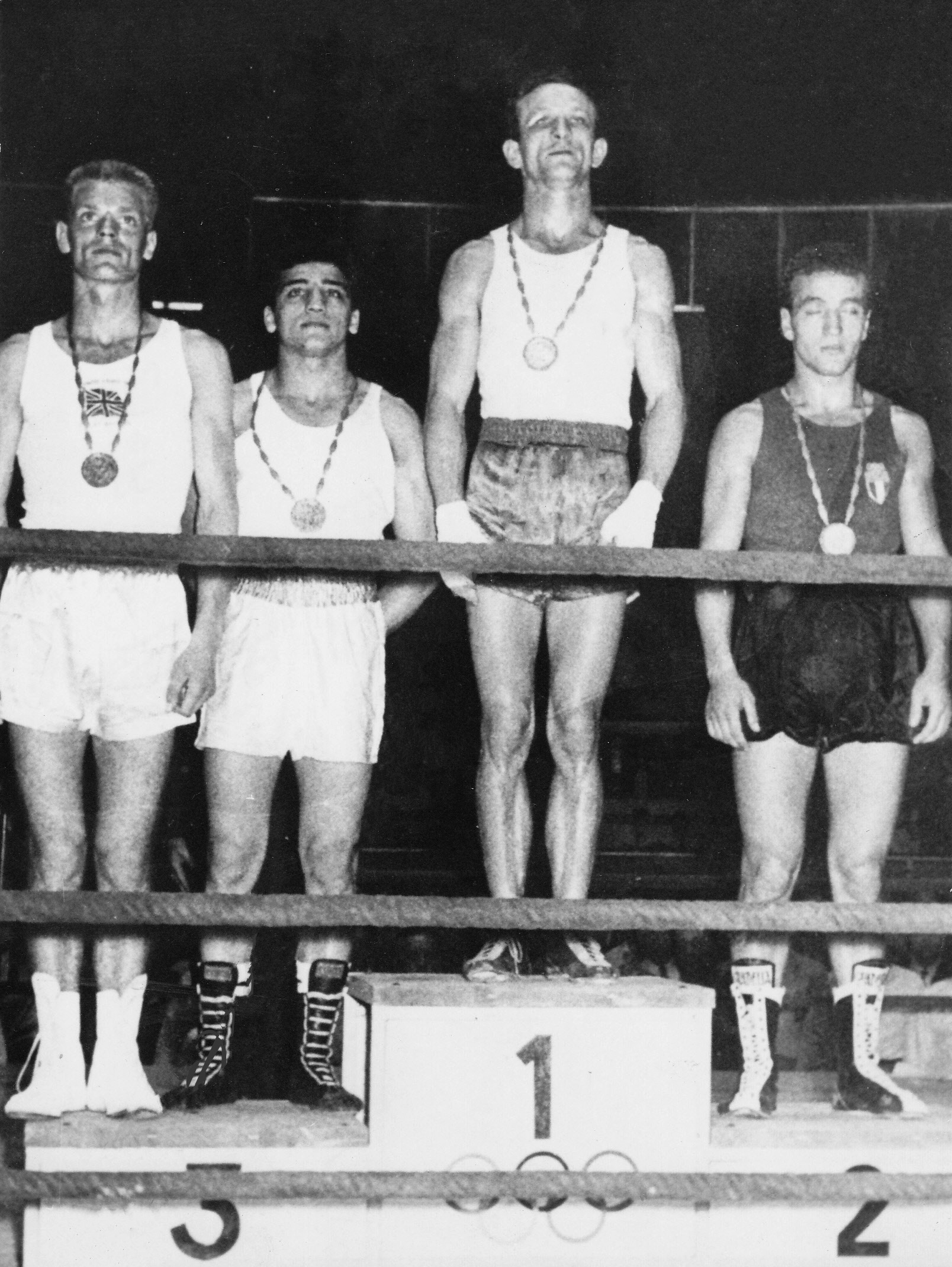
- Laudonio (2nd left) at the 1960 Olympics

Personal information
- Full name: Abel Ricardo Laudonio
- Born: 30 August 1938 Buenos Aires, Argentina
- Died: 12 August 2014 (aged 75) Buenos Aires, Argentina
- Height: 168 cm (5 ft 6 in)

Sport
- Sport: Boxing
Medal record
Representing Argentina
Olympic Games
Bronze medal – third place	1960 Rome	-60 kg
Pan American Games
Gold medal – first place	1959 Chicago	-60 kg

Abel Ricardo Laudonio (30 August 1938 – 12 August 2014) was an Argentine lightweight boxer. As an amateur he competed in the 1956 and 1960 Olympics and won a bronze medal in the lightweight division in 1960. In 1961, he turned professional and in 1965 challenged Nicolino Locche for the South American lightweight title, but lost by decision. Laudonio retired the same year with a record of 48 wins (37 by knockout), 6 losses, and 2 draws. He later ran a fitness center in Buenos Aires.

== 1956 Olympic Results ==
Below is the record of Abel Laudino, an Argentine flyweight boxer who competed at the 1956 Melbourne Olympics:

- Round of 32: bye
- Round of 16: lost to Terence Spinks (Great Britain) on points

== Later years ==
In 2004, Laudonio was diagnosed with Alzheimer's disease. He had a stroke in 2009, and died from another stroke in 2014.
