= Belousov =

Belousov (feminine: Belousova), or Beloussov (feminine: Beloussova), is a Russian patronymic surname formed from the nickname Belous (which also became a surname) derived from Belye Usy (Russian: Белые Усы) "White Moustache".

Notable people with the surname include:

- Aleksandr Belousov (born 1952), Russian general
- Alexandr Belousov (born 1998), Moldovan footballer
- Andrey Belousov (born 1959), Russian politician, economist, and minister of defense (2024–present)
- Anna Belousova (born 1996), Russian swimmer
- Boris Mikhailovich Belousov (1934–2026), Russian/Soviet statesman
- Boris Pavlovich Belousov (1893–1970), Soviet chemist
- Denys Byelousov (born 1996), Ukrainian footballer
- Dmitri Belousov (born 1980), Russian footballer
- Georgi Belousov (born 1990), Russian ice hockey player
- Igor Belousov (1928–2005), Soviet politician
- Ilya Belousov (born 1978), Russian football player
- Irina Belousova (born 1954), Ukrainian politician
- Leonid Georgievich Belousov (1909–1998), Soviet flying ace
- Ludmila Belousova (1935–2017), Russian figure skater
- Mikhail Belousov (born 1953), Russian politician
- Mikhail Ignatievich Belousov (1894–1956), Soviet sniper
- Nikita Belousov (born 2002), Russian football player
- Piotr Belousov (1912–1989), Soviet, Russian painter, graphic artist, and art teacher
- Sergei Beloussov (born 1971), birth name of Serg Bell, Russian-Singaporean businessman
- Sergei Romanovich Belousov (born 1957), Russian specialist in Chinese ideology and culture
- Sergey Belousov (born 1990), Russian association footballer
- Sonya Belousova (born 1990), Russian-American composer, pianist and recording artist
- Vadim Belousov (born 1960), Russian politician
- Valentin Danilovich Belousov (1925–1988), Moldovan/Soviet mathematician
- Valeriy Belousov (born 1970), Russian decathlete
- Valery Belousov (1948–2015), Russian ice hockey player and coach
- Valery Belousov (boxer), (born 1940), Russian boxer
- Vladimir Belousov (1907–1990), Soviet geologist
- Vladimir Belousov (footballer) (born 1947), Russian football player and coach
- Vladimir Belousov (ski jumper) (born 1946), Soviet ski jumper
- Yaroslav Belousov (born 1991), Russian political prisoner
- Yevgeny Belousov (born 1962), Soviet luger
- Yuri Leonidovich Belousov (1945–2000), Soviet and Russian researcher and engineer
- Zhenya Belousov (1964–1997), Soviet and Russian pop singer

== See also ==
- 34552 Belousova, asteroid
- Belousov Point
- Kapitan Belousov
- P. Belousov Central Park of Culture and Recreation, in Tula
- Soviet icebreaker Kapitan Belousov
