= Belous =

Belous is a Russian surname meaning "a person with a white moustache". The Ukrainian surname Bilous has a similar etymology. Polish equivalent Białowąs, or less commonly Białous. Notable people with the surname include:

- Charles Belous (1907–1966), Romanian-American attorney and politician
- Ilya Belous (born 1995), Russian football player
- Sergei Belous (born 1970), Russian football player
- Serghei Belous (born 1971), Moldovan football player
- Vasile Belous (1988–2021), Moldovan boxer
- Victoria Belous (born 1984), Moldovan politician
- Vladimir Belous (born 1993), Russian chess Grandmaster

== See also ==
- Belousov (patronymic surname)
