= Bilous =

Bilous (Ukrainian: Білоус) is a Ukrainian surname meaning "a person with a white moustache". Russian names of the same derivation include Belous and Belousov (patronymic surname). The Polish-language equivalent is Białowąs, or less commonly Białous.

Notable people with the surname include:

- Deron Bilous (born 1975), Canadian politician
- Finn Bilous (born 1999), New Zealand freestyle skier
- Len Bilous (born 1948), American soccer player and coach
- Serhiy Bilous (born 1999), Ukrainian footballer
- Jon Bilous (born 1996), American photographer
