= Białous =

Białous is a Polish surname, a version of Białowąs or Belous. Notable people with the surname include:

- Franciszek Białous (1901–1980), Polish microbiologist
- Ryszard Białous (1914–1942), Polish scoutmaster
