= Klokovo air base =

Airport in Russia

Klokovo Tula
- Tula, Tula Oblast in Russia
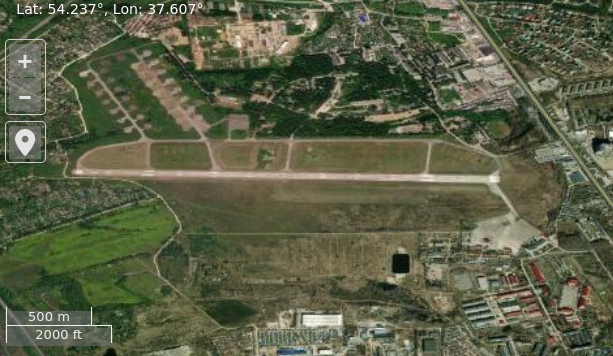
- Satellite imagery of Klokovo air base

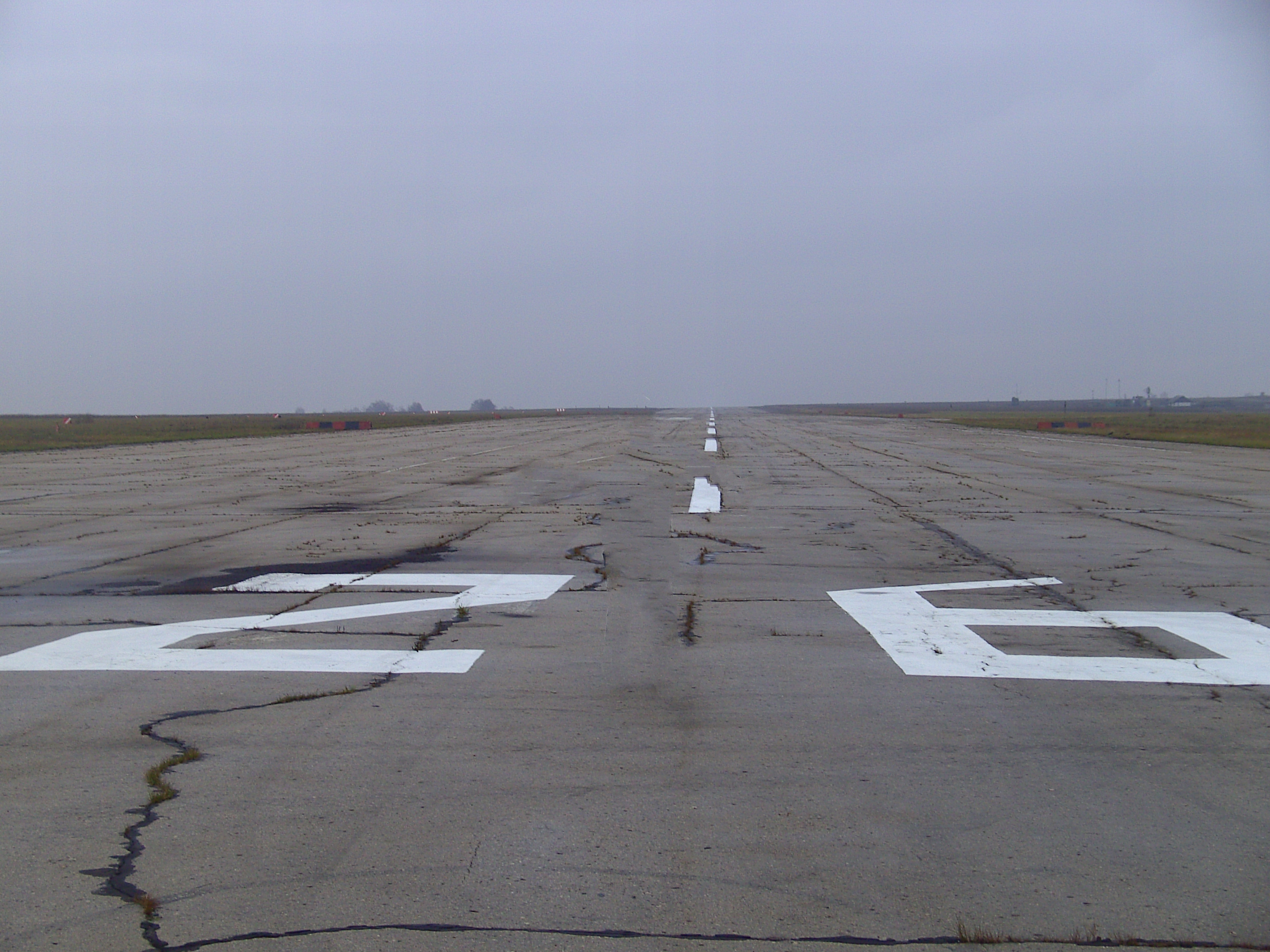

Site information
- Type: Air Base
- Owner: Ministry of Defence
- Operator: Russian Aerospace Forces

Location
- Shown within Tula Oblast Klokovo (Russia)
- Coordinates: 54°14′12″N 37°36′24″E

Site history
- Built: 1946
- In use: 1946 - present

Airfield information
- Identifiers: IATA: TYA
- Elevation: 219 metres (719 ft) AMSL
Runways
Direction	Length and surface
08/26	1,850 metres (6,070 ft) Concrete

Klokovo (Russian: Клоково) (IATA: TYA) is an air base in Russia on north fringe of Tula. It has been home to 374 OVTAP (374th Independent Military Transport Aviation Regiment) flying Ilyushin Il-76 (ASCC: Candid) and Antonov An-22 (ASCC: Cock) large cargo planes, of the 12th Military Transport Aviation Division "Mginskaya Red Banner".

A scholastic regiment of Tambov military aircraft school (Aero L-29 Delfín (ASCC: Maya)) was based there. The runway was used by the military together with a civil airport, which closed in 1992.

The base was used by the 374th Military-Transport Aviation Regiment between 1946 and 1975 and is currently home to the 490th Independent Helicopter Regiment.

== See also ==
- List of military airbases in Russia
