= Tula Urban Okrug =

Tula Urban Okrug (Russian: городско́й о́круг Ту́ла) is a municipal formation (an urban okrug) in Tula Oblast, Russia, one of the seven urban okrugs in the oblast. Its territory comprises the territories of two administrative divisions of Tula Oblast—Leninsky District and Tula City Under Oblast Jurisdiction.

The municipal formation previously established within the borders of Tula City Under Oblast Jurisdiction was granted urban okrug status by the Law #553-ZTO of Tula Oblast of March 11, 2005. On June 22, 2014, the territory of Leninsky Municipal District was merged into the urban okrug.
