= Białowąs (surname) =

Białowąs or Bialowas is a Polish surname. Notable people with the surname include:

- Dwight Bialowas (born 1952), Canadian ice hockey player
- Frank Bialowas (born 1969), Canadian ice hockey player
- Gregor Bialowas (born 1959), Austrian weightlifter
- Ryszard Białowąs (1947–2004), Polish basketball player

== See also ==
- Białowąs, village in Poland
- Białous
- Bilous
- Belous
