= Yuri Leonidovich Belousov =

Russian materials scientist

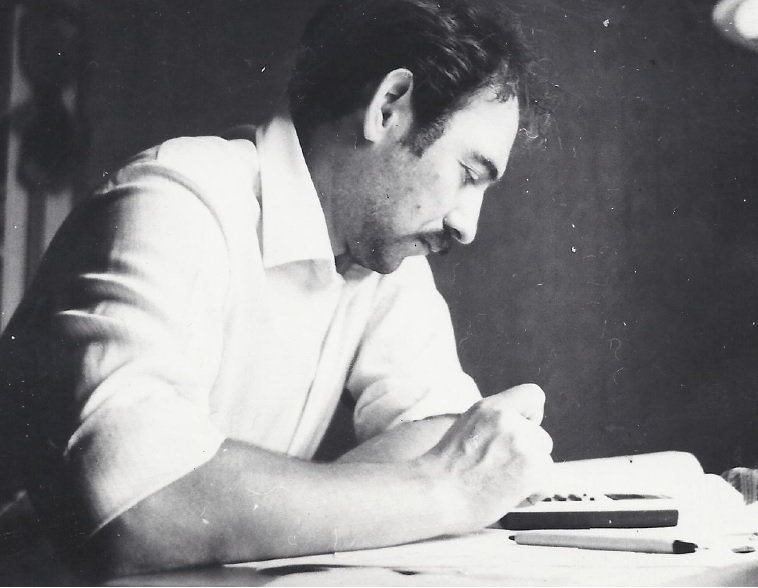
- Born: Yuri Leonidovich Belousov; November 14, 1945; Troitsk, Chelyabinsk Oblast, USSR
- Died: May 4, 2000 (aged 54); Yekaterinburg), Sverdlovsk Oblast
- Citizenship: USSR, Russian Federation
- Education: (Ural State Technical University
- Awards: Silver Medal of VDNKh (Russia), 1983
- Scientific career
- Fields: Glass technology, Physical chemistry of Silicate materials, Glass-ceramic

Yuri Leonidovich Belousov (Russian: Ю́рий Леони́дович Бело́усов; November 14, 1945 Chelyabinsk Oblast, USSR — May 4, 2000, Yekaterinburg), Sverdlovsk Oblast, Russia, was a researcher and engineer in the field of Materials Science: glass and Glass-ceramic technologies.

Yuri Belousov authored or co-authored numerous books and publications, and earned more than 10 patents and inventions related to new glass-ceramic materials, colored glasses, foam glass and ceramic glazes with high thermal shock resistance for carbon containing materials.

His main achievements, which were developed in the USSR, include a unique method of glass annealing and toughening (together with O.V. Mazurin; see toughened glass, annealing (glass)), obtaining the first USSR free-dust method of sealing of glass ampoules which prevented the ingress of glass dust into medicinal ampouled preparations (in collaboration with O.V. Mazurin and others). Yuri Belousov is also the main author and creator of a theoretical method of determining viscosity of silicate melts, allowing one to perform theoretical calculations of viscosity and thus predict commercial glass, cement and slag compositions.

== Biography and early research work ==
Yuri Belousov was born in a Ural town of Troitsk, Chelyabinsk Oblast in Russian Soviet Federative Socialist Republic. His father’s family began as Ukrainian peasants (original name was Bilous) from Poltava Governorate who arrived in Ural, Russia, in the early 20th century to receive a portion of land, promised by the Stolypin reform. His maternal grandfather Gennady Beketov, a descendant of Volga Tatars following the October Revolution, was the first director one a Soviet bank in Saratov Region (now Saratov Oblast). After his death in 1921, his family moved to Ural.

In 1964, Yuri entered the Ural Polytechnic Institute (later Ural State Technical University (USTU)), Sverdlovsk (now Yekaterinburg) in the department of Glass Technology. After graduation, continued his postgraduate studies there. In 1974, he defended his doctoral thesis in the field of glass ceramics made of industrial slags. In 1975, he started to work in one of the Research Institutes of Ural where successfully developed refractory.

In 1978, his research was documented in a film by Sverdlovsk Film Studio.

In the end of 70s, he accepted an offer on work by Vilen Ivakhnyuk, an internationally recognized researcher, who made a scientific discovery, a founder and the first director of Belgorod Technological Institute of Constructional Materials (former BTISM), now Belgorod Shukhov University.

== Main achievements and inventions ==
While working in the institute in collaboration with Leningrad’s researcher O.V. Mazurin, Yu. Belousov wrote the book The Annealing and Tempering of Glass, a manual among engineers. This book, devoted to a new method of glass treatment, became a reference guide for specialists and researchers in other related industries. Based on this method, in 1988, Yu. Belousov, O.V. Mazurin and others developed USSR’s first technology of a glass dust-free method of sealing glass ampoules, which significantly decreased contamination in medicinal ampouled preparations. This invention was first introduced at one of the Soviet biopharmaceutical plants currently belonging to the Russian concern VEROPHARM.

By the end of 80s, Yuri Belousov and his colleagues resolved an issue of exploding glass sparkling wine bottles which had caused serious lacerations to workers in wine bottling facilities in Ukraine.

Yuri Belousov’s main achievement was development a method of calculating the viscosity of glassy melts based on known equations of viscosity. Before anyone else, Yu. Belousov gathered, described and compiled a data base of viscosity values of glasses and slags. Then, using Arrhenius equation, he developed the basic principles and a formulaic calculation algorithm of the viscosity of melts, which provided a fairly precise measurement. The method is based on the theoretical viscosity values of melts of binary, ternary, quaternary and more complex oxide phase diagrams of the silicate systems. It allowed to avoid the current, expensive processes for determining viscosity in practice.

Under his guidance, his post-graduate students prepared several Ph.D. theses, three of which were defended after his death.

Yuri Belousov died in 2000 in the age of 54 due to poor health.

In recognition of his great contribution to the technology of Silicate materials field, in 1983, Yuri Belousov was awarded the Silver Medal of the main Soviet state exhibition VDNKh (Russia), the Exhibition of Achievements of the People's Economy.

His daughter followed his steps: she became a professional engineer (P. Eng.) in the field of ceramics and refractories, she lives and works in Canada.

== Some publications ==
1. Belousov, Yu. L.; Pushkareva, M. V. (1993). "Yu. L. Belousov, M. V. Pushkareva. Calculation of the viscosity of glasses and melts based on rocks and industrial waste products / Glass and Ceramics, July 1993, Volume 50, Issue 7, pp 300-303". Glass and Ceramics. 50 (7): 300. doi:10.1007/BF00683668. S2CID 136975021.

2. Belousov, Yu. L.; Sopin, Yu. P. (1993). "Yu. L. Belousov, Yu. P. Sopin. Optimization of the annealing process of piece glassware / Glass and Ceramics, April 1993, Volume 50, Issue 4, pp 158-161". Glass and Ceramics. 50 (4): 158. doi:10.1007/BF00679410. S2CID 136462013.

3. Belousov, Yu. L. (1992). "Yu. L. Belousov. Reasons for the contamination of medicinal ampuled preparations with glass dust / Glass and Ceramics, July 1992, Volume 49, Issue 7, pp 342-344". Glass and Ceramics. 49 (7): 342–344. doi:10.1007/BF00677455. S2CID 138697101.

4. Belousov, Yu. L.; Firsov, V. A.; Donskoi, E. S.; Grebenyuk, D. S.; Savchenko, A. P. (1990). "Yu. L. Belousov, V. A. Firsov etc. Optimizing annealing of bottles for sparkling wines / Glass and Ceramics, January 1990, Volume 47, Issue 1, pp 7-10". Glass and Ceramics. 47: 7–10. doi:10.1007/BF00678253. S2CID 137674128.

5. Min'Ko, N. I.; Belousov, Yu. L.; Ermolenko, K. M.; Firsov, V. A. (1986). "N. I. Min'ko, Yu. L. Belousov, K. M. Ermolenko, V. A. Firsov. Foam material based on crystallized glasses / Glass and Ceramics, October 1986, Volume 43, Issue 10, pp 445-447". Glass and Ceramics. 43 (10): 445. doi:10.1007/BF00699804. S2CID 135637776.
