= Tula, Russia =

City in Tula Oblast, Russia

Tula Тула
- City
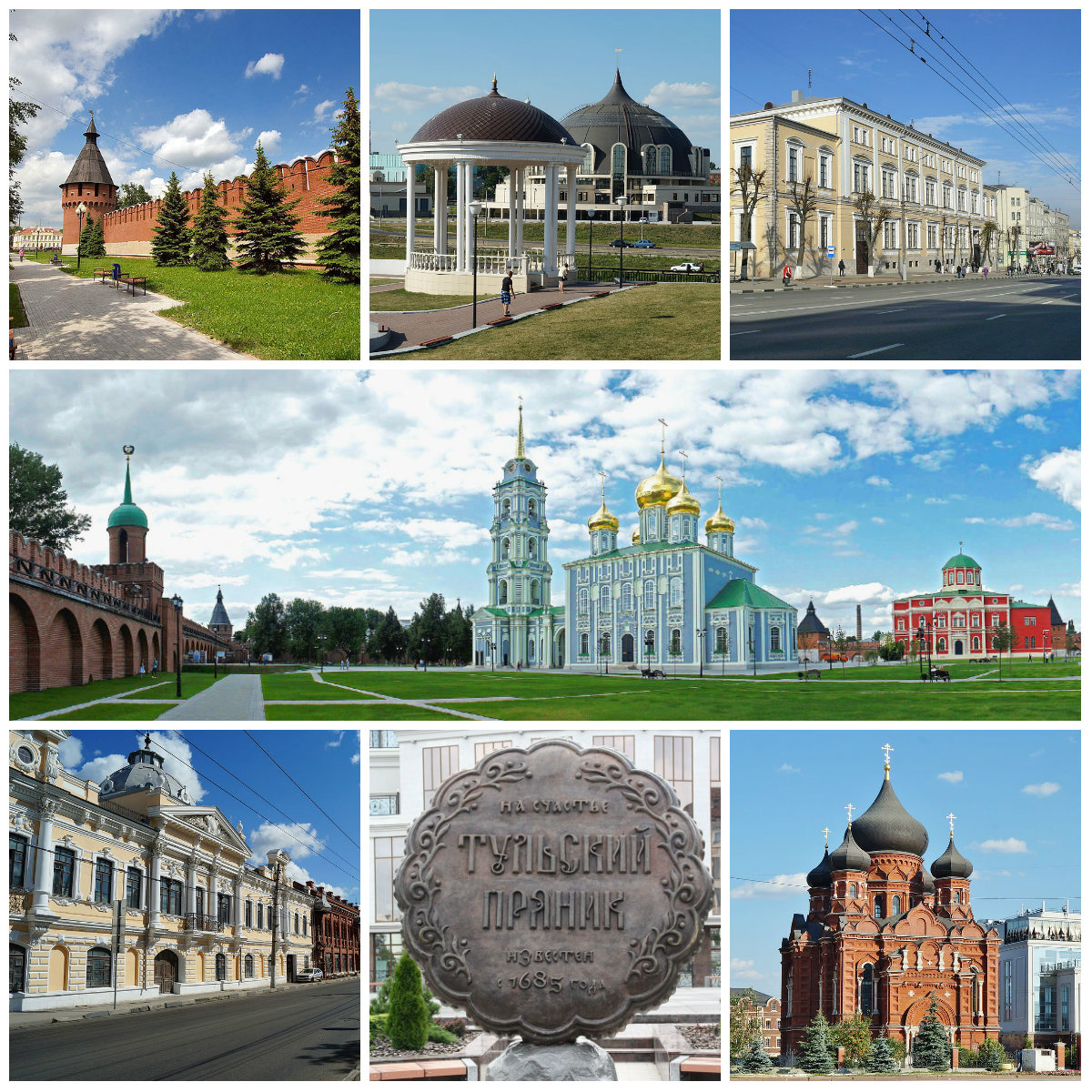
- Up: Tula Kremlin, Museum of Weapons, Assembly of the Nobility. Center: Cathedral of the Assumption of the Blessed Virgin Mary. Down: Cathedral of the Dormition at Uspensky Convent, Monument to gingerbread on Lenin Square, Administrative and production building for gingerbread trade

- Flag Coat of arms
- Anthem: Anthem of Tula
- Interactive map of Tula
- Location of Tula Tula (European Russia) Tula (Europe)
- Coordinates: 54°12′N 37°37′E
- Country: Russia
- Federal subject: Tula Oblast
- First mentioned: 1146

Government
  - Body: City Duma
  - Mayor: Alexey Erk

Area
  - Total: 153.52 km^{2} (59.27 sq mi)
- Elevation: 170 m (560 ft)

Population (2010 Census)
  - Total: 501,169
  - Estimate (2025): 456,813 (−8.9%)
  - Rank: 37th in 2010
  - Density: 3,264.5/km^{2} (8,455.1/sq mi)

Administrative status
  - Subordinated to: Tula City Under Oblast Jurisdiction
  - Capital of: Tula Oblast, Tula City Under Oblast Jurisdiction

Municipal status
  - Urban okrug: Tula Urban Okrug
  - Capital of: Tula Urban Okrug
- Time zone: UTC+3 (MSK)
- Postal code: 300000–300999
- Dialing code: +7 4872
- OKTMO ID: 70701000001
- Website: www.tula.ru

Tula (Russian: Ту́ла, IPA: [ˈtulə]) is the largest city and the administrative center of Tula Oblast in Russia, located 193 kilometers (120 mi) south of Moscow. Tula is located in the northern Central Russian Upland on the banks of the Upa River, a tributary of the Oka. At the 2010 census, Tula had a population of 501,169, an increase from 481,216 in 2002, making it the 32nd-largest city in Russia by population.

Historical population
| Year | Pop. | ±% |
|---|---|---|
| 1897 | 115,000 | — |
| 1926 | 150,331 | +30.7% |
| 1939 | 272,224 | +81.1% |
| 1959 | 315,639 | +15.9% |
| 1970 | 461,965 | +46.4% |
| 1979 | 514,008 | +11.3% |
| 1989 | 539,980 | +5.1% |
| 2002 | 481,216 | −10.9% |
| 2010 | 501,169 | +4.1% |
| 2021 | 473,622 | −5.5% |
Source: Census data

A primarily industrial city, Tula was a fortress at the border of the Principality of Ryazan. The city was seized by Ivan Bolotnikov in 1606 during the Time of Troubles and withstood a four-month siege by the Tsar's army. Historically, Tula has been a major centre for the manufacture of armaments. The Demidov family built the first armament factory in Russia in the city, in what would become the Tula Arms Plant, which still operates to this day.

Tula is home to the Klokovo air base, Tula State University, the Tula Kremlin, Tula State Museum of Weapons, and Kazanskaya Embankment. Tula has a historical association with the samovar, a metal container used to heat and boil water; the city was a major center of Russian samovar production. Yasnaya Polyana, the former home of the writer Leo Tolstoy, is located 12 kilometres (7.5 mi) southwest of Tula. Additionally, Tula is known for its imprinted gingerbread (pryanik), which has been made in Tula since the 17th century.

== Etymology ==
The name of the city is likely pre-Russian, probably of Baltic origin.

== History ==
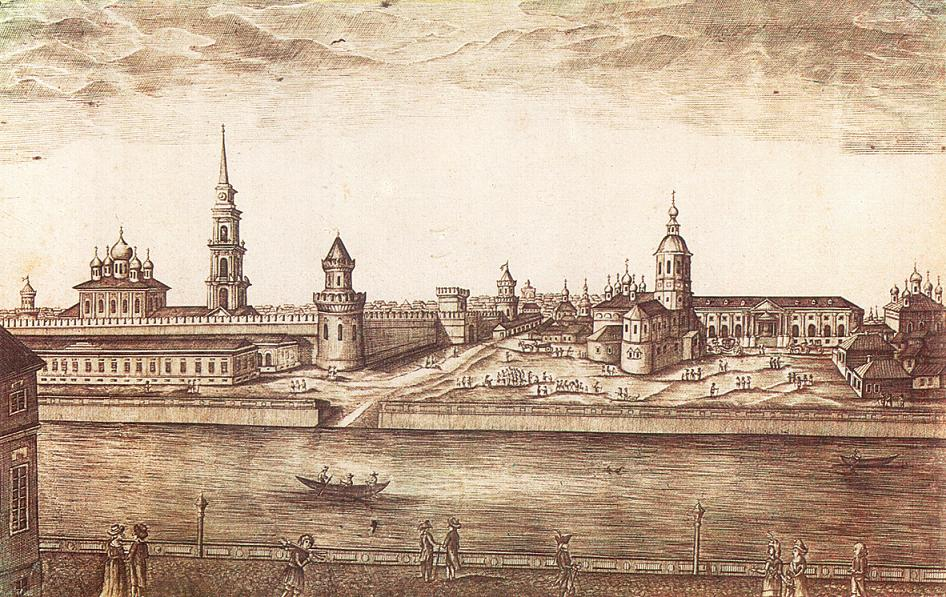
Tula in 1807

Tula was first mentioned in the Nikon Chronicle (year 1146).

In the Middle Ages, Tula was a minor fortress at the border of the Principality of Ryazan. As soon as it passed to the Grand Duchy of Moscow, a brick citadel, or kremlin, was constructed in 1514–1521. It was a key fortress of the Great Abatis Belt and successfully resisted a siege by the Tatars in 1552. In 1607, Ivan Bolotnikov and his supporters seized the citadel and withstood a four-months siege by the Tsar's army. In the 18th century, some parts of the kremlin walls were demolished. Despite its archaic appearance, the five-domed Assumption Cathedral in the kremlin was built as late as 1764.

In 1712, Tula was visited by Peter the Great, who commissioned the Demidov blacksmiths to build the first armament factory in Russia. Several decades later, Tula was turned by the Demidovs into the greatest ironworking center of Eastern Europe. The oldest museum in the city, showcasing the history of weapons, was inaugurated by the Demidovs in 1724, and Nicholas-Zaretsky Church in the city houses their family vault. The first factory to produce samovars industrially was also established there in the course of the 18th century. After the Demidovs moved the center of their manufacture to the Urals, Tula continued as a center of heavy industry, particularly in the manufacture of matériel.

In the 1890s, Ivan Savelyev, a medical orderly, became the founder of social democracy in Tula and set up a workers' study circle.

During World War II, the city was important in the production of armaments. Tula became the target of a German offensive to break Soviet resistance in the Moscow area between 24 October and 5 December 1941. According to Erik Durschmied in The Weather Factor: How Nature has Changed History, one German general reached the southwestern outskirts of Tula on 29–30 October 1941.

The heavily fortified city held out, however, and Guderian's Second Panzer Army was stopped near Tula. The city secured the southern flank during the Battle of Moscow and the subsequent counter-offensive. Tula was awarded the title Hero City in 1976. It is home to the Klokovo air base and the Tula Arms Plant.

== Administrative and municipal status ==
The Administrative divisions of Tula consists of 5 districts; Zelenivka, Privokzalny District, Proletarsky District, Tsentralny District and Sovietsky District.

Tula serves as the administrative center of the oblast. Within the framework of administrative divisions, it is incorporated as Tula City Under Oblast Jurisdiction—an administrative unit with the status equal to that of the districts. As a municipal division, the territories of Tula City Under Oblast Jurisdiction and of Leninsky District are incorporated as Tula Urban Okrug.

== Mayors ==
List of mayors of Tula since 1991:

- Sergey Kazakov (1997–2005)
- Vladimir Mogilnikov (2005–2010)
- Alisa Tolkachyova (2010–2011)
- Yevgeny Avilov (2011–2012)
- Aleksandr Prokopuk (2012–2014)
- Yuri Tskipuri (2014–2019)
- Olga Slyusareva (2019–2024)
- Alexey Erk (2024–present)

== Economy ==
For more than four centuries Tula has been known as a center of crafts and metalworking. Tula is a developed industrial center. Importance in the industrial structure of Tula are metallurgy, machinery and metal with a high share of the military-industrial complex and food manufacturing.

=== Armaments industry ===
- Almaz-Antey Concern: Scientific Production Association Strela (Russian: ОАО НПО «Стрела»)
- Splav (Russian: ОАО НПО «СПЛАВ») part of the Techmash holding of Rostec; only manufacturer of multiple rocket launchers in Russia: BM-21 Grad, BM-27 Uragan, BM-30 Smerch
- KBP Instrument Design Bureau
- Shcheglovsky Val plant (Russian: «Щегловский вал» завод): manufacturer of the Bumerang-BM for the T-15 Armata
- Tactical Missiles Corporation: TsKBA (Russian: ОАО «ЦКБА»)
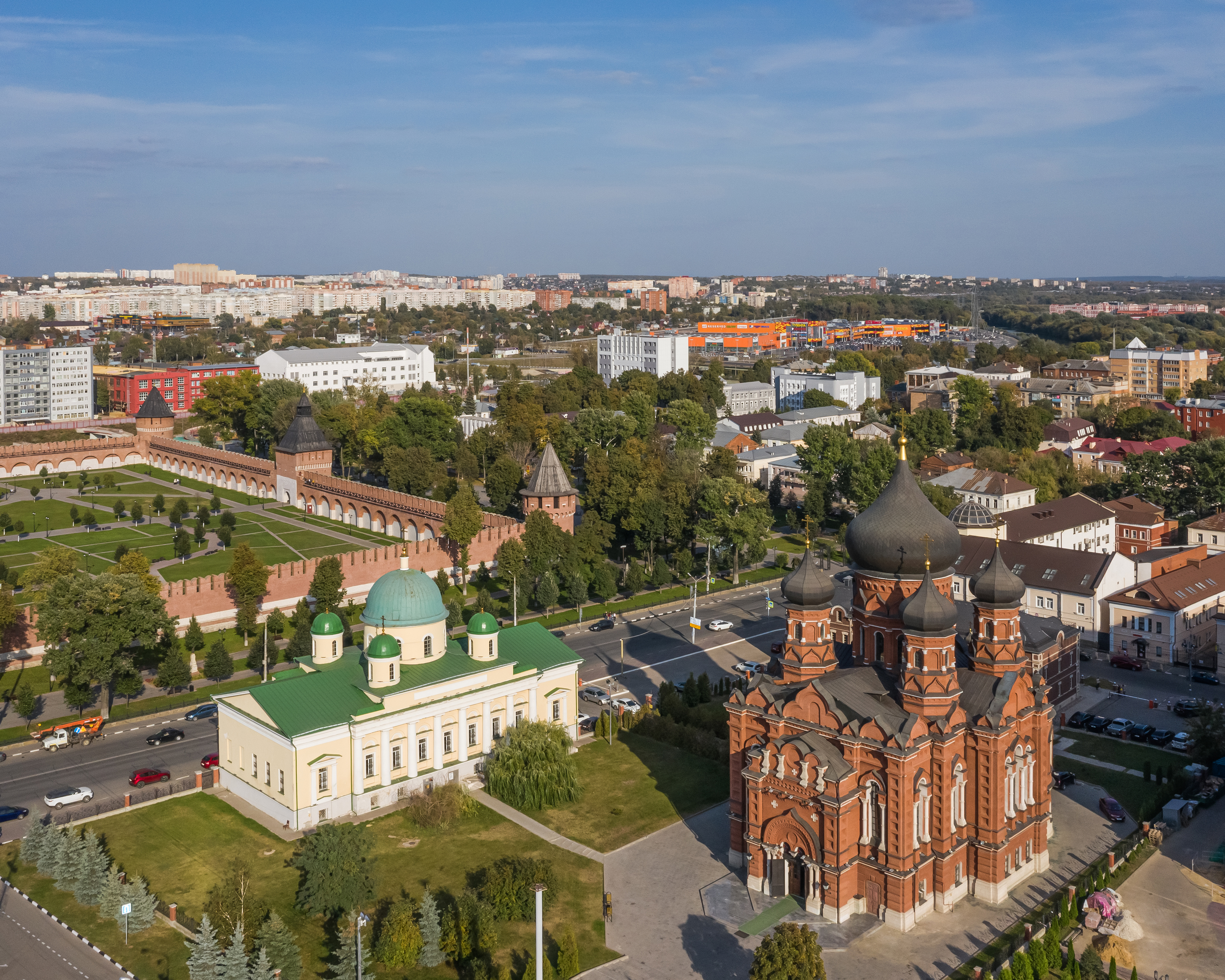
  Aerial view of Tula
- Tula Arms Plant
- Tulamashzavod
- Tula Cartridge Plant

=== Other companies ===
- Shtamp Machine-Building Plant
- Oktava
- Yasnaya Polyana: a confectionery factory established in 1973 under the holding of United Confectioners (Russian: Холдинг «Объединенные кондитеры») that produces 340 different candies including "Yasnaya Polyana"

== Culture ==
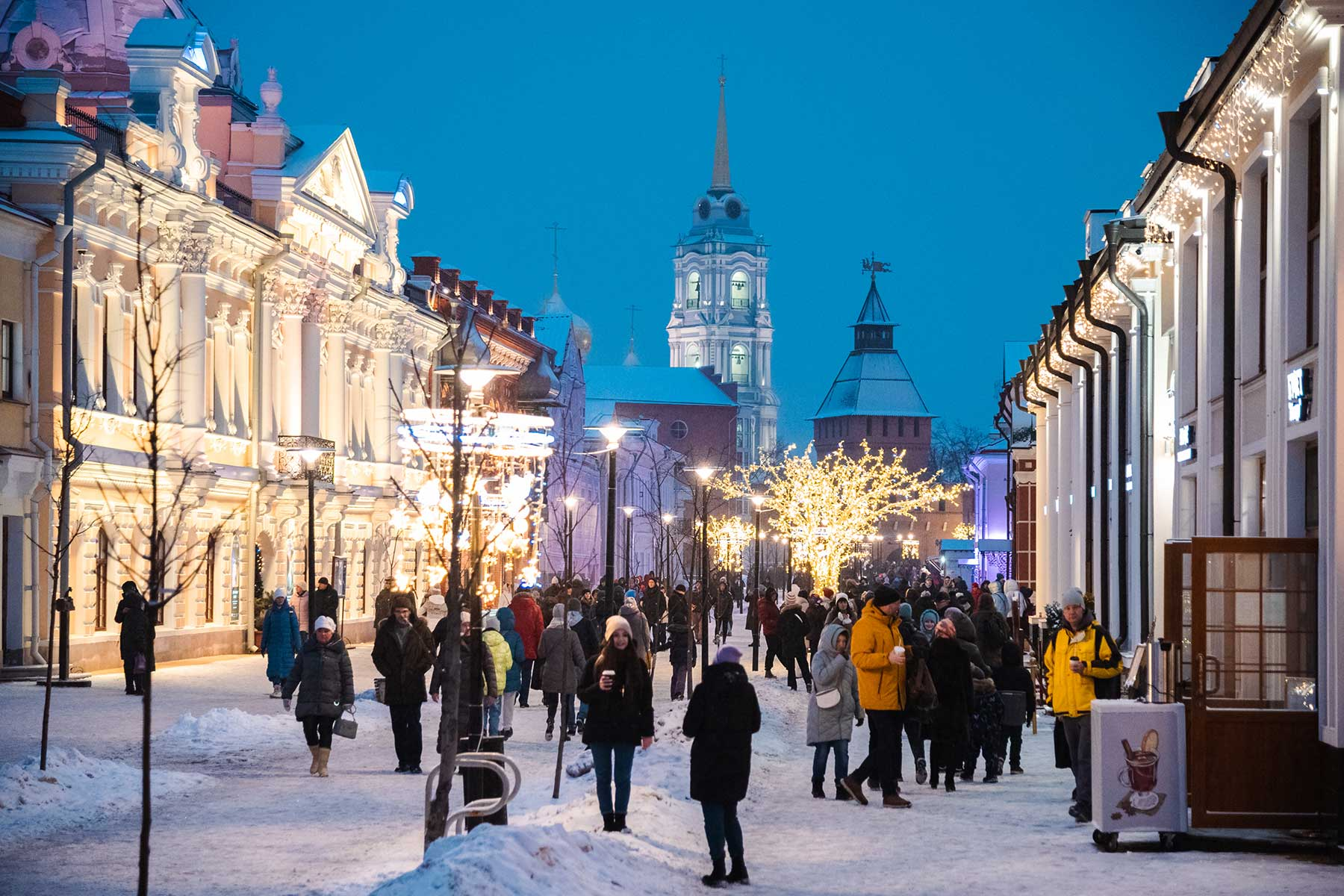
Metallistov Street

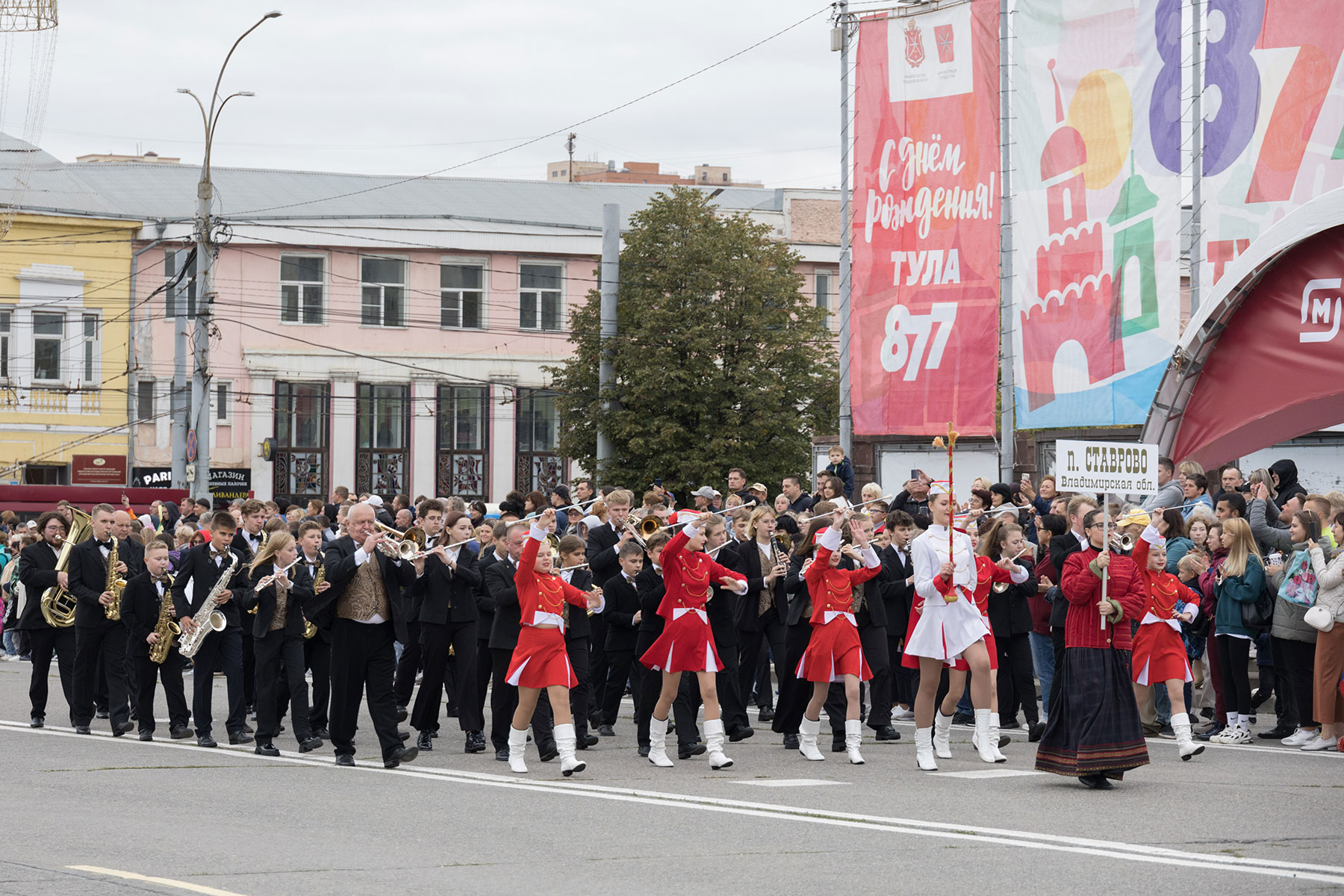
City Day in Tula in 2023

A musical instrument, the Tula accordion, is named after the city, which is a center of manufacture for such instruments sold throughout Russia and the world. Tula is also renowned for traditional Russian pryanik, cookies made with honey and spices (see Tula pryanik). In the West, Tula is perhaps best known as the center of arms manufacturing, mainly by TT pistol, as well as samovar production: the Russian equivalent of "coals to Newcastle" is "You don't take a samovar to Tula". (The saying is falsely ascribed to the writer and playwright Anton Chekhov, whose made a satirical portrait of one of his characters saying "Taking your wife to Paris is the same as taking your own samovar to Tula".)

The most popular tourist attraction in Tula Oblast is Yasnaya Polyana, the home and burial place of the writer Leo Tolstoy. It is situated 14 kilometres (8 1/2 miles) southwest of the city. It was here that Tolstoy wrote his celebrated novels War and Peace and Anna Karenina. The largest public park in Tula is the P. Belousov Central Park of Culture and Recreation.

== Education ==
Tula is home to:

- Tula State University
- Tula State Pedagogical University
- The Tula artillery and Engineering Institute
- A branch of All Russia Economic and Finance Institute
- A branch of Moscow Economics and Management Institute

== Transportation ==
Since 1867, there has been a railway connection between Tula and Moscow. Tula is a major railway junction with trains to Moscow, Oryol, Kursk and Kaluga. The Moscow to Simferopol M2 motorway runs past the city. City transport is provided by trams, trolleybuses, buses, and marshrutkas. Tula trams, trolleybuses, and bus routes are operated by "Tulgorelectrotrans" (Tula city electrotransport company). The Russian Air Force base Klokovo is located nearby.

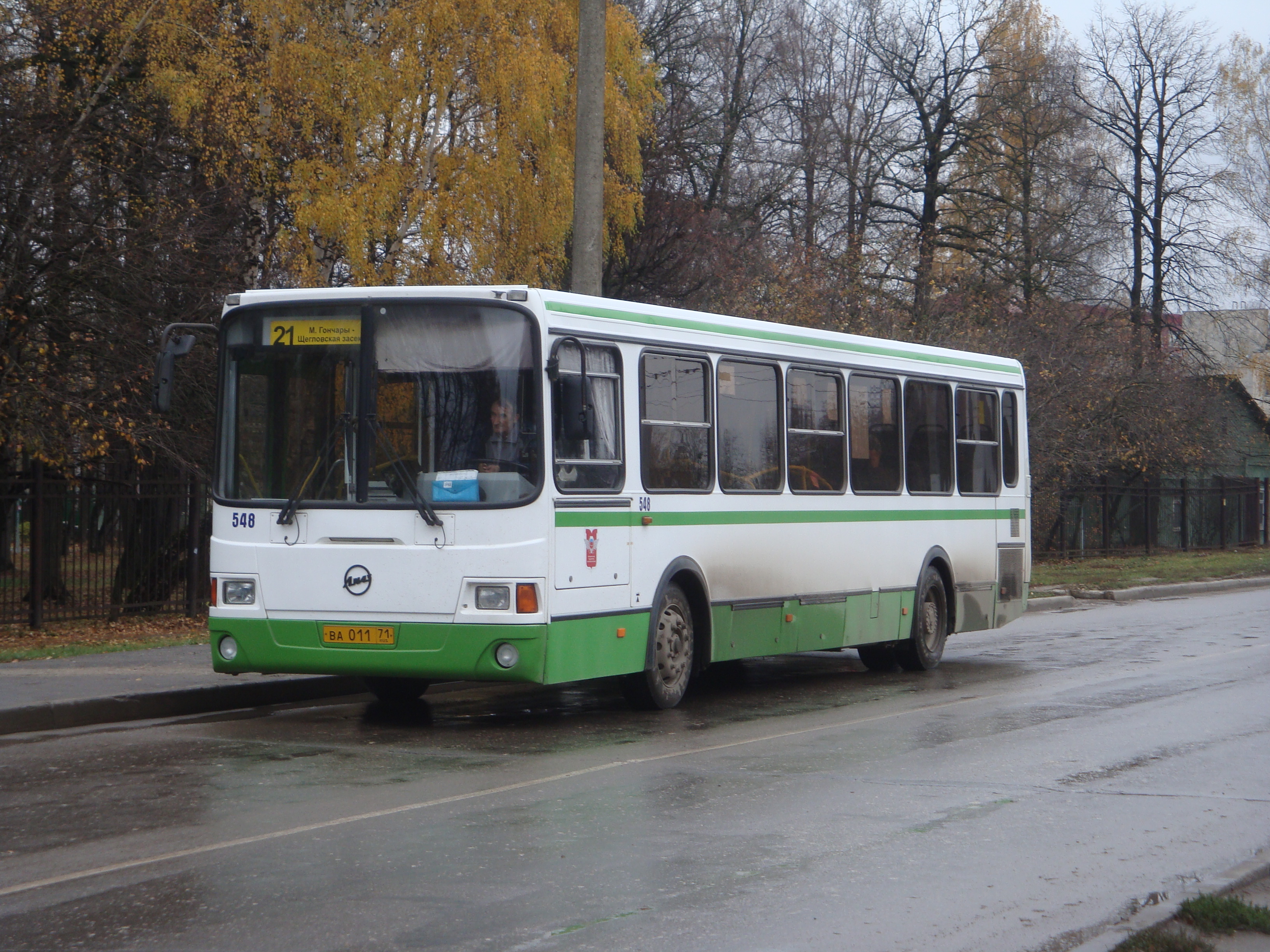
Bus LiAZ-5256

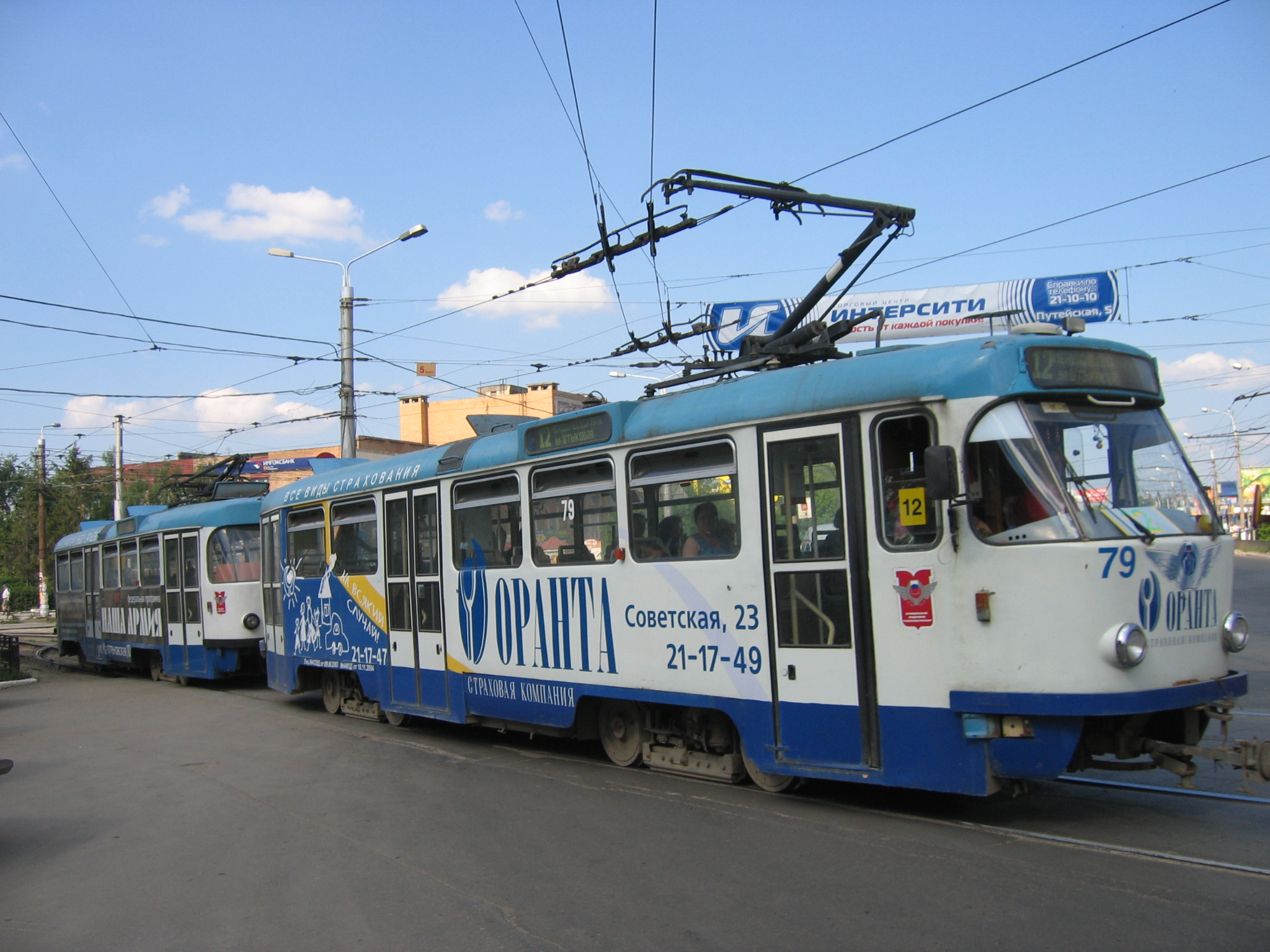
Tram Tatra T3

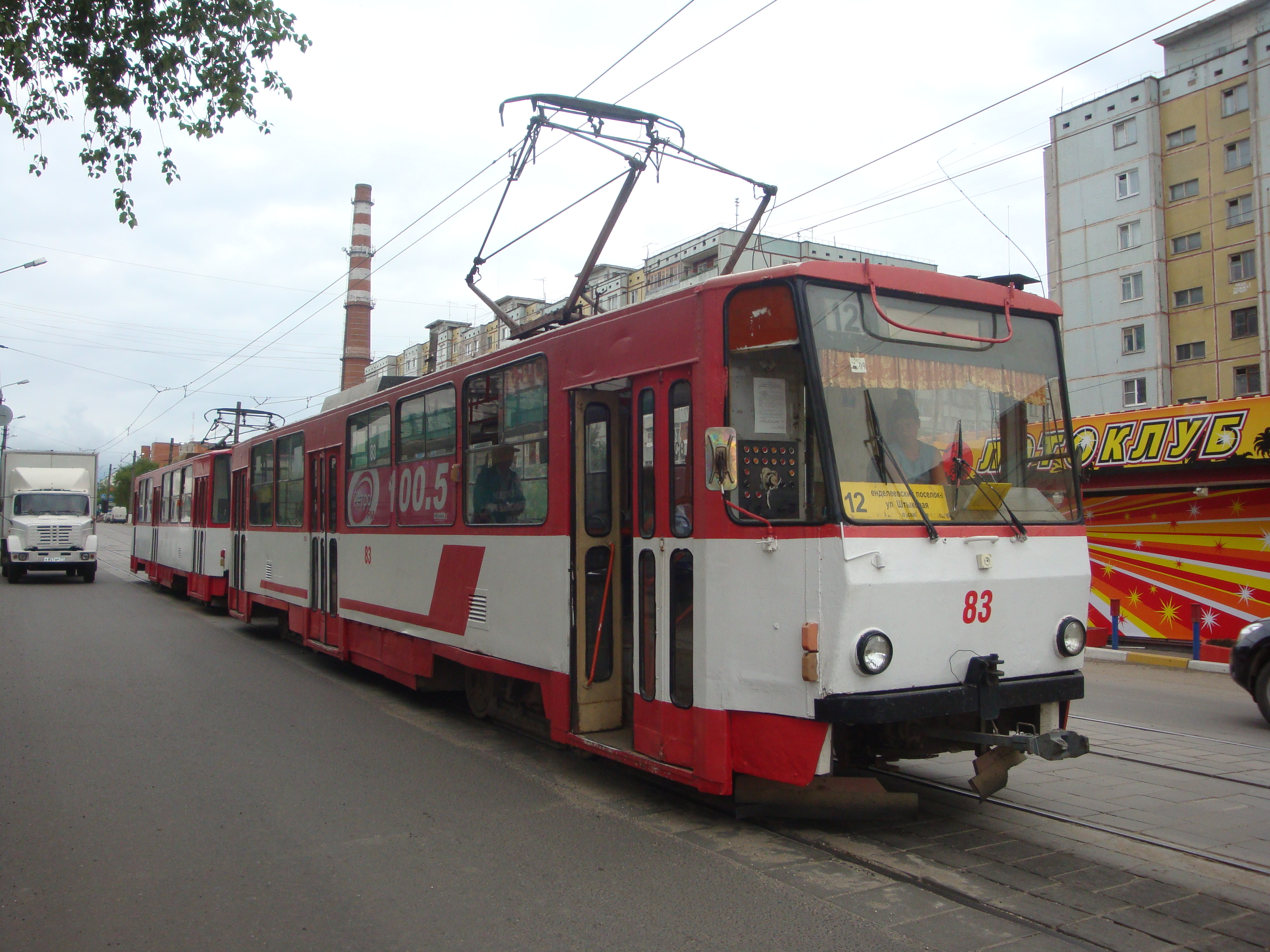
Tatra T6B5

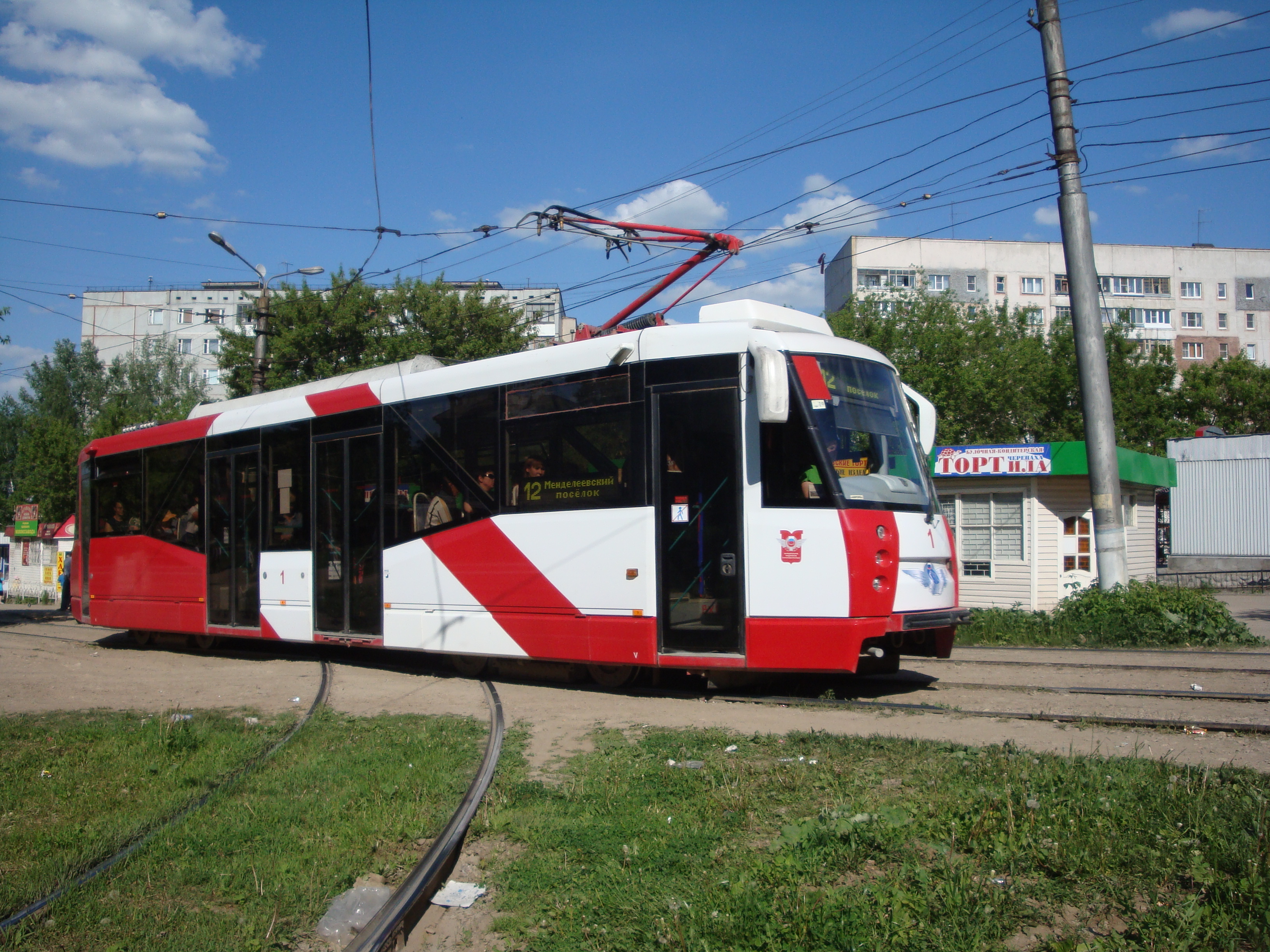
LM-2008

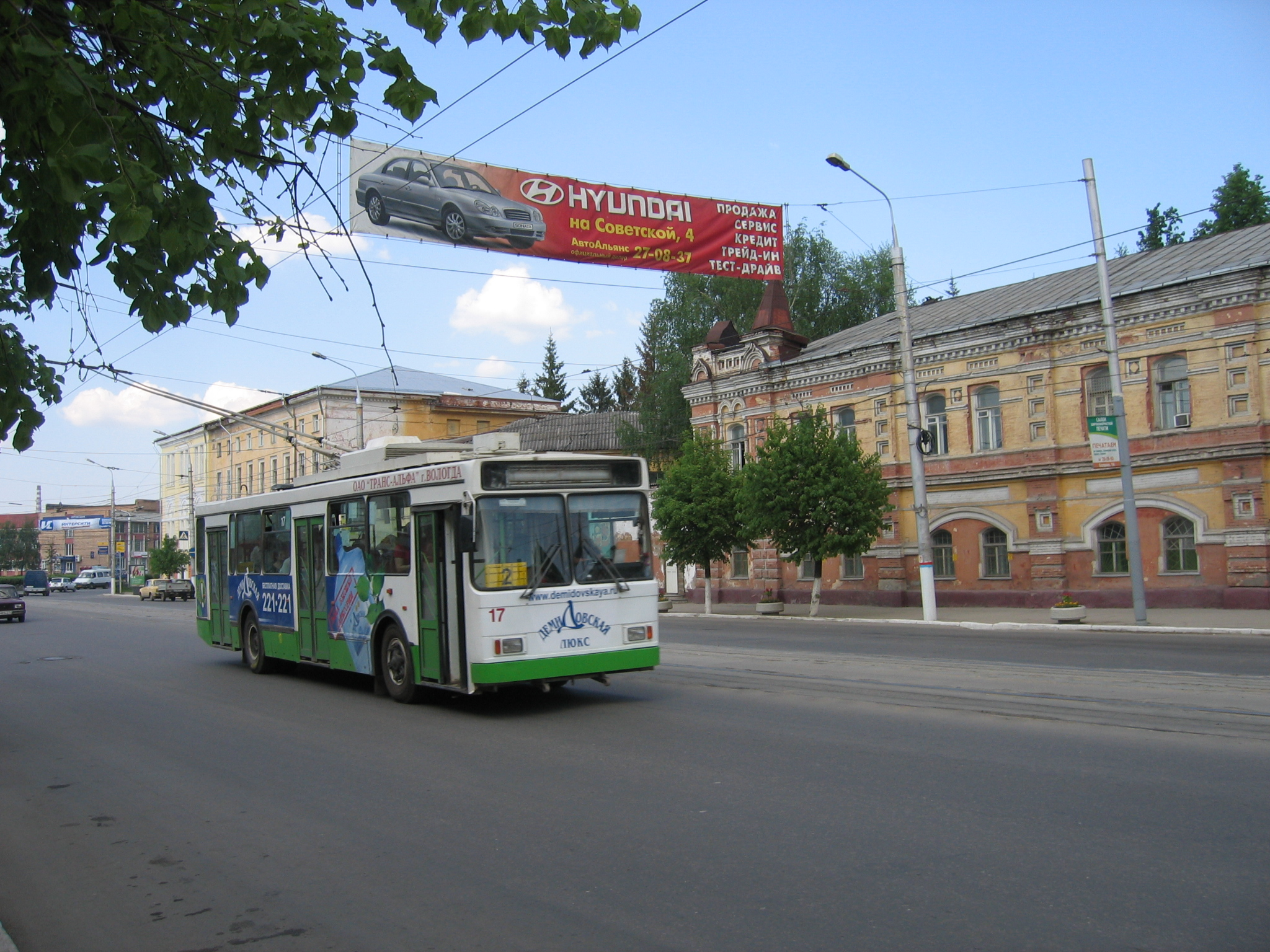
Trolleybus VMZ-5298

== Religion ==
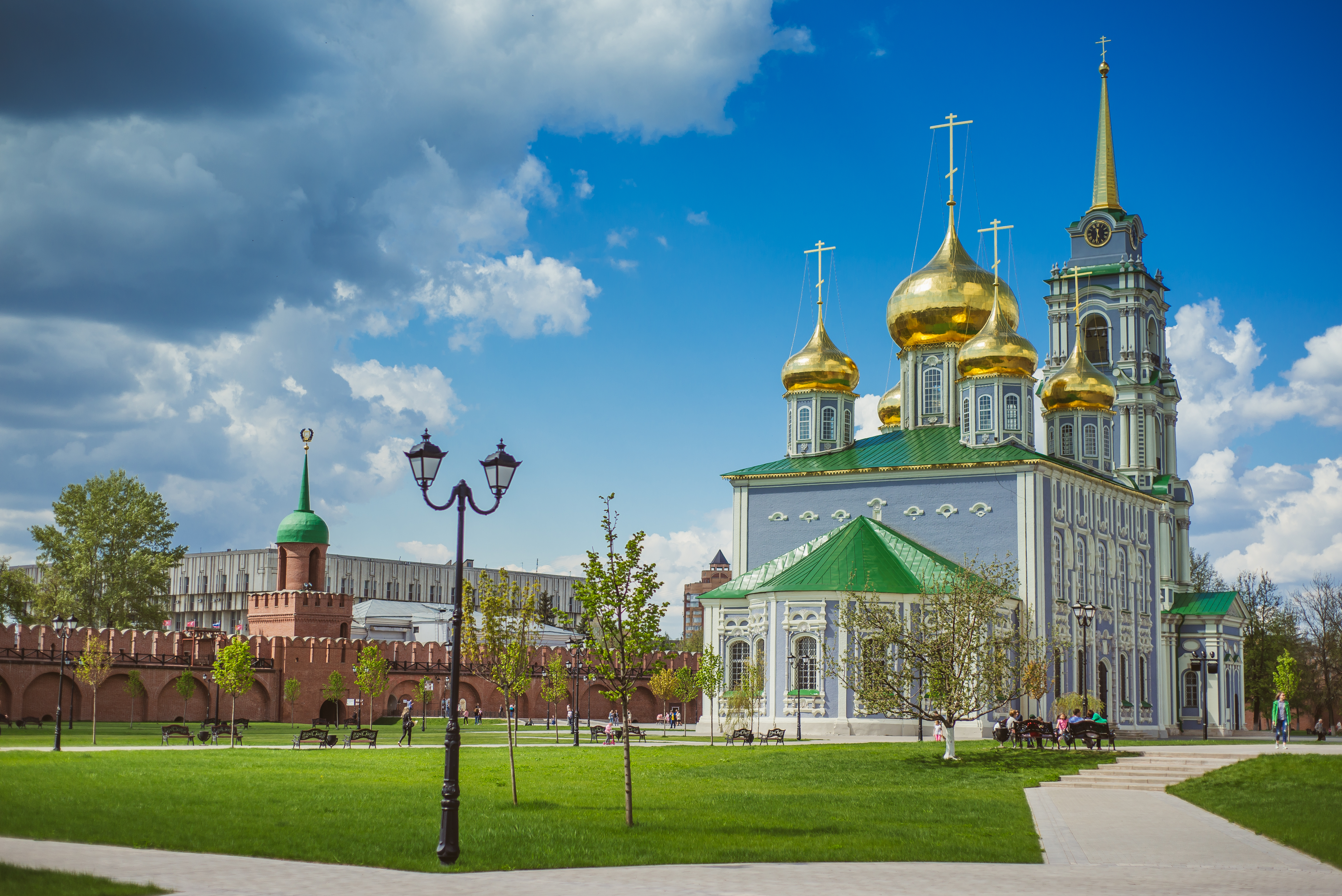
Cathedral of the Dormition of the Theotokos in Tula

Most of Tula's churches are Russian Orthodox churches. Next in number are Catholics and Protestants. Other religions present in the city include Muslims, Jews, Hare Krishna, Buddhists and Taoists.

All Orthodox organizations in Tula and the Tula Oblast are under the Diocese of Tula and Yefremov. The oldest churches in Tula include the Saints' Cathedral (built from 1776-1800), the Annunciation Church (1692), and the Assumption Cathedral of the Tula Kremlin (1762-1764). The Shcheglovsky Monastery of Holy Mother of God is also located within the city, built in the mid-19th century and consecrated in 1860. Old Believers' community services are performed in the church of St. John Chrysostom.

The only Roman Catholic church in Tula is the Holy Apostles Peter and Paul. Since the 1990s, several Protestant denominations have grown, the largest of which is a Baptist church with a prayer house in Tula. Representatives of other Protestant churches in Tula are Seventh-day Adventists, Presbyterians (Church of the Holy Trinity, The Glorious Jesus the Lord, the Good News), Pentecostals (Tula Christian Center, Church of the New Testament) and other evangelical churches (Word of Life, the Vine Gypsy Church).

The city also has a synagogue and the Jewish Community House.

== Sports ==
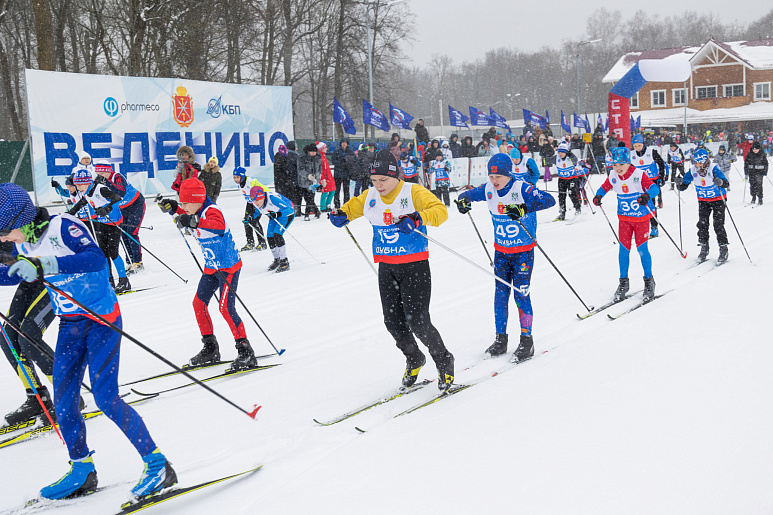
Vedenin Ski track in Tula

In Russian fist fighting, Tula was considered to have some of the most famous fighters.

The city association football club, FC Arsenal Tula, played in the Russian Premier League in 2014/2015 and 2016/2017 seasons, and now competes in the second-tier Russian First Division.

The city's professional ice hockey club, HC AKM, competes in the All-Russian Hockey League, the second tier of Russian hockey.

== People ==
=== Arts ===
- Leo Tolstoy (1828–1910), Writer
- Leonid Bobylev (1949–2025), composer
- German Galynin (1922–1966), composer
- Vladimir Mashkov (born 1963), theater and film actor and director
- Vyacheslav Nevinny (1934–2009), theater and film actor
- Maria Ouspenskaya (1876–1949), actress and acting teacher
- Vsevolod Sanayev (1912–1996), theater and film actor, acting teacher
- Sofia Sotnichevskaya (1916–2011), actress
- Irina Skobtseva (1927–2020), actress
- Gleb Uspensky (1843–1901), writer
- Vikenty Veresaev (1867–1945), writer
- Alexey Vorobyov (born 1988), singer, actor and model
- Alexey Goloborodko (born 1994), dance contortionist

=== Public servants ===
- Vyacheslav Dudka (born 1960), governor of Tula Oblast (2005–2011)
- Vladimir Ivanov (1893–1938), Soviet politician
- Yury Afonin (born 1977), politician
- Viktor Ilyich Baranov (1906–1996), Soviet Army lieutenant general
- Ivan Bakhtin (1756–1818), governor of the Kharkov Governorate

=== Sciences, technologies ===
- Nikolay Artemov (1908–2005) physiologist
- Vladimir Bazarov (1874–1939), philosopher and economist
- Vasily Degtyaryov (1880–1949), weapons engineer
- Valery Legasov (1936–1988), inorganic chemist
- Karl Maximovich (1827–1891), botanist
- Valeri Polyakov (1942–2022), cosmonaut
- Ivan Sakharov (1807–1863), folklorist, ethnographer
- Petr Sushkin (1868–1928), ornithologist
- Leonid Petrovich Tatarinov (1926–2011), paleontologist and evolutionary biologist.
- Sergei Tokarev (1899–1985), historian, ethnographer

=== Sports ===
- Ksenia Afanasyeva (born 1991), Olympic artistic gymnast, world and European champion
- Evgeniya Augustinas (born 1988), racing cyclist, European champion
- Ekaterina Gnidenko (born 1992), track cyclist
- Yevgeny Grishin (1931–2005), speedskater, Olympic and European champion
- Oksana Grishina (born 1968), track cyclist
- Irina Kirillova (born 1965), volleyball player, Olympic, world and European champion
- Sergei Kopylov (born 1960), racing cyclist
- Alexander Kotov (1913–1981), chess player, international grandmaster, USSR champion, author, mechanical engineer
- Viktor Kudriavtsev (born 1937), figure skating coach
- Andrey Kuznetsov (born 1991), tennis player
- Vladimir Leonov (born 1937), cyclist
- Valentina Maksimova (born 1937), track cyclist
- Ihor Nadein (1948–2014), football player and coach
- Nikolay Novikov, (born 15 May 1946), boxer
- Alexandra Obolentseva (born 2001), chess player
- Yelena Posevina (born 1986), rhythmic gymnast, Olympic, world and European champion
- Anastasia Voynova (born 1993), racing cyclist, world and European champion

=== Others ===
- Nikita Demidov (1656–1725), industrialist, founder of Demidov dynasty

== Population ==
Population size
| 1811 | 1840 | 1856 | 1863 | 1897 | 1913 | 1914 | 1923 | 1926 | 1931 | 1933 | 1937 |
| 52 100 | ▼51 700 | ▼50 600 | ▲56 700 | ▲115 000 | ▲138 900 | ▲139 700 | ▼123 300 | ▲150 331 | ▲191 200 | ▲199 500 | ▲239 122 |
| 1939 | 1956 | 1959 | 1962 | 1967 | 1970 | 1973 | 1975 | 1979 | 1982 | 1985 | 1986 |
| ▲272 224 | ▲320 000 | ▼315 639 | ▲342 000 | ▲377 000 | ▲461 965 | ▲486 000 | ▲502 000 | ▲514 008 | ▲524 000 | ▲529 000 | ▲532 000 |
| 1987 | 1989 | 1990 | 1991 | 1992 | 1993 | 1994 | 1995 | 1996 | 1997 | 1998 | 1999 |
| ▲538 000 | ▲539 980 | ▲540 000 | ▲544 000 | ▼541 000 | ▼539 000 | ▼535 000 | ▼529 000 | ▼525 000 | 525 000 | ▼516 000 | ▼513 100 |
| 2000 | 2001 | 2002 | 2003 | 2004 | 2005 | 2006 | 2007 | 2008 | 2009 | 2010 | 2011 |
| ▼506 100 | ▼495 500 | ▼481 216 | ▼481 200 | ▼472 300 | ▼465 900 | ▲509 000 | ▼504 000 | ▼500 000 | ▼496 035 | ▲501 169 | ▼500 314 |
| 2012 | 2013 | 2014 | 2015 | 2016 | 2017 | 2018 | 2019 | 2020 | 2021 | 2023 | 2024 |
| ▼499 511 | ▼493 813 | ▼490 508 | ▼487 841 | ▼485 930 | ▼485 221 | ▼482 873 | ▼479 105 | ▼475 161 | ▼473 622 | ▼466 609 | ▼461 692 |

== Climate ==
Tula has a humid continental climate, featuring warm summers, and cold, but not particularly severe winters by Russian standards.

Climate data for Tula (1991–2020, extremes 1897–present)
| Month | Jan | Feb | Mar | Apr | May | Jun | Jul | Aug | Sep | Oct | Nov | Dec | Year |
|---|---|---|---|---|---|---|---|---|---|---|---|---|---|
| Record high °C (°F) | 7.0 (44.6) | 7.3 (45.1) | 19.0 (66.2) | 29.0 (84.2) | 33.2 (91.8) | 35.0 (95.0) | 39.0 (102.2) | 39.2 (102.6) | 30.2 (86.4) | 24.3 (75.7) | 17.8 (64.0) | 9.3 (48.7) | 39.2 (102.6) |
| Mean daily maximum °C (°F) | −4.2 (24.4) | −3.4 (25.9) | 2.5 (36.5) | 11.9 (53.4) | 19.6 (67.3) | 22.8 (73.0) | 25.1 (77.2) | 23.6 (74.5) | 17.3 (63.1) | 9.6 (49.3) | 1.6 (34.9) | −2.7 (27.1) | 10.3 (50.5) |
| Daily mean °C (°F) | −6.9 (19.6) | −6.7 (19.9) | −1.5 (29.3) | 6.8 (44.2) | 13.8 (56.8) | 17.2 (63.0) | 19.5 (67.1) | 17.7 (63.9) | 12.0 (53.6) | 5.8 (42.4) | −0.8 (30.6) | −5.0 (23.0) | 6.0 (42.8) |
| Mean daily minimum °C (°F) | −9.7 (14.5) | −10.1 (13.8) | −5.3 (22.5) | 1.8 (35.2) | 7.9 (46.2) | 11.6 (52.9) | 14.0 (57.2) | 12.2 (54.0) | 7.4 (45.3) | 2.5 (36.5) | −3.1 (26.4) | −7.5 (18.5) | 1.8 (35.2) |
| Record low °C (°F) | −42.0 (−43.6) | −38.0 (−36.4) | −32.2 (−26.0) | −19.0 (−2.2) | −4.3 (24.3) | 1.9 (35.4) | 4.0 (39.2) | −1.1 (30.0) | −6.8 (19.8) | −13.0 (8.6) | −26.3 (−15.3) | −37.0 (−34.6) | −42.0 (−43.6) |
| Average precipitation mm (inches) | 43 (1.7) | 38 (1.5) | 35 (1.4) | 40 (1.6) | 48 (1.9) | 76 (3.0) | 77 (3.0) | 60 (2.4) | 57 (2.2) | 55 (2.2) | 41 (1.6) | 45 (1.8) | 615 (24.2) |
| Average extreme snow depth cm (inches) | 18 (7.1) | 29 (11) | 23 (9.1) | 2 (0.8) | 0 (0) | 0 (0) | 0 (0) | 0 (0) | 0 (0) | 0 (0) | 3 (1.2) | 10 (3.9) | 29 (11) |
| Average rainy days | 5 | 5 | 6 | 12 | 13 | 16 | 15 | 13 | 13 | 15 | 12 | 6 | 131 |
| Average snowy days | 21 | 22 | 15 | 4 | 0.2 | 0 | 0 | 0 | 0.3 | 4 | 13 | 21 | 101 |
| Average relative humidity (%) | 85 | 82 | 76 | 67 | 64 | 70 | 72 | 74 | 78 | 82 | 86 | 86 | 77 |
| Mean monthly sunshine hours | 37.2 | 72.8 | 142.6 | 207.0 | 285.2 | 279.0 | 294.5 | 279.0 | 180.0 | 93.0 | 36.0 | 31.0 | 1,937.3 |
Source 1: Pogoda.ru.net
Source 2: Climatebase (sun, 1959–2011)

== Twin towns – sister cities ==
Tula is twinned with:

- Albany, United States
- Barranquilla, Colombia
- Kerch, Russia
- Mogilev, Belarus
- Villingen-Schwenningen, Germany
