= Franciszek Białous =

Polish microbiologist (1901–1980)

Franciszek Białous (August 7, 1901 – January 14, 1980) was a Polish microbiologist. Between 1955 and 1971, he was the Chair of Microbiology at the Higher School of Agriculture, now Szczecin Academy of Agriculture.

== Decorations ==
- Knight's Cross of the Order of Polonia Restituta
- Golden Cross of Merit
- Medal of the 10th Anniversary of People's Poland
