= Yaroslav Belousov =

Russian student and political prisoner

Yaroslav Gennadievich Belousov (born July 30, 1991) is a Russian political-science student who was a participant in the May 6, 2012, Bolotnaya Square protest against President Vladimir Putin and who has been imprisoned since June 9, 2012, as a result of his participation in the protest.

Russia's Memorial Human Rights Center considers Belousov a political prisoner; Amnesty International has declared him a prisoner of conscience and has described his trial in 2013-14 as a farce. Human Rights Watch calls his conviction a “miscarriage of justice.” His continued imprisonment has been condemned by both the U.S. State Department and by the Tom Lantos Human Rights Commission of the U.S. House of Representatives.

== Early life and education ==
Belousov was born on July 30, 1991. As of May 2012, he was a fourth-year student in the Faculty of Political Science at Moscow State University and a member of the Russian Citizens Union, a national democratic movement. A December 2012 profile of Belousov described him as having lived “a life full of promise” until his arrest.

== Bolotnaya Square protest ==
A mass protest against Vladimir Putin took place on May 6, 2012, in Bolotnaya Square in Moscow. The participants in the demonstration were described in the New York Times as a representation of middle-class Russians opposed to Putin's presidency.

Both of them attended the protest on Bolotnaya Square. Belousov's wife, Tamara Belousova, later said that her husband had attended the protest in part because of his research into political organization methods. Belousov himself later stated he attended Bolotnaya Square for to collect data for his university thesis. According to his wife, Belousov had gradually become more active in promoting civic discussion.

According to authorities, 29 police officers and 55 protesters reported injuries, mostly minor, sustained in the violence that erupted during the Bolotnaya Square protest. Russian investigators claimed that the violence had been part of an orchestrated plan to destabilize the government. Belousov was among those arrested during the protests, and released the same day. He denied having taken part in clashes during the demonstration.

=== Second arrest and charges ===
On June 9, 2012, Belousov was taken into custody again, this time by authorities appearing at his apartment where he lived with his wife, child, and mother-in-law. Belousov was charged under paragraph 2 of Article 212 (“Participation in Mass Riots”) and paragraph 1 of Article 318 (“Use of Violence Not Endangering Life or Health against a Representative of the Authorities) of the Russian Federation’s Criminal Code.

=== Incarceration ===
Belousov was imprisoned pending trial by the Moscow Zamoskvoretsky Court. Between his arrest and December 2012, he was allowed to see his wife only twice, in the visitors’ room of the detention center. One observer of his pre-trial incarceration criticized the lengths the government took to imprison Belousov when he had a proven record of compliance. Gazeta reported on July 4, 2012, that the Basmanny court had extended the incarceration of Belousov and three other protesters, Maxim Lusyanin, Andrei Barabanov, and Fedor Backhov.

=== Support for Belousov ===
In June 2012, Russia's human-rights ombudsman stated the mass-rioting charges brought against Belousov and others were disproportionate. In December 2013, “an international panel of experts on freedom of assembly published a report that found that although there were individual violent episodes” that had taken place in Bolotnaya Square, they did not constitute a 'mass riot'. This panel, too, described the criminal charges brought against Belousov and others as unwarranted and concluded that the May 6 violence was a result of the government's response.

The conclusion of Human Rights Watch (HRW) was virtually the same, with HRW official Tanya Lokshina saying: “The facts on the ground simply did not justify mass rioting charges against the protesters, let alone conviction.” During Belousov's imprisonment, HRW called on Russia to release the demonstrators from custody and stated that authorities’ actions violated the European Convention of Human Rights, of which Russia is a signatory.

Amnesty International designated Belousov a prisoner of conscience. IFEX stated that there was “no video evidence” linking Belousov to any act of violence. The Committee of Concerned Scientists wrote a letter to Vladimir Putin in support of Belousov, and Russia's Memorial Human Rights Center recognized Belousov as a political prisoner.

== Trial ==
The trial against Belousov and his fellow defendants began on June 6, 2013. The ages of Belousov and his fellow defendants in the case, all males, ranged from 19 to 51, according to the New York Times, though most were in their 20s. They were of a myriad of backgrounds, some being students, and journalists.

According to officials, Belousov had thrown “rocks and pieces of asphalt” and had broken through a cordon and attacked police officers. Video evidence, supported by the testimony of witnesses, indicated that Belousov had only thrown a piece of fruit. In one four-second video, according to Forbes Magazine, he was seen “bending down to pick up an object, which he then aimlessly tossed…in the direction of riot police. There are no videos or still images of the object striking anyone….Videos taken from another angle (and posted on the web) clearly show Belousov tossing the remains of the crushed tangerine or lemon he had bent down to retrieve.” While the defense said that the item in question was a lemon, and that the policeman who claimed to have been harmed by the projectile had departed from the scene before it was thrown, prosecutors argued that the object in question had been a billiard ball.

Belousov was represented by attorney Dmitry V. Agranovsky, who also represented another defendant in the same trial, Vladimir Akimenkov. On June 9, 2013, the New York Times cited Agranovsky's view that “the lengthy pretrial detention of most of the defendants was proof of the political nature of the charges,” and quoted him as stating that it was unusual the government detained the suspects were held for a year without bail, despite no previous arrest record for any of them.

Agranovsky further told the Times that the charges against Belousov were based entirely on one officer's testimony who claimed to be struck in the chest by a "yellow object". Agranovsky expressed doubt that the officer had been seriously hurt, noting “[a] riot police officer’s chest is protected by a serious guard, some sort of Kevlar vest, which can withstand at the very least knives, and maybe things stronger.” Agranovsky also expressed pessimism about the trial's likely outcome, stating the best likely outcome was a reduced sentence.

The Times also reported in its June 9 article that the case against Belousov and the other Bolotnaya Square protesters, as well as other cases against opposition leaders, had managed to suppress the anti-Putin protest movement through fear. Critics claimed that the government's clamp down on ordinary protestors, rather than opposition leaders, indicated their intent to intimidate. The case against Belousov and other protesters was set apart from other trials against opposition members, according to the Times, by the fact “that not one of the defendants was a high-profile opposition leader when arrested.”

In January 2014, Moscow's Zamoskvoretsky court rejected amnesty for both Belousov and Alexandra Dukhanina, another defendant in the Bolotnaya Square case. The prosecutor in the trial demanded a 5-year prison sentence for Belousov. In his closing statement, Belousov state: “I do not plead guilty because I was not involved in any wrongdoing.”

=== Verdict and sentencing ===
On February 21, 2014, Belousov and seven other defendants were found guilty of “application of force against representatives of authority.” The sentencing was characterized by a writer for Forbes as having been “conveniently delayed…until after the…closing ceremony” of the Sochi Olympics. On the day the verdict was handed down, Amnesty International issued a statement describing the trial of Belousov and his seven co-defendants as “clearly a show trial.” John Dalhuisen of Amnesty International said, “What happened on Bolotnaya Square on May 6, 2012 was not the quelling of a riot, but the crushing of a protest. The Bolotnaya trial has not exposed orchestrated violence, but rather a criminal justice system that is entirely malleable to the dictates of its political masters." Amnesty International called for the immediate release of the Bolotnaya protestors whom it described as prisoners of conscience. Human Rights Watch described the guilty verdicts against Belousov and the other seven defendants as “a miscarriage of justice.”

On February 24, 2014, Belousov was sentenced to 2 years and 6 months in prison. The judge stated he had received a reduced sentence due to his having never committed a crime previously. The judge maintained, however, that defense witnesses’ testimony had “not refuted the overflowing of the events into mass riots and have not refuted the proof of participation of the defendants in the riots.”

Outside the court, protesters held a banner reading: “You Can’t Jail Everybody.” As the judge read the sentences for Belousov and his fellow defendants, according to one source, "chants of ‘Shame!’" entered the court. Agranovsky told a reporter that the harsh punishment meted out to his client was, in his view, “in part a Kremlin reaction to the upheaval in neighbouring Ukraine.” At the sentencing, about 200 persons, among them two previously incarcerated members of the punk band Pussy Riot, were briefly detained by police outside the court.

In a February 25, 2014, statement, the U.S. Department of State condemned the sentencing of Belousov and the other protestors. The State Department claimed that they had been unlawfully detained for over a year on politically-motivated charges, calling it "another example of punishment of Russians for exercising their constitutionally guaranteed freedoms of speech and assembly."

On February 27, 2014, the co-chairman of the Tom Lantos Human Rights Commission of the House of Representatives of the United States, Jim McGovern (D-MA) and Frank Wolf (R-VA), expressed “grave concern over the mass detentions of peaceful protesters” who had taken to the streets “to protest the sentences handed down in the cases of eight participants of the Bolotnaya Square demonstrations,” including Belousov. The Lantos Commission described the trials as having been “marked by a lack of due process” and as “widely recognized as politically-motivated,” and urged the Russian government “to address these recent instances of blatant injustice.”

== Personal life ==
Belousov and his wife, Tamara Belousova, were married in 2010. She was 21 years old in June 2013, and at that time was also a political science student. She and her husband are the parents of a son, Andrei, who was 4 years old as of June 2015. According to his wife, Belousov is “a scholarly man interested in political science” Describing him as “a man of books,” she told the New York Times in June 2013 that “this saves him now that he is in jail….I asked him how he celebrated the New Year; he answered that he finished reading five volumes of the history of the Middle Ages.”
