= S. R. Belousov =

Russian specialist in Chinese ideology and culture

- Сергей Романович Белоусов
- Born: Sergei Romanovich Belousov; 21 April 1957 (age 69); Moscow, Russian SFSR, Soviet Union
- Education: Moscow State University
- Occupations: Historian, Sinologist
- Known for: Studies on Chinese ideology and culture

Sergei Romanovich Belousov (Russian: Сергей Романович Белоусов; born 21 April 1957, Moscow) is a Russian specialist in Chinese ideology and culture.

== Biography ==
Belousov graduated in 1979 from the Institute of Asian and African Countries at Moscow State University. He completed his postgraduate studies in 1987 at the Institute of Far Eastern Studies of the Academy of Sciences of the USSR (now the Institute of Far Eastern Studies of the Russian Academy of Sciences). Since 1987, he has held the degree of Candidate of Historical Sciences. Since 1988, he has been a Senior Research Fellow at the Institute of Far Eastern Studies of the Russian Academy of Sciences.

== Academic work ==
Belousov's primary research focuses on the history of socio-political and philosophical thought in modern China. His Candidate dissertation was titled Кит. концепция "гос. социализма" (30 - 40-е годы XX в.). Критич. анализ ("The Chinese Conception of 'State Socialism' (1930–1940s): A Critical Analysis"), Moscow, 1987 (Nauka, 1989). He was a contributor to the Russian Encyclopedic Dictionary of Chinese Philosophy

== Bibliography ==
- Mihail Leont’evič Titarenko et al. (eds.): Китайская философия. Энциклопедический словарь (Chinese Philosophy. Encyclopedic Dictionary). Moscow, 1994, ISBN 5-244-00757-2
