= Sergei Belous =

Russian footballer

Personal information
- Full name: Sergei Timofeyevich Belous
- Date of birth: 25 September 1970 (age 56)
- Height: 1.80 m (5 ft 11 in)
- Positions: Defender; midfielder

Youth career
- DYuSSh-5 GorONO Krasnodar

Senior career*
| Years | Team | Apps | (Gls) |
| 1988 | FC Spartak Anapa | 14 | (0) |
| 1988 | FC Kuban Krasnodar | 4 | (0) |
| 1989 | FC Chayka-CSKA-2 Moscow | 38 | (2) |
| 1990 | PFC CSKA Moscow | 0 | (0) |
| 1990–1992 | FC Kuban Krasnodar | 63 | (2) |
| 1992 | FC Niva Slavyansk-na-Kubani | 1 | (1) |
| 1993–1996 | FC Kuban Krasnodar | 102 | (9) |
| 1996 | → FC Kuban-d Krasnodar (loan) | 2 | (0) |
| 1996 | FC Druzhba Maykop | 15 | (0) |
| 1997 | FC Laba Ust-Labinsk | | |
| 1998 | FC Torpedo-Viktoriya Nizhny Novgorod | 33 | (0) |
| 1999 | FC Neftyanik Kubani Goryachiy Klyuch | | |
| 2000 | FC Khimik Belorechensk (amateur) | | |
- * Club domestic league appearances and goals

Sergei Timofeyevich Belous (Russian: Сергей Тимофеевич Белоус; born 25 September 1970) is a former Russian football player.

He played for the main squad of PFC CSKA Moscow in the USSR Federation Cup.
