= P. Belousov Central Park of Culture and Recreation =

Coordinates: 54°10′53″N 37°35′11″E

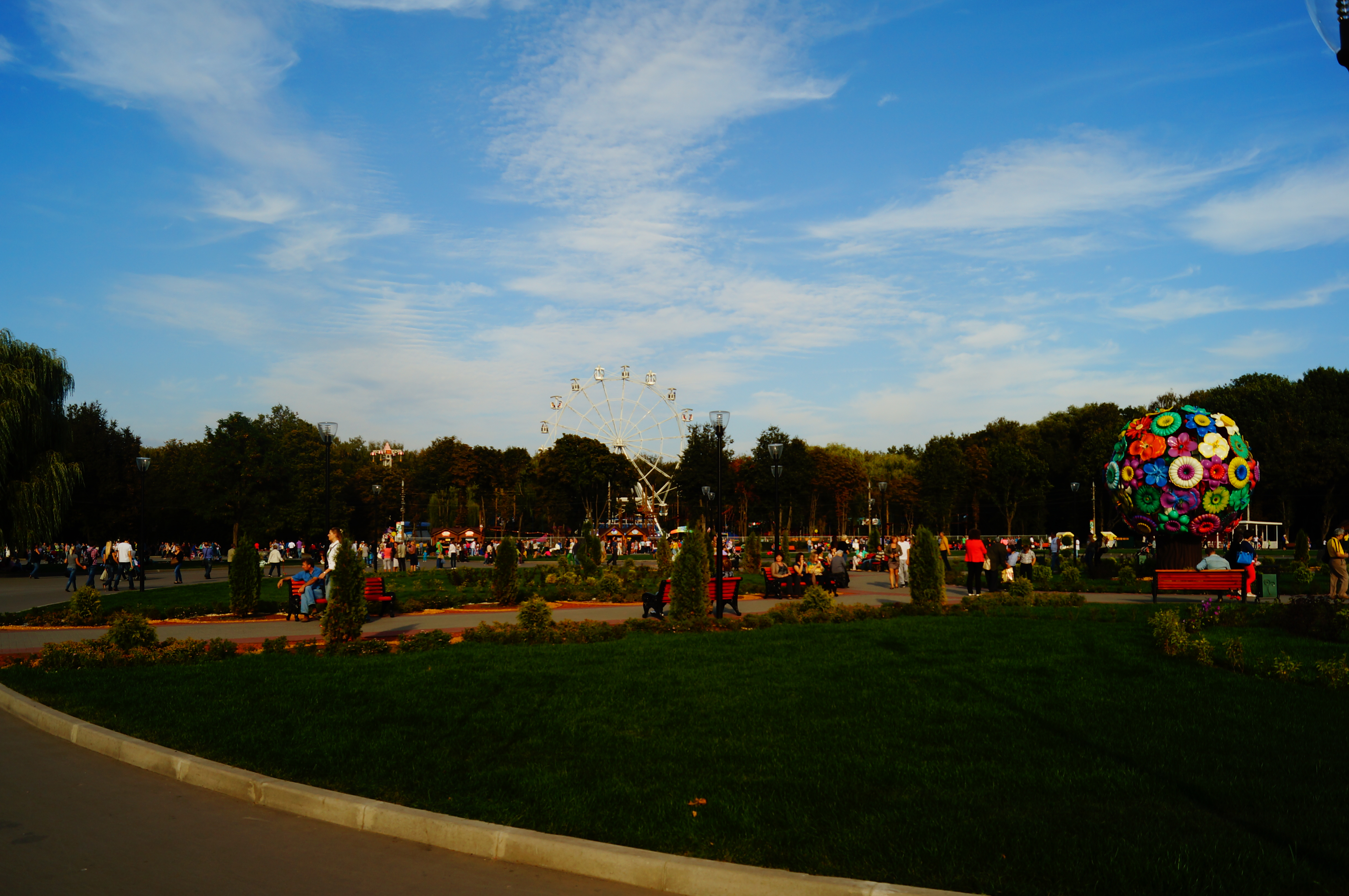
Belousov Park 2

P. Belousov Central Park of Culture and Recreation (rus Центра́льный парк культу́ры и о́тдыха им. П. П. Белоу́сова) is the largest Park of Tula city, a natural monument of the regional value and the object of the national property. Currently, the park is spread across an area of 143 hectares with 97 hectares covered by a forest. Besides the forest, there is a recreational area of around 35 hectares and a cascade of three ponds covering around 11 hectares.

== History ==
The park was developed on the site of the former city dump. The park was developed over the dump as the city was expanding and the presence of the nearby waste could affect the sanitary condition of the city. The park was established in 1893, when Pyotr Petrovich Belousov, who was the health officer of Tula, had the waste covered with soil and the area planted with trees. The Central Park was greatly expanded in the 1950s, when an additional 100 hectares was added. The landscape design of the park has changed over time.

== Present ==
The Central Park was opened on 36 ha of city-owned land and was expanded to its current size of 143 ha of them the forest occupies 97 ha, a cascade of three ponds covers 11 ha and the size of recreational area is about 35 ha. Among some 90 species of the trees and shrubs are growing within the Park there have been dominated by birch, ash tree, oak, pine, maple, basswood, though there are also some rare species such as phellodendron amurense, quercus rubra, pinus sibirica, salix alba, and others. The flora of the Park is characterized by big diversity the herbaceous plants that are represented by 200 species of grasses. Various birds and mammals live in the Central Park. There is a local zoo area that is inhabited many types of birds (including Cygnus cygnus, Cygnus atratus, peafowls, phasianus, parrots, and others). Also in the Park are roes, foxes, goats, and rabbits.
