= Ilya Belousov =

Russian footballer

Personal information
- Full name: Ilya Vladimirovich Belousov
- Date of birth: 29 November 1978 (age 47)
- Height: 1.78 m (5 ft 10 in)
- Position: Midfielder

Senior career*
Years	Team	Apps	(Gls)
1997	FC Neftekhimik Nizhnekamsk	2	(0)
2000–2001	FC Spartak Yoshkar-Ola	49	(1)
2004	FC Volga Ulyanovsk	30	(1)
2005	FC Lada-SOK Dimitrovgrad	35	(3)
2012–2015	FC Spartak Yoshkar-Ola	61	(4)
- * Club domestic league appearances and goals

Ilya Vladimirovich Belousov (Russian: Илья Владимирович Белоусов; born 29 November 1978) is a former Russian football midfielder.

== Club career ==
He played in the Russian Football National League for FC Neftekhimik Nizhnekamsk in 1997.
