= Dmitri Belousov =

Russian footballer

Personal information
- Full name: Dmitri Olegovich Belousov
- Date of birth: 21 April 1980 (age 46)
- Place of birth: Leningrad, Russian SFSR
- Height: 1.89 m (6 ft 2 in)
- Position: Goalkeeper

Youth career
- DYuSSh Smena-Zenit

Senior career*
Years	Team	Apps	(Gls)
1998–1999	FC Zenit-2 St. Petersburg	39	(0)
2000	FC Severstal Cherepovets	26	(0)
2001	FC Pskov-2000	33	(0)
2002–2003	FC Zenit-2 St. Petersburg	66	(0)
2004–2006	FC Lada Togliatti	71	(0)
2007	FC Amur Blagoveshchensk	29	(2)
2008	FC Metallurg-Kuzbass Novokuznetsk	6	(0)
2009	FC Rotor Volgograd	18	(0)
2009–2010	FC Metallurg-Kuzbass Novokuznetsk	39	(0)
2011	FC Sokol Saratov	3	(0)
2011–2012	FC Irtysh Omsk	9	(0)
2013	FC Piter Saint Petersburg	10	(0)
- * Club domestic league appearances and goals

Dmitri Olegovich Belousov (Russian: Дмитрий Олегович Белоусов; born 21 April 1980) is a former Russian professional football player.

== Club career ==
He played two seasons in the Russian Football National League for FC Lada Togliatti and FC Metallurg-Kuzbass Novokuznetsk.
